= List of rural localities in Vologda Oblast =

Map of Russia with Vologda Oblast highlighted

This is a list of rural localities in Vologda Oblast. Vologda Oblast (Russian: Вологодская область, romanized: Vologodskaya oblast, IPA: [vəlɐˈɡotskəjə ˈobləsʲtʲ]) is a federal subject of Russia (an oblast). Its administrative center is Vologda. Population: 1,202,444 (2010 Census).

== Babayevsky District ==
Rural localities in Babayevsky District:

Name	Name in Russian	Population (2002)	Coordinates
Afanasovo (Afanasovsky Selsoviet)	Афанасово	5	59°46′N 36°03′E
Afanasovo (Novostarinsky Selsoviet)	Афанасово	40	60°00′N 35°51′E
Afonino	Афонино	10	60°03′N 36°08′E
Aganino	Аганино	6	59°58′N 35°56′E
Aganino (Tsentralnoye Rural Settlement)	Аганино	13	60°04′N 35°32′E
Aksenovo	Аксёново	9	60°21′N 36°07′E
Aksentyevskaya	Аксентьевская	60	60°04′N 35°30′E
Alexandrovskaya (Borisovsky Selsoviet)	Александровская	34	59°55′N 36°00′E
Alexandrovskaya (Saninsky Selsoviet)	Александровская	91	59°35′N 36°17′E
Alexeyevskaya	Алексеевская	5	60°14′N 35°39′E
Amosovo	Амосово	7	59°35′N 36°00′E
Ananino	Ананино	48	59°59′N 36°07′E
Andronovo	Андроново	14	59°56′N 36°06′E
Antonovskaya	Антоновская	12	59°50′N 36°03′E
Apuchevo	Апучево	1	60°04′N 35°47′E
Artyomovo	Артёмово	32	60°06′N 36°18′E
Babayevo (rural locality)	Бабаево	38	59°24′N 35°54′E
Baluyevo	Балуево	14	59°46′N 35°56′E
Bardinskoye	Бардинское	7	59°32′N 35°42′E
Bereg	Берег	6	60°21′N 36°06′E
Bolshaya Pelpakhta	Большая Пельпахта	25	59°45′N 36°17′E
Bolshiye Kipretsy	Большие Кипрецы	2	59°41′N 35°54′E
Bolshoye Borilovo	Большое Борилово	24	59°45′N 35°58′E
Chashchino	Чащино	4	59°35′N 36°04′E
Chikovo	Чиково	17	59°12′N 36°10′E
Chistikovo	Чистиково	9	59°43′N 35°56′E
Chunikovo	Чуниково	36	60°00′N 36°08′E
Davydovka	Давыдовка	17	59°36′N 36°18′E
Davydovo	Давыдово	4	60°04′N 35°47′E
Dedovets	Дедовец	4	59°35′N 36°01′E
Demshino	Демшино	4	59°56′N 36°05′E
Diykovo	Дийково	83	59°58′N 36°06′E
Dubrovka	Дубровка	168	59°12′N 36°13′E
Dudino	Дудино	9	59°26′N 35°48′E
Dunovo	Дуново	1	60°05′N 36°18′E
Fedkovo	Федьково	2	60°03′N 35°40′E
Fenchikovo	Фенчиково	21	60°09′N 36°10′E
Fominskaya	Фоминская	6	60°06′N 36°19′E
Gashkovo	Гашково	4	60°05′N 35°29′E
Gorbachi	Горбачи	17	59°32′N 35°43′E
Gorbovo	Горбово	2	60°00′N 35°55′E
Gorka (Toropovskoye Rural Settlement)	Горка	5	59°31′N 35°40′E
Gorka (Vepsskoye natsionalnoye Rural Settlement)	Горка	114	60°05′N 36°19′E
Gorki	Горки	3	59°56′N 36°02′E
Gorochka	Горочка	8	59°29′N 35°42′E
Gridino (Borisovskoye Rural Settlement)	Гридино	6	60°02′N 35°35′E
Gridino (Vepsskoye natsionalnoye Rural Settlement)	Гридино	3	60°06′N 36°20′E
Grigoryevskaya	Григорьевская	10	60°14′N 35°40′E
Grinevo	Гринёво	48	60°02′N 35°36′E
Grinkovo	Гриньково	1	59°32′N 35°41′E
Ignatovo (Borisovskoye Rural Settlement)	Игнатово	11	59°53′N 36°06′E
Ignatovo (Pozharskoye Rural Settlement)	Игнатово	35	59°55′N 36°04′E
Ionino	Ионино	18	59°56′N 36°12′E
Istomino	Истомино	6	60°03′N 35°31′E
Ivanovskaya	Ивановская	6	59°57′N 35°59′E
Iyevkovo	Иевково	47	59°12′N 36°08′E
Kachalovo	Качалово	3	60°02′N 35°39′E
Kalachevo	Калачево	3	60°02′N 35°40′E
Karasovo	Карасово	79	39°53′N 36°01′E
Kerchakovo	Керчаково	1	60°03′N 35°31′E
Kernyashovo	Керняшово	45	60°00′N 35°52′E
Kharchevnya	Харчевня	81	59°54′N 35°56′E
Khripelevo	Хрипелево	9	59°54′N 36°06′E
Khudyakovo	Худяково	5	60°04′N 36°20′E
Kiino	Киино	175	60°02′N 35°45′E
Kindayevo	Киндаево	10	60°21′N 36°06′E
Kiyno	Кийно	90	60°02′N 35°45′E
Klavdino	Клавдино	10	59°10′N 36°02′E
Klyushovo	Клюшово	88	59°41′N 35°53′E
Koloshma	Колошма	532	60°10′N 35°25′E
Kolpino	Колпино	17	59°24′N 35°53′E
Komarovo (Borisovskoye Rural Settlement)	Комарово	10	60°00′N 36°08′E
Kondratovo	Кондратово	5	60°02′N 35°39′E
Konets	Конец	8	60°02′N 36°22′E
Kornilovo	Корнилово	2	59°52′N 36°02′E
Kosino	Косино	2	59°30′N 35°42′E
Kostenkovo	Костеньково	50	59°59′N 35°58′E
Kostino	Костино	15	59°52′N 36°12′E
Kostyay	Костяй	12	59°10′N 36°02′E
Krasikovo	Красиково	3	59°30′N 35°42′E
Krasnaya Gora	Красная Гора	47	60°15′N 35°41′E
Kyabelevo	Кябелево	8	60°01′N 35°46′E
Laboksha	Лабокша	13	59°46′N 35°54′E
Lebedevo	Лебедево	9	59°31′N 35°32′E
Loginovo	Логиново	1	59°59′N 35°49′E
Lukyanovo	Лукьяново	7	59°12′N 36°13′E
Lykovo	Лыково	16	59°56′N 36°12′E
Lyubochskaya Gorka	Любочская Горка	18	59°30′N 35°32′E
Lyutomlya	Лютомля	21	59°28′N 35°39′E
Makarovskaya	Макаровская	5	59°51′N 35°58′E
Makaryevskaya	Макарьевская	3	60°14′N 35°39′E
Malaya Pelpakhta	Малая Пельпахта	2	59°46′N 36°17′E
Maloye Borilovo	Малое Борилово	14	59°45′N 35°58′E
Maloye Borisovo	Малое Борисово	110	59°48′N 36°03′E
Malye Kipretsy	Малые Кипрецы	1	59°40′N 35°54′E
Mamayevo	Мамаево	39	60°07′N 36°10′E
Mamonovo	Мамоново	18	60°01′N 35°36′E
Markovo	Марково	24	60°16′N 36°25′E
Mayak-Gorka	Маяк-Горка	3	60°04′N 35°33′E
Minino	Минино	5	59°30′N 35°42′E
Morozovo	Морозово	67	60°02′N 35°45′E
Myatino	Мятино	7	59°54′N 36°01′E
Nazarovo	Назарово	2	59°59′N 35°58′E
Nefedovo	Нефедово	8	59°45′N 35°53′E
Nekrasovo	Некрасово	12	59°54′N 35°56′E
Nesterevo	Нестерово	13	59°46′N 36°03′E
Neverovo	Неверово	14	59°59′N 35°58′E
Nikitinskaya	Никитинская	4	60°15′N 35°40′E
Nikolskoye	Никольское	27	59°37′N 36°16′E
Nikonova Gora	Никонова Гора	32	60°21′N 36°06′E
Nikonovo	Никоново	14	59°58′N 35°59′E
Nizhny Konets	Нижний Конец	20	60°00′N 35°47′E
Nizhnyaya Nozhema	Нижняя Ножема	155	60°06′N 35°47′E
Noskovo	Носково	60	60°09′N 36°10′E
Novaya Derevnya	Новая Деревня	2	60°05′N 35°29′E
Novaya Starina	Новая Старина	252	59°59′N 35°58′E
Novaya	Новая	71	59°59′N 35°59′E
Novinka (Borisovskoye Rural Settlement)	Новинка	12	60°02′N 35°34′E
Novinka (Toropovskoye Rural Settlement)	Новинка	15	59°30′N 35°31′E
Novinka (Vepsskoye natsionalnoye Rural Settlement)	Новинка	8	60°05′N 36°09′E
Novoserkovo	Новосерково	62	60°06′N 36°10′E
Novoye Lukino	Новое Лукино	252	59°53′N 36°07′E
Ogryzovo	Огрызово	44	59°59′N 36°07′E
Olkhovik	Ольховик	23	59°20′N 36°17′E
Ovsyannikovo	Овсянниково	10	59°46′N 36°00′E
Paltsevo	Пальцево	14	59°32′N 36°01′E
Pankratovo	Панкратово	83	60°17′N 36°19′E
Papino (Borisovskoye Rural Settlement)	Папино	7	59°52′N 36°04′E
Papino (Dubrovskoye Rural Settlement)	Папино	35	59°12′N 36°12′E
Parfeyevo	Парфеево	17	60°00′N 35°52′E
Perekhodno	Переходно	3	59°25′N 35°48′E
Petrakovo	Петраково	1	59°34′N 36°02′E
Petryayevo	Петряево	27	59°12′N 36°09′E
Plaksino	Плаксино	5	59°31′N 35°41′E
Ploskoye	Плоское	2	59°44′N 35°41′E
Plyoso (settlement)	Плёсо	83	59°47′N 35°43′E
Plyoso (village)	Плёсо	70	59°47′N 35°43′E
Podberezka	Подберезка	52	60°04′N 36°09′E
Pogorelaya	Погорелая	18	60°14′N 35°40′E
Poroshino	Порошино	96	59°55′N 35°57′E
Pozhara	Пожара	355	59°57′N 36°05′E
Pozharishche	Пожарище	9	59°34′N 36°20′E
Pukhtayevo	Пухтаево	12	60°01′N 35°38′E
Pustoshka (Kuysky natsionalny vepssky Selsoviet)	Пустошка	11	60°01′N 35°38′E
Pustoshka (Timoshinsky Selsoviet)	Пустошка	10	60°10′N 36°10′E
Pyazhelka	Пяжелка	829	60°08′N 35°45′E
Ragozino	Рагозино	10	60°02′N 35°33′E
Rakunovo	Ракуново	64	60°01′N 36°23′E
Saninskaya	Санинская	356	59°36′N 36°03′E
Sautino	Саутино	87	60°05′N 36°19′E
Savinskaya	Савинская	27	60°08′N 36°10′E
Sedunovo	Седуново	2	59°35′N 36°00′E
Seliverstovo	Селиверстово	16	59°12′N 36°15′E
Semyonovskaya	Семёновская	5	59°50′N 36°06′E
Sergeyevo	Сергеево	6	60°05′N 36°19′E
Serkovo	Серково	1	59°36′N 35°59′E
Sharapova Gorka	Шарапова Горка	16	59°36′N 36°02′E
Sharapovo	Шарапово	25	60°00′N 36°01′E
Sharapovskaya Gorka	Шараповская Горка	1	60°00′N 36°01′E
Shchepye	Щепье	45	59°11′N 36°05′E
Sheino	Шеино	11	60°02′N 35°41′E
Shilovo	Шилово	2	60°04′N 35°47′E
Shiryayevskaya	Ширяевская	40	59°49′N 36°02′E
Shogda	Шогда	30	59°54′N 36°12′E
Sidorovo	Сидорово	2	59°51′N 36°07′E
Siuch (station)	Сиуч	24	59°16′N 36°25′E
Siuch (village)	Сиуч	77	59°16′N 36°26′E
Slatinskaya	Слатинская	39	59°36′N 36°16′E
Sloboda (Borisovskoye Rural Settlement)	Слобода	21	59°45′N 36°03′E
Sloboda (Vepsskoye natsionalnoye Rural Settlement)	Слобода	18	60°21′N 36°04′E
Sludno	Слудно	31	59°10′N 36°04′E
Smorodinka	Смородинка	452	59°29′N 35°39′E
Sorka	Сорка	37	59°38′N 36°04′E
Spirovo	Спирово	8	59°37′N 35°57′E
Stan	Стан	9	59°59′N 35°58′E
Starmuzh	Стармуж	7	59°57′N 36°08′E
Staroye Lukino	Старое Лукино	1	59°53′N 36°08′E
Stary Zavod	Старый Завод	9	59°29′N 35°38′E
Stepanovo	Степаново	5	59°30′N 35°41′E
Stunino	Стунино	30	59°59′N 36°22′E
Sumarokovo	Сумароково	25	59°51′N 36°04′E
Suvorovo	Суворово	45	59°58′N 36°07′E
Talashmanikha	Талашманиха	21	59°39′N 36°04′E
Tarasovo	Тарасово	7	60°04′N 35°47′E
Tarasovskaya	Тарасовская	7	60°14′N 35°40′E
Terekhova	Терехова	19	59°35′N 36°04′E
Terekhovaya	Тереховая	69	59°54′N 36°12′E
Terkovo	Терьково	74	60°01′N 36°08′E
Teshemlya	Тешемля	157	59°29′N 35°37′E
Teshemlya (station)	Тешемля	38	59°28′N 35°37′E
Timokhino	Тимохино	66	59°36′N 36°03′E
Timoshino	Тимошино	330	60°06′N 36°11′E
Timoshkino (Toropovskoye Rural Settlement)	Тимошкино	11	59°30′N 35°35′E
Timoshkino (Volodinskoye Rural Settlement)	Тимошкино	171	59°22′N 36°09′E
Tinyakovo	Тиняково	15	59°34′N 36°18′E
Tokarevo	Токарево	14	59°28′N 35°37′E
Toropovo	Торопово	492	59°29′N 35°39′E
Tretyakovskaya	Третьяковская	41	59°51′N 36°04′E
Tsipelevo	Ципелево	2	59°31′N 35°40′E
Tupik	Тупик	19	59°29′N 35°36′E
Turzhino	Туржино	9	60°21′N 36°06′E
Uglovaya	Угловая	8	60°04′N 36°09′E
Vanteyevo	Вантеево	21	59°30′N 35°37′E
Vasino	Васино	3	60°06′N 36°20′E
Vasyutino	Васютино	6	59°58′N 35°59′E
Velikovo	Великово	12	59°23′N 35°47′E
Verkhnevolsk	Верхневольск	29	59°30′N 35°26′E
Verkhnevolsky	Верхневольский	211	59°31′N 35°25′E
Verkhny Konets	Верхний Конец	35	60°04′N 35°30′E
Verkhnyaya Shoma	Верхняя Шома	9	60°00′N 35°56′E
Verkhovye	Верховье	9	59°41′N 35°58′E
Virino	Вирино	11	60°15′N 36°24′E
Vnina	Внина	16	59°08′N 35°59′E
Volkova	Волкова	79	59°34′N 36°16′E
Volkovo	Волково	87	59°52′N 36°07′E
Volodino	Володино	466	59°24′N 35°49′E
Vorokhobino	Ворохобино	9	59°29′N 35°36′E
Yakovlevskaya	Яковлевская	6	60°15′N 35°39′E
Yakutino	Якутино	20	60°01′N 36°23′E
Yangolokhta	Янголохта	50	60°11′N 36°09′E
Yanishevo	Янишево	14	60°05′N 35°46′E
Yartsevo	Ярцево	12	59°30′N 35°34′E
Yasnoye	Ясное	48	59°10′N 36°01′E
Zabolotye	Заболотье	45	60°16′N 36°16′E
Zaborye	Заборье	7	59°12′N 36°11′E
Zadny Dvor	Задний Двор	6	59°57′N 36°13′E
Zagrivye	Загривье	44	59°11′N 36°13′E
Zamoshye	Замошье	4	59°32′N 35°43′E
Zanino	Занино	27	59°54′N 35°55′E
Zapolye	Заполье	159	59°17′N 36°25′E
Zavod	Завод	3	60°02′N 35°36′E
Zayelnik	Заельник	12	59°45′N 35°42′E
Zvanets	Званец	47	59°09′N 36°01′E

== Babushkinsky District ==
Rural localities in Babushkinsky District:

Name	Name in Russian	Population (2002)	Coordinates
Afankovo	Афаньково	43	59°45′N 44°13′E
Aksenovo	Аксёново	20	59°43′N 43°19′E
Alexeykovo	Алексейково	67	59°54′N 43°45′E
Andreyevskoye	Андреевское	167	59°45′N 44°11′E
Anikovo	Аниково	141	59°23′N 43°44′E
Babya	Бабья	10	59°55′N 44°09′E
Belekhovo	Белехово	56	59°35′N 43°53′E
Belokrutets	Белокрутец	26	59°54′N 44°39′E
Berezovka	Березовка	325	59°56′N 43°43′E
Bezgachikha	Безгачиха	199	59°52′N 44°31′E
Bolshoy Dvor	Большой Двор	56	59°54′N 43°22′E
Borisovo	Борисово	13	59°27′N 44°07′E
Buchikha	Бучиха	132	59°51′N 44°31′E
Budkovo	Будьково	22	59°47′N 44°12′E
Chelishchevo	Челищево	65	59°44′N 44°13′E
Chupino	Чупино	40	59°58′N 43°45′E
Demyanovsky Pogost	Демьяновский Погост	255	59°54′N 43°25′E
Demyantsevo	Демьянцево	13	59°41′N 43°33′E
Dmitriyevo	Дмитриево	22	59°27′N 44°07′E
Dor	Дор	20	59°54′N 43°35′E
Dorkin Pochinok	Доркин Починок	20	59°55′N 43°40′E
Dresvyanovo	Дресвяново	2	59°44′N 44°10′E
Dudkino	Дудкино	120	59°51′N 44°31′E
Dushnevo	Душнево	64	59°28′N 43°59′E
Fetinino	Фетинино	45	59°23′N 43°46′E
Glebkovo	Глебково	37	59°43′N 43°35′E
Gorka (Bereznikovskoye)	Горка	5	59°22′N 43°57′E
Gorka (Minkovskoye)	Горка	87	59°42′N 43°34′E
Gorka (Roslyatinskoye)	Горка	1	59°58′N 44°07′E
Gorodishchevo	Городищево	75	59°50′N 44°33′E
Griva	Грива	10	59°48′N 44°21′E
Grozino	Грозино	39	59°42′N 43°28′E
Ida	Ида	759	59°20′N 43°09′E
Imeni Babushkina	Имени Бабушкина	4105	59°45′N 43°08′E
Isakovo	Исаково	31	59°49′N 44°35′E
Kharino	Харино	62	59°58′N 43°45′E
Kholm	Холм	55	59°53′N 43°39′E
Klimovskaya	Климовская	11	59°54′N 43°23′E
Koksharka	Кокшарка	153	59°51′N 44°32′E
Komsomolsky	Комсомольский	140	59°48′N 43°29′E
Korovenskaya	Коровенская	5	59°54′N 43°24′E
Korshunikha	Коршуниха	24	59°52′N 44°32′E
Kosikovo	Косиково	176	59°52′N 43°24′E
Kozhukhovo	Кожухово	93	59°45′N 44°09′E
Kozlets	Козлец	168	59°52′N 44°43′E
Krasota	Красота	186	59°45′N 44°10′E
Krutets	Крутец	46	59°55′N 44°40′E
Kryukovo	Крюково	56	59°49′N 44°22′E
Kulibarovo	Кулибарово	256	59°43′N 43°36′E
Kunozh	Кунож	360	59°16′N 43°45′E
Ledenga	Леденьга	23	59°55′N 42°52′E
Legitovo	Легитово	4	59°23′N 43°57′E
Levash	Леваш	19	59°38′N 43°30′E
Listvenka	Лиственка	15	59°47′N 44°15′E
Lnozavod	Льнозавод	88	59°41′N 43°28′E
Lodochnaya	Лодочная	12	59°54′N 43°27′E
Logduz	Ло́гдуз	300	60°00′N 44°44′E
Lukerino	Лукерино	67	59°43′N 44°13′E
Lyamenga	Ляменьга	65	59°51′N 44°32′E
Minkino	Минькино	4	59°29′N 44°04′E
Minkovo	Миньково	998	59°41′N 43°29′E
Mitino	Митино	3	59°49′N 43°17′E
Mulino	Мулино	13	59°59′N 43°43′E
Muravyovo	Муравьево	15	59°51′N 44°36′E
Nefedovo	Нефедово	2	59°48′N 44°32′E
Nikolayevo	Николаево	35	59°58′N 44°49′E
Ovsyannikovo	Овсянниково	111	59°56′N 43°42′E
Petukhovo	Петухово	40	59°30′N 43°34′E
Pleshkino	Плешкино	110	59°59′N 44°48′E
Pochinok	Починок	21	59°51′N 43°20′E
Podbolotye	Подболотье	196	59°52′N 44°34′E
Podgornaya (Babushkinskoye)	Подгорная	10	59°54′N 43°23′E
Podgornaya (Timanovskoye)	Подгорная	4	59°59′N 43°44′E
Polyudovo	Полюдово	87	59°46′N 44°17′E
Popovo	Попово	26	59°47′N 44°17′E
Pozharishche	Пожарище	40	59°59′N 43°43′E
Proskurnino	Проскурнино	11	59°47′N 43°28′E
Pustosh	Пустошь	15	59°21′N 43°39′E
Roslyatino	Рослятино	836	59°45′N 44°13′E
Rysenkovo	Рысенково	6	59°44′N 44°13′E
Selskaya	Сельская	31	59°50′N 44°24′E
Shilovo	Шилово	15	59°42′N 43°45′E
Shonorovo	Шонорово	13	59°49′N 44°16′E
Skokovo	Скоково	149	59°51′N 44°31′E
Skorodumovo	Скородумово	2	59°25′N 43°55′E
Sosnovka	Сосновка	159	59°52′N 44°30′E
Stari	Стари	3	59°53′N 43°28′E
Stepankovo	Степаньково	56	59°46′N 44°11′E
Suzdalikha	Суздалиха	64	59°52′N 44°31′E
Sumino	Сумино	22	59°49′N 44°35′E
Svertnevo	Свертнево	13	59°24′N 43°37′E
Talitsa	Талица	4	59°39′N 43°44′E
Tarabukino	Тарабукино	22	59°53′N 43°26′E
Telyakovo	Теляково	21	59°29′N 43°33′E
Terekhovo	Терехово	4	59°59′N 44°07′E
Tevigino	Тевигино	20	59°32′N 43°35′E
Timanova Gora	Тиманова Гора	196	59°56′N 43°42′E
Tinovatka	Тиноватка	102	59°40′N 43°23′E
Tupanovo	Тупаново	4	59°39′N 43°14′E
Varnavino	Варнавино	12	59°59′N 43°44′E
Vasilyevo	Васильево	190	59°28′N 43°58′E
Veliky Dvor	Великий Двор	235	59°41′N 43°50′E
Verkhoturye	Верхотурье	42	59°48′N 44°33′E
Volgino	Волгино	2	59°29′N 44°03′E
Voskresenskoye	Воскресенское	401	59°28′N 43°58′E
Vysokaya	Высокая	4	59°38′N 44°08′E
Yeremino	Еремино	87	59°43′N 43°35′E
Yurkino	Юркино	166	59°29′N 43°34′E
Yurmanga	Юрманга	469	59°46′N 43°07′E
Zaborye	Заборье	102	59°50′N 44°31′E
Zaychiki	Зайчики	598	59°35′N 44°07′E
Zelenik	Зеленик	26	59°51′N 43°28′E
Zhilkino	Жилкино	95	59°55′N 43°41′E
Zhubrino	Жубрино	231	59°46′N 44°19′E
Znamya	Знамя	7	59°46′N 44°14′E
Zubarikha	Зубариха	1	59°26′N 43°37′E

== Belozersky District ==
Rural localities in Belozersky District:

Name	Name in Russian	Population (2002)	Coordinates
Agashino	Агашино	6	59°46′N 37°46′E
Ageyevo	Агеево	19	59°50′N 37°50′E
Akinino	Акинино	8	59°44′N 36°53′E
Akishevo	Акишево	6	59°54′N 37°57′E
Aleksino	Алексино	14	59°44′N 37°39′E
Amosovo	Амосово	7	59°43′N 37°40′E
Anashkino	Анашкино	149	59°57′N 37°15′E
Anashkino (Paninskoye Rural Settlement)	Анашкино	8	60°04′N 37°01′E
Angozero	Ангозеро	8	59°50′N 37°52′E
Antonovo	Антоново	5	59°50′N 37°44′E
Antushevo	Антушево	249	59°54′N 37°40′E
Anufriyevo	Ануфриево	25	59°51′N 38°01′E
Artyushino	Артюшино	213	60°00′N 37°20′E
Bakino	Бакино	6	59°44′N 37°55′E
Barakovo	Бараково	6	60°00′N 36°44′E
Bechevinka	Бечевинка	284	59°44′N 37°40′E
Bekrenevo	Бекренево	7	59°47′N 36°44′E
Bely Ruchey	Белый Ручей	226	59°45′N 37°25′E
Bereznik	Березник	12	59°49′N 37°37′E
Berezovo	Березово	7	59°52′N 37°44′E
Bolshiye Krasnova	Большие Краснова	3	59°59′N 38°00′E
Bolshiye Novishki	Большие Новишки	55	59°49′N 37°40′E
Bolshoy Dvor-1	Большой Двор-1	14	60°05′N 36°59′E
Bolshoye Kozhino	Большое Кожино	1	59°57′N 37°56′E
Bolshoye Tretyakovo	Большое Третьяково	7	59°59′N 38°04′E
Bolshoye Zarechye	Большое Заречье	2	59°42′N 37°36′E
Borkovo	Борково	4	59°57′N 36°57′E
Borok	Борок	178	60°03′N 36°52′E
Boyarskaya	Боярская	7	59°48′N 36°42′E
Bubrovo	Буброво	23	60°00′N 37°18′E
Buozero	Буозеро	10	59°42′N 37°54′E
Cherkovo	Черково	12	59°48′N 37°44′E
Chikalevka	Чикалевка	2	59°47′N 37°49′E
Chikiyevo	Чикиево	25	60°01′N 37°58′E
Chirok	Чирок	8	60°01′N 37°11′E
Chulkovo	Чулково	40	59°54′N 37°42′E
Danilovo	Данилово	5	59°47′N 37°44′E
Davydovskaya	Давыдовская	5	59°58′N 38°05′E
Desyatovskaya	Десятовская	9	59°58′N 38°06′E
Dresvyanka	Дресвянка	22	59°56′N 37°27′E
Fedotovo	Федотово	7	59°50′N 37°35′E
Fedurino	Федурино	6	59°44′N 37°38′E
Fetinino	Фетинино	8	59°51′N 38°01′E
Filino	Филино	2	59°58′N 38°01′E
Filyayevo	Филяево	21	59°45′N 37°31′E
Fokino	Фокино	1	59°58′N 37°59′E
Fyodorovskaya	Фёдоровская	45	59°49′N 37°47′E
Georgiyevskoye	Георгиевское	195	59°43′N 36°52′E
Glushkovo	Глушково	163	60°01′N 37°55′E
Gorbusha	Горбуша	16	60°03′N 36°55′E
Gridino	Гридино	37	59°43′N 37°41′E
Grishino	Гришино	4	59°51′N 37°37′E
Guba	Губа	11	59°52′N 37°56′E
Gulino	Гулино	6	59°50′N 37°47′E
Iglino	Иглино	6	59°43′N 37°38′E
Ilevo	Илево	3	59°48′N 36°56′E
Ishtomar	Иштомар	3	59°46′N 36°48′E
Iskrino	Искрино	12	59°49′N 36°42′E
Ivankovo	Иваньково	4	60°11′N 36°58′E
Ivanovskaya	Ивановская	2	59°46′N 36°42′E
Ivanovskoye	Ивановское	7	59°41′N 36°51′E
Ivanovsky	Ивановский	303	60°16′N 36°48′E
Kalinino	Калинино	11	59°59′N 36°55′E
Kamennik	Каменник	17	59°52′N 36°58′E
Karl Libknekht	Карл Либкнехт	343	59°57′N 37°12′E
Karpovo	Карпово	2	59°47′N 37°50′E
Karpovo (Paninskoye Rural Settlement)	Карпово	31	60°01′N 36°44′E
Katilovo	Катилово	6	59°44′N 37°33′E
Kema	Кема	10	59°48′N 37°42′E
Kharshino	Харшино	11	59°57′N 37°57′E
Khlopuzovo	Хлопузово	20	59°51′N 37°35′E
Kiryanovskaya	Кирьяновская	16	59°57′N 38°06′E
Klimshin Bor	Климшин Бор	163	59°54′N 36°59′E
Klyuchi	Ключи	1	59°50′N 36°41′E
Kolodino	Колодино	57	60°01′N 37°56′E
Konets Mondra	Конец Мондра	25	60°02′N 36°38′E
Korkovo	Корково	15	59°56′N 37°32′E
Korovino	Коровино	22	59°43′N 37°34′E
Kostino, Gulinsky Selsoviet	Костино	45	59°45′N 37°55′E
Kostino, Paninsky Selsoviet	Костино	18	60°03′N 36°54′E
Krokhino	Кро́хино	0	60°04′N 38°02′E
Kukina Gora	Кукина Гора	7	60°05′N 36°58′E
Kukshevo	Кукшево	92	59°54′N 37°56′E
Kunost	Куность	372	60°01′N 37°37′E
Kurdyug	Курдюг	1	60°28′N 37°04′E
Kuryagino	Курягино	10	59°42′N 37°37′E
Kuzminka	Кузьминка	2	59°52′N 37°56′E
Kuznechikha	Кузнечиха	1	59°51′N 37°47′E
Kuznetsovo	Кузнецово	8	60°25′N 36°47′E
Lapino	Лапино	6	59°53′N 38°02′E
Lavrovo	Лаврово	411	59°51′N 37°22′E
Lavrushino	Лаврушино	4	60°11′N 36°54′E
Lesukovo	Лесуково	2	59°51′N 37°55′E
Levkovo	Левково	41	59°52′N 37°41′E
Linyakovo	Линяково	2	60°19′N 36°40′E
Lokhta	Лохта	6	60°00′N 37°06′E
Lukino	Лукино	9	59°59′N 38°05′E
Lukyanovo	Лукьяново	15	60°20′N 36°55′E
Lundino	Лундино	25	59°46′N 37°47′E
Maeksa	Маэкса	474	60°01′N 37°42′E
Maloye Kozhino	Малое Кожино	4	59°57′N 37°56′E
Maloye Tretyakovo	Малое Третьяково	3	59°59′N 38°05′E
Malye Krasnova	Малые Краснова	11	59°59′N 38°00′E
Malyutino	Малютино	10	59°43′N 37°36′E
Markovo	Марково	2	60°00′N 37°38′E
Martynovo	Мартыново	3	60°19′N 36°40′E
Maslovo	Маслово	2	60°01′N 37°49′E
Maximovo	Максимово	2	59°44′N 37°55′E
Megrinsky	Мегринский	248	60°10′N 37°07′E
Mikhalevo	Михалёво	12	60°04′N 37°00′E
Mironovo	Мироново	10	59°56′N 36°58′E
Mitino	Митино	159	60°18′N 36°57′E
Molino	Молино	3	60°20′N 36°41′E
Monastyrskaya	Монастырская	6	60°01′N 37°50′E
Moskvino	Москвино	6	59°52′N 38°02′E
Mys	Мыс	3	59°52′N 37°57′E
Mystino	Мыстино	10	60°00′N 36°44′E
Nadkobovo	Надкобово	3	59°51′N 38°03′E
Nefedovo	Нефедово	2	59°46′N 37°50′E
Nikitkino	Никиткино	8	59°59′N 37°59′E
Nikolayevo	Николаево	3	59°49′N 36°55′E
Nikonovskaya	Никоновская	353	59°49′N 37°48′E
Nikonovskaya (Antushevskoye Rural Settlement)	Никоновская	11	59°52′N 37°41′E
Nizhny Dvor	Нижний Двор	2	60°20′N 36°41′E
Nizhnyaya Mondoma	Нижняя Мондома	1044	60°01′N 37°30′E
Novo	Ново	4	60°24′N 36°46′E
Novomaximovo	Новомаксимово	5	59°51′N 37°34′E
Olkino	Олькино	4	59°46′N 36°46′E
Orlovo	Орлово	14	59°46′N 37°47′E
Ostrov Sladky	Остров Сладкий	121	59°57′N 37°14′E
Ostrov	Остров	2	59°50′N 37°45′E
Ostyunino	Остюнино	10	59°45′N 37°31′E
Palkino	Палкино	4	59°45′N 37°29′E
Paltsevo	Пальцево	14	59°51′N 37°42′E
Panevo	Панево	3	59°42′N 36°50′E
Paninskaya	Панинская	122	60°03′N 36°53′E
Pankovo	Паньково	6	59°42′N 37°39′E
Pankratovka	Панкратовка	200	60°01′N 37°53′E
Pautovo	Паутово	7	59°43′N 37°54′E
Perkhloyda	Перхлойда	11	59°48′N 36°51′E
Perkhovta	Перховта	47	59°50′N 37°41′E
Perkumz	Перкумзь	28	60°01′N 36°59′E
Pershkovo	Першково	1	59°53′N 38°02′E
Pindino	Пиндино	3	59°53′N 37°54′E
Ploskoye	Плоское	3	59°42′N 36°51′E
Podgorye	Подгорье	9	59°44′N 37°41′E
Podsosenye	Подсосенье	6	60°25′N 36°50′E
Polenovskaya	Поленовская	17	59°50′N 37°36′E
Polynino	Полынино	10	59°47′N 37°44′E
Popovka	Поповка	2	59°56′N 37°27′E
Popovo	Попово	5	59°46′N 37°51′E
Poteryayevo	Потеряево	6	59°58′N 38°03′E
Prokino	Прокино	10	59°43′N 36°52′E
Pushkino	Пушкино	4	59°56′N 37°56′E
Pyashnitsa	Пяшница	13	59°51′N 36°41′E
Ragozino	Рагозино	9	59°57′N 36°57′E
Roshchino	Рощино	4	59°46′N 37°48′E
Roslyakovo	Росляково	30	60°01′N 37°53′E
Rostani	Ростани	45	59°55′N 37°42′E
Rykhlyanda	Рыхлянда	1	59°59′N 37°55′E
Sadovaya	Садовая	11	60°00′N 37°57′E
Safronovo	Сафроново	4	59°49′N 36°53′E
Savino	Савино	5	59°42′N 37°39′E
Savino (Gulinskoye Rural Settlement)	Савино	5	59°46′N 37°54′E
Semeino	Семеино	7	59°50′N 37°48′E
Shubach	Шубач	2	59°50′N 36°41′E
Sidorovo	Сидорово	3	59°52′N 37°46′E
Silkino	Силькино	3	60°01′N 37°48′E
Sloboda	Слобода	27	60°21′N 36°54′E
Smolino	Смолино	20	60°18′N 36°56′E
Srednyaya	Средняя	11	59°46′N 37°27′E
Srednyaya	Средняя	5	59°57′N 37°11′E
Staroye Selo	Старое Село	27	59°53′N 37°43′E
Staroye Selo (Sholskoye Rural Settlement)	Старое Село	20	60°11′N 36°58′E
Tarasovo	Тарасово	7	59°53′N 37°38′E
Tarshinskaya	Таршинская	1	60°25′N 36°50′E
Timofeyevskaya	Тимофеевская	3	60°25′N 36°46′E
Timonino	Тимонино	52	59°58′N 38°00′E
Tomashino	Томашино	2	59°43′N 37°36′E
Trunino	Трунино	1	59°46′N 37°50′E
Tsarevo	Царево	6	60°23′N 36°47′E
Turikovo	Туриково	7	59°59′N 37°56′E
Ugol	Угол	7	59°45′N 37°28′E
Ulyankino	Ульянкино	17	59°59′N 37°22′E
Uritskoye	Урицкое	12	60°01′N 36°40′E
Ustye	Устье	23	59°57′N 37°09′E
Ustye, Sholsky Selsoviet	Устье	5	60°11′N 36°54′E
Vanyutino	Ванютино	28	59°43′N 36°50′E
Vasyutino	Васютино	3	60°11′N 36°56′E
Vatamanovo	Ватаманово	5	59°49′N 37°46′E
Veregonets	Верегонец	12	60°02′N 37°55′E
Vereshchagino	Верещагино	9	59°43′N 37°42′E
Verkhnyaya Mondoma	Верхняя Мондома	30	59°56′N 37°29′E
Verkhovye	Верховье	23	60°19′N 36°56′E
Vertino	Вертино	13	59°56′N 37°32′E
Vizma	Визьма	263	59°53′N 37°04′E
Vozdvizhenye	Воздвиженье	14	59°53′N 38°01′E
Vozmozero	Возмозеро	3	59°52′N 37°37′E
Vysokaya Gora	Высокая Гора	22	59°53′N 37°02′E
Yakovlevo	Яковлево	19	59°49′N 37°44′E
Yakutino	Якутино	7	59°41′N 37°38′E
Yamskaya	Ямская	96	60°02′N 37°49′E
Yekimovo	Екимово	2	59°55′N 37°15′E
Yemelyanovskaya	Емельяновская	11	59°56′N 37°32′E
Yenino	Енино	45	59°51′N 37°21′E
Yeremeyevo	Еремеево	9	59°50′N 37°35′E
Yershovo	Ершово	18	59°50′N 37°49′E
Yesino	Есино	31	60°19′N 36°57′E
Yesipovo	Есипово	11	60°01′N 38°01′E
Yurino	Юрино	51	60°05′N 37°00′E
Yurino	Юрино	11	60°20′N 36°55′E
Zadnyaya	Задняя	3	59°47′N 37°28′E
Zamoshye	Замошье	39	59°48′N 36°56′E
Zaretskaya	Зарецкая	28	60°03′N 36°52′E
Zhidkovo	Жидково	3	59°51′N 37°56′E
Zininskaya	Зининская	2	59°53′N 36°57′E
Zorino	Зорино	124	59°54′N 37°41′E
Zubovo	Зубово	7	59°49′N 37°50′E
Zubovo	Зубово	1518	60°19′N 36°59′E
Zvoz	Звоз	8	59°46′N 37°44′E

== Chagodoshchensky District ==
Rural localities in Chagodoshchensky District:

- Alexeyevskoye
- Anishino
- Anisimovo
- Babushkino
- Baranovo
- Belskoye
- Belye Kresty
- Berezye
- Borisovo
- Bortnikovo
- Chagoda
- Cherenskoye
- Chikusovo
- Dubrova
- Fishovo
- Fryazino
- Gora
- Grechnevo
- Grigoryevo
- Ignashino
- Izboishchi
- Kabozha
- Kharchikha
- Klypino
- Kochubino
- Kolobovo
- Kostyleva Gora
- Kotovo
- Krasnaya Gorka
- Leshutino
- Leshutinskaya Gora
- Lukinskoye
- Lvov Dvor
- Makhovo
- Malashkino
- Mardas
- Maryino
- Megrino
- Metelishchi
- Mishino
- Naumovskoye
- Niz
- Novaya
- Novinka
- Oksyukovo
- Okulovo
- Olisovo
- Osipovo
- Panik
- Pervomaysky
- Podlipye
- Pokrovskoye
- Puchnino
- Pustyn
- Remenevo
- Selishche
- Semovo
- Seredka
- Sholokhovo
- Sirotovo
- Smerdomsky
- Trukhino
- Trukhnovo
- Usadishchi
- Valun
- Valye
- Yerokhovo
- Zagorye
- Zalozno
- Zaruchevye
- Zhernovitsy
- Zubovo

== Cherepovetsky District ==
Rural localities in Cherepovetsky District:

- Abakanovo
- Afanasovo
- Akinkhovo
- Anashkino
- Andogsky
- Anfalovo
- Anisimovka
- Annino
- Antonovo
- Arkhangelskoye
- Avdeyevskaya
- Baranovo
- Barskoye Pole
- Baskakovo
- Batran
- Batransky
- Bavlenskoye
- Beketovo
- Belavino
- Berezovik
- Bocheyno
- Bolshaya Dora
- Bolshaya Dubrovka
- Bolshaya Novinka
- Bolshaya Shormanga
- Bolshiye Strazhi
- Bolshiye Ugly
- Bolshoy Istok
- Bolshoye Kalinnikovo
- Bolshoye Krasnovo
- Bolshoye Novo
- Bor
- Borok
- Botilo
- Botovo
- Braslavl
- Brod
- Burtsevo
- Buzakovo
- Bykovo
- Bystrino
- Chabino
- Chastobovo
- Chayevo
- Chechino
- Chernevo
- Chikeyevo
- Chikovo
- Chuksha
- Dargun
- Davydovo
- Dementyevo
- Demidovo
- Deminskaya
- Demyanka
- Derevnishcha
- Dermyaninskoye
- Dmitriyevo
- Dobrynskoye
- Dolgusha
- Dora
- Dorka
- Dorki
- Dorofeyevo
- Doronino
- Dubnishnoye
- Dubrovo
- Fedorkovo
- Fedosovo
- Fenevo
- Filippovo
- Firyutino
- Fokino
- Fominskoye
- Frolkovo
- Galinskoye
- Ganino
- Gavino
- Glinskoye
- Glukhaya Lokhta
- Gora
- Gorely Pochinok
- Gorka-Zarechye
- Gorodishche
- Gosha
- Grenevo
- Grigorevo
- Grigoryevo
- Grigoryevskoye
- Grishutino
- Gurlevo
- Ignatyevo
- Ilmovik
- Ilyina Gora
- Ionovo
- Irdomatka
- Iskra
- Ivanovo
- Ivanovskoye
- Ivantsevo
- Kachalka
- Karelskaya Mushnya
- Kargach
- Karmanitsa
- Katayevo
- Katilovo
- Khantanovo
- Kharinskaya
- Kharlamovskaya
- Khemalda
- Khlamovo
- Khmelevoye
- Khmelina
- Khutorok
- Khvoshchevik
- Kiselevo
- Kizboy
- Klimovo
- Klimovskaya
- Klimovskoye
- Klopuzovo
- Kodino
- Koino
- Kokorevo
- Kolkach
- Konechnoye
- Korablevo
- Kornigovka
- Korotnevo
- Korotovo
- Kostenevo
- Kostyayevka
- Kostyayevo
- Kotovo
- Kozokhta
- Kraskovo
- Krasny Dvor
- Krivets
- Krominskaya
- Krylovo
- Kuksino
- Kumino
- Kunshino
- Kurgan
- Kurtsevo
- Kuryakovo
- Kustets
- Kuzmino
- Ladygino
- Laptevo
- Lavrovo
- Ledinino
- Lenino
- Leontyevka
- Leontyevo
- Lesnoye
- Likhachevo
- Lipnik
- Litvinovo
- Lokhta
- Losha
- Lukinskoye
- Lysaya Gora
- Makoveyevo
- Maksakovo
- Makutino
- Malata
- Malaya Dora
- Malaya Dubrovka
- Malaya Lipenka
- Malaya Shormanga
- Malechkino
- Maloye Kalinnikovo
- Maloye Novo
- Maltsevo
- Maly Istok
- Malye Strazhi
- Malye Ugly
- Markhinino
- Maryinskaya
- Maslovo
- Meleda
- Mikhaylovskoye
- Mikheyevo
- Mindyukino
- Minino
- Mishino
- Mitenskoye
- Molokovo
- Mukhino
- Muravyovo
- Muzga
- Myaksa
- Mydyevo
- Myshkino
- Nadporozhye
- Nazarovskaya
- Nekrasovo
- Nelazskoye
- Nesterovskoye
- Neverov Bor
- Nikolo-Ramenye
- Nikolskoye
- Nikulino
- Nizhny Angoboy
- Nosovskoye
- Nova
- Novaya Derevnya
- Novaya Svobodka
- Novaya Yagnitsa
- Novaya
- Novodubrovka
- Novogorodovo
- Novosela
- Novotryumovo
- Novoye Domozerovo
- Novoye Zakharovo
- Nyagoslovo
- Nyankino
- Ochenikovo
- Oseyevskaya
- Ozero
- Pakhotino
- Panteleymonovskoye
- Parshino
- Pastoch
- Patino
- Pavlichevo
- Pavlokovo
- Pavlovo
- Pavlovskoye
- Pazhetskoye
- Perkhino
- Pesye
- Petrakovo
- Petrino
- Petrovskoye
- Piyevo
- Plenishnik
- Pleshanovo
- Ploskovo
- Ploskoye
- Pokrov
- Pokrovskoye
- Polezhayevo
- Poluyevo
- Povarovo
- Prislon
- Privalino
- Prokshino
- Pronino
- Pustoshka
- Rabotino
- Roshchino
- Roslino
- Ruchyi
- Ruzhbovo
- Ryabovo
- Ryazan
- Ryzhkovo
- Sandalovo
- Sannikovo
- Selishche
- Selivanovo
- Seltsa
- Seltso-Ryabovo
- Sergeyevo
- Shabanova Gora
- Shalimovo
- Shchetinskoye
- Shelkovo
- Shepelevo
- Sheyno
- Shilovka
- Shilovo
- Shishovka
- Shukhobod
- Shuklino
- Shurovo
- Skovyatino
- Slabeyevo
- Slobodino
- Sobolevo
- Sokolnikovo
- Solmanskoye
- Sosnovka
- Soyvolovskaya
- Spas-Lom
- Spirovo
- Sredneye
- Sredniye Chudi
- Stariki
- Staroye Domozerovo
- Staroye Zakharovo
- Stepanovo
- Stepantsevo
- Suda
- Sukovatka
- Sumino
- Supronovo
- Surkovo
- Suzorovo
- Sychevo
- Tekar
- Tekutovo
- Tereben
- Terekhovo
- Terino
- Timovo
- Titovo
- Tokovye
- Tolstikovo
- Tonshalovo
- Travlivka
- Trofankovo
- Trofimovo
- Troitskoye
- Trushnevo
- Tsarevo
- Tsikovo
- Turmanskoye
- Tyabunino
- Tynovo
- Tyushkovo
- Tyutnevo
- Ugryumovo
- Ulazorsky
- Uloma
- Ulyanovo
- Usishchevo
- Vaneyevo
- Vangino
- Vaskovo
- Vasyukovo
- Velikaya
- Velyamikovo
- Veretye
- Verhny Angoboy
- Verkh
- Veshnyaki
- Vichelovo
- Viterzhevo
- Vladimirovka
- Volkovo
- Voronino
- Vorontsovo
- Vorotynya
- Voshchazhnikovo
- Voynovo
- Yaganovo
- Yagnitsa
- Yagodnaya
- Yakonskoye
- Yakovlevo
- Yartsevo
- Yashnevo
- Yasnaya Polyana
- Yekimovo
- Yelekhovo
- Yelninskoye
- Yeltukhovo
- Yelyakhino
- Yenyukovo
- Yeremeyevo
- Yershovo
- Yevrasovo
- Yugi
- Yuryevets
- Zadniye Chudi
- Zakukoboy
- Zaosechye
- Zaruchevye
- Zavidovo
- Zayakoshye
- Zharki
- Zhavoronkovo
- Zhdanovskaya
- Zolotilovo

== Gryazovetsky District ==
Rural localities in Gryazovetsky District:

- Abanino
- Agrafenka
- Akinfovitsa
- Aleksino
- Anankino
- Andrakovo
- Anninskoye
- Anokhino
- Anopino
- Anosovo
- Antipino
- Arefino
- Arkatovo
- Arsenka
- Artemovo
- Baksheyka
- Bakshino
- Balagurovo
- Barskoye
- Barskoye-Syrishchevo
- Basarigino
- Batovo
- Bekrenevo
- Bel
- Belovo
- Blazny
- Bogdanovo
- Bokotovo
- Bolshiye Dvorishcha
- Bolshoy Dor
- Bolshoye Brodino
- Bolshoye Denisyevo
- Bolshoye Kosikovo
- Bolshoye Kostino
- Bolshoye Zaymishche
- Bubeykino
- Burtsevo
- Bushuikha
- Bushuikha
- Chagrino
- Chernava
- Chernetskoye
- Chernitsyno
- Chernogubovo
- Chistopyanovo
- Chukharitsa
- Chuprovo
- Chuvaksino
- Demyankovo
- Demyanovo
- Devyat Izb
- Dikarevo
- Dolotovo
- Dresvishche
- Dubovka
- Dudenevo
- Dvorets
- Dyadinskoye
- Dyakonovo
- Dyakovo
- Dyukosovo
- Fedorkovo
- Fedyaykino
- Fetinino
- Filippovo
- Fomskoye
- Frol
- Galkino
- Gari
- Gavrakovo
- Gerasimovo
- Golubkovo
- Gora
- Goritsy
- Gorka
- Ileykino
- Ilyinskoye
- Isady
- Isakovo
- Ivnyak
- Ivonino
- Iyevlevo
- Kalinkino
- Kameshnik
- Kanevo
- Kargino
- Kashino
- Kastikha
- Kelyino
- Khaymino
- Khlebnikovo
- Khlyzino
- Khoroshevo
- Khudynino
- Khvastovo
- Kirpichnoye
- Kirpichny Zavod
- Kiselevo
- Klikunovo
- Klimkovo
- Klobukino
- Knyazevo
- Kobyakovo
- Kolotilikha
- Konstantinovo
- Korbino
- Kornilyevo
- Kornilyevskaya Sloboda
- Korotygino
- Koryuchevo
- Kosarovo
- Koshkino
- Kostino
- Krasnoye
- Krestovka
- Krivodino
- Krutets
- Kuksimovo
- Kurapovo
- Kurochkino
- Kuzemkino
- Lezha
- Loginovo
- Lomok
- Lukyanovo
- Lupochino
- Lyabzunka
- Maklakovo
- Maksimovitsa
- Markashovo
- Martyakovo
- Martynovo
- Mikhalevo
- Mikhalkovo
- Minkino
- Mishutino
- Mokeyevo
- Mukhino
- Munikovo
- Muravyovo
- Myasnikovka
- Myasnikovo
- Nadorozhny Lipovik
- Nazarka
- Nekhotovo
- Neklyudovo
- Nikola-Penye
- Nikulkino
- Nikultsevo
- Nizhnyaya Pustyn
- Nizovka
- Novoye
- Novoye-na-Lukhte
- Novy Dor
- Oberikha
- Obnorskaya Sloboda
- Obraztsovo
- Obukhovo
- Okhlyuyevo
- Ostanino
- Ovinishcha
- Palkino
- Paltsevo
- Panfilovo
- Pankratovo
- Panovo
- Parshino
- Pavlovskoye
- Peredkovo
- Pirogovo
- Piterimka
- Ploskoye
- Plyushchevo
- Podberezhsky
- Podkamenka
- Pogiblovo
- Polovoz
- Poltinino
- Polukhino
- Polushkino
- Popovkino
- Popovo
- Posyolok Lnozavoda
- Prokopyevo
- Putilovo
- Puzovo
- Ragozino
- Rakovo
- Ramenye
- Remennikovo
- Rodionovo
- Rostilovo
- Ryabinovka
- Rzhishcha
- Savkino
- Sementsevo
- Semeykino
- Senga
- Serezhino
- Shaldanovo
- Shemeykino
- Shepyakovo
- Shevyakovo
- Shilmyashevo
- Shirakovo
- Shnyakino
- Shushukovo
- Sidorovo
- Sidorovskoye
- Silifonovo
- Sitnikovo
- Skalino
- Skalino
- Slobodishcha
- Sopelkino
- Spas-Nurma
- Spasskoye
- Stanovishchevo
- Stary Dor
- Stepanovo
- Stepkovo
- Stepurino
- Stroyevo
- Studenets
- Suvorkovo
- Suvorovo
- Svinino
- Svistunovo
- Sychevo
- Tarasovo
- Tarshino
- Telebino
- Tretnikovo
- Troitskoye
- Tselennikovo
- Tsepelka
- Tufanovo
- Tufanovo
- Uglentsevo
- Ulyanovka
- Vaganovo
- Vanchino
- Varaksino
- Vasilevo
- Vasilyevka
- Vasyukovo
- Vederkovo
- Velikoretsky Lipovik
- Verkhnyaya Pustyn
- Vislyakovo
- Vokhtoga
- Volnoye-Syrishchevo
- Volotskoy
- Volynevo
- Voronino
- Voskresenskoye
- Vostorgsky
- Vosya
- Vosya
- Vozdvizhenskoye
- Voznesenye
- Vyborovo
- Vysokovo
- Yelkhovka
- Yelnik
- Yermolino
- Yesyutkino
- Yevdokimovo
- Yevsyukovo
- Yudino
- Yunosheskoye
- Yurovo
- Zadorka
- Zakharovo
- Zasechnoye
- Zayemye
- Zazholka
- Zhelominino
- Zhernokovo
- Zimnyak
- Zvyaglovka

== Kaduysky District ==
Rural localities in Kaduysky District:

- Abakanovo
- Aksentyevskaya
- Alekanovo
- Alenkino
- Alyavino
- Andronovo
- Annenskaya
- Baranovskaya
- Berezhok
- Bilkovo
- Bolshaya Gorka
- Bolshaya Rukavitskaya
- Bolshoy Smerdyach
- Bor
- Borisovo
- Boylovo
- Bryukhovo
- Budimorovo
- Buzykino
- Cherepanovo
- Chudinovo
- Chuprino
- Churovo
- Danilkovo
- Dedovets
- Dilskiye
- Dubrovnoye
- Dyomshino
- Fadeyevo
- Falenskaya
- Fanerny Zavod
- Filino
- Grigorovo
- Ilemnoye
- Ishkoboy
- Ivachevo
- Ivanovo
- Ivanovskoye
- Izorkovo
- Kaduy
- Kalinnikovo
- Kananyevskaya
- Kapchino
- Khlamovo
- Kholmishche
- Koposovo
- Korotnevaya
- Kovalyovo
- Krasnaya Zarya
- Krestovaya
- Krugloye
- Kryltsovo
- Kulikovo
- Kurakino
- Kuzminka
- Larionovskaya
- Lebenets
- Lepilovo
- Log
- Lukyanovo
- Lykovskaya
- Maksinskaya
- Malafeyevo
- Malaya Gorka
- Malaya Rukavitskaya
- Malaya Stupolokhta
- Maly Smerdyach
- Malyshevo
- Markovskaya
- Marlykovo
- Martyukhino
- Marygino
- Maza
- Melekhino
- Melentyevo
- Mikhalevo
- Mikhaylovskaya
- Moshnitskoye
- Myza
- Nikolskoye
- Nikonovskaya
- Niz
- Nizhniye
- Nizhniye
- Nizhny Pochinok
- Novinka
- Novoye
- Oseka
- Panyukovo
- Pelemen
- Ploskoye
- Porog
- Posobkovo
- Postnikovo
- Preobrazhenskaya
- Pryagayevo
- Pryamikovo
- Pugino
- Rykanets
- Safonovo
- Savelyevskaya
- Selishche
- Seltso-Rodnoye
- Seninskaya
- Shigodskiye
- Shiryevo
- Shoborovo
- Sloboda
- Smeshkovo
- Solokhta
- Sosnovka
- Spirenskaya
- Spiryutino
- Sredny Dvor
- Srednyaya Stupolokhta
- Stan
- Starostino
- Starukhi
- Strelkovo
- Sudakovo
- Syobra
- Timokhino
- Tomasha
- Tsipelevo
- Turpal
- Uspenskoye
- Ust-Kolp
- Vakhonkino
- Vasilyevskaya
- Velikoye
- Veliky Dvor
- Verkhny Dvor
- Verkhovye
- Vershina
- Vertyagino
- Volotskaya
- Voron
- Yakimovo
- Yakshinskaya
- Yamyshevo
- Yaryshevo
- Yazvitsevo
- Yeremeyevo
- Zadnyaya Stupolokhta
- Zaerap
- Zakazarye
- Zanino
- Zaozerye
- Zaruchevye
- Zavod
- Zayatskoye
- Zhidelevo
- Zhornovets
- Zhukov Pochinok
- Zykovo

== Kharovsky District ==
Rural localities in Kharovsky District:

- 17 km
- 6 km
- Afoninskaya
- Andreyevskaya
- Anfalikha
- Arzubikha
- Aseikha
- Balukovskaya
- Baranikha
- Bashmanovo
- Belenitsyno
- Belyayevskaya
- Berezhok
- Bilgachevo
- Bilskaya
- Bolshaya Serednyaya
- Bor
- Borisovskaya
- Borovikovo
- Budrikha
- Bugra
- Burchevskaya
- Bychikha
- Bykovo
- Cheremukhovo
- Chernukhino
- Chichirikha
- Churilovo
- Denisovskaya
- Derevenka Kuznechikha
- Derevenka Shapshinskaya
- Derevenka
- Derevyagino
- Deshinskoye
- Ditinskaya
- Dmitriyevo
- Dolgishchevo
- Dolgoborodovo
- Dorogushikha
- Dresvyanka
- Drobinino
- Druzhinino
- Durovskaya
- Dyagilevo
- Dyakovskaya
- Fedorovskoye
- Filinskoye
- Filippovo
- Fominskoye
- Glazikha
- Gorbatikha
- Gorka Kizimskaya
- Gorka Podselnaya
- Gorokhovka
- Gostinskaya
- Grechutino
- Gribtsovskaya
- Grishino
- Grudinskaya
- Ilyinskaya Popovka
- Ishenino
- Istomikha
- Ivachino
- Ivachinskaya
- Ivanikovo
- Ivashevo
- Karpovskoye
- Khalchikha
- Kharenskoye
- Kharitonikha
- Khomok
- Khomutovo
- Kiyevskaya
- Klepestikha
- Knyazhaya
- Kogarikha
- Konantsevo
- Konechnaya
- Konevo
- Korovikha
- Korovinskaya
- Kosarikha
- Kostino
- Kozhinskaya
- Kozlikha
- Kozlovo
- Krasimikha
- Krutets
- Kryukovo
- Kryukovskaya
- Kudryavtsevo
- Kuleshikha
- Kumzero
- Kunitsyno
- Kupaikha
- Kuryanovskaya
- Kuzminskoye
- Kuznechikha
- Kuznetsovskaya
- Kuzovlevo
- Kvashnikha
- Lapikha
- Larionikha
- Lavrikha
- Lebezh
- Lekalikha
- Leshyovo
- Leunikha
- Lisino
- Lobanikha
- Loginovskaya
- Loshchinikha
- Lukino
- Lukinskaya
- Lysovskaya
- Makarovskaya
- Malaya Serednyaya
- Mankovo
- Martynovskoye
- Maslovskaya
- Matveikha-Ramenskaya
- Maximikha
- Melentyevskaya
- Mezhdurechye
- Mezhurki
- Mikhalevo
- Mikhaylovskoye
- Mishakovo
- Mishkovskoye
- Mitikha
- Mogilenskaya
- Mokeyevskaya
- Muryginskaya
- Nasonovo
- Nazarikha
- Nelyubovskaya
- Nikulinskoye
- Nizhne-Kubensky
- Obrochnaya
- Obrochnoye
- Odenyevskaya
- Oleshkovo
- Osipikha
- Ostretsovskaya
- Palkinskaya
- Palkovskaya
- Paninskaya
- Pankovskaya
- Panovskoye
- Pashinskaya
- Pashuchikha
- Paunikha
- Pekhtikha
- Pereks
- Perepechino
- Pichikha
- Pikhtinskaya
- Pleshavka
- Plesnikha
- Plyasovo
- Podosharikha
- Pogost Nikolsky
- Polutikha
- Popchikha
- Popovka
- Poshivchikha
- Pronikha
- Punduga
- Ratnovskaya
- Sablukovo
- Samsonikha
- Savinskaya
- Savkovskaya
- Semenikha
- Semigorodnyaya
- Sergeikha
- Sergeyevskaya
- Sergozero
- Shapsha
- Shchukinskaya
- Shemyakino
- Shenurovo
- Shikhanikha
- Shilykovo
- Shutovo
- Sibla
- Simanikha
- Sinyakovo
- Sitinsky
- Slobodka
- Sokolovskaya
- Sopyatino
- Sorozhino
- Sosnovka
- Sotonikha
- Spasskaya
- Spichikha
- Stegaikha
- Sudovo
- Sychevo
- Sysoikha
- Tereshikha
- Tikhonino
- Tokarevo
- Tomashka
- Tsarikha
- Tsiposhevskaya
- Tyushkovskaya
- Ugol
- Ugolskaya
- Ulasovskaya
- Ustrechnaya
- Vakhrunikha
- Varlamovo
- Vatalovo
- Vaulikha
- Veliky Dvor
- Volchikha
- Volonga
- Voronino
- Vozrozhdeniye
- Yakushevo
- Yaskino
- Yekimovskaya
- Yerofeyevskaya
- Yesipovskaya
- Yudinskaya
- Yurtinskaya
- Zakharikha
- Zakharovskoye
- Zalesnaya
- Zarodikha
- Zarubino
- Zasukhino
- Zherlichikha
- Zhukovskaya
- Zimnitsa
- Zolotava
- Zolotogorka
- Zuyena

== Kichmengsko-Gorodetsky District ==
Rural localities in Kichmengsko-Gorodetsky District:

- Akimovo
- Aksyonovshchina
- Alferovo
- Ananino
- Antsiferovo Ramenye
- Artemyevskaya
- Baklanikha
- Baklanovskaya Melnitsa
- Baksheyev Dor
- Baranovo
- Barbolino
- Berezovaya Gora
- Berlikovo
- Bersenevo
- Bolshaya Chiryadka
- Bolshoye Barakovo
- Bolshoye Baykalovo
- Bolshoye Burtanovo
- Bolshoye Chekavino
- Bolshoye Khavino
- Bolshoye Lapino
- Bolshoye Lubozino
- Bolshoye Pozharovo
- Bolshoye Sirino
- Bolshoye Skretneye Ramenye
- Bryukhavitsa
- Burkovshchina
- Buryakovo
- Byakovo
- Cheshkovshchina
- Chupovo
- Chyornaya
- Danilovo
- Danilovskaya
- Demino
- Dolmatovo
- Dorozhkovo
- Fedyuninskaya
- Fominsky
- Gar
- Garazhi
- Goluzino
- Gora
- Gorbovo
- Gorka
- Gorodishche
- Gromozovo
- Isady
- Kalinino
- Karyug
- Kazarino
- Kholka
- Kichmenga
- Kichmengsky Gorodok
- Kirkino
- Klepikovo
- Klimovo
- Klyukino
- Knyazhigora
- Kobylkino
- Kobylsk
- Kolotovshchina
- Kondratovo
- Konets
- Konishchevo
- Kontiyevo
- Korkin Dor
- Koryakovskaya
- Koskovo
- Koskovo
- Kostylevo
- Kotelnovo
- Kradikhino
- Kradikhino
- Krasavino-2
- Krasnaya Gora
- Krasnoye Selo
- Krokhalevo
- Kryazh
- Kuftino
- Kuzmino
- Kuzminskaya
- Laptyug
- Laskino
- Lavrovo
- Leontyevshchina
- Leshukovshchina
- Lobanovo
- Lupachevo
- Lychenitsa
- Makarovo
- Malaya Chiryadka
- Malinovitsa
- Maloye Barakovo
- Maloye Lapino
- Maloye Pozharovo
- Maloye Ramenye
- Maloye Sirino
- Maly Dor
- Manshino
- Mariyevsky Vyselok
- Martynovo
- Matasovo
- Matino
- Maximovshchina
- Mikheyevo
- Mitenyova Gora
- Mokrushino
- Myakinnaya
- Myslikovo
- Nabolotnaya Gar
- Nadeyevshchina
- Nedubrovo
- Nekipelovo
- Niva
- Nizhneye Isakovo
- Nizhneye Nikitino
- Nizhneye Sergeyevo
- Nizhneye Vorovo
- Nizhny Yenangsk
- Nizhnyaya Lukina Gora
- Nizhnyaya Yentala
- Novaya Shilovshchina
- Novo-Georgiyevskoye
- Obakino
- Ogryzkovo
- Okinin Dor
- Okulovo
- Olenevo
- Olyatovo
- Olyushino
- Omut
- Osatovo-Ramenye
- Ovsyannikovo
- Paderino
- Pakhomovo
- Palutino
- Panovo
- Pavlovskaya
- Pelyaginets
- Petrakovo
- Petryanino
- Ploskaya
- Plostiyevo
- Podgorka
- Podgorye
- Podgorye
- Podgrivye
- Podlesovo
- Pogudino
- Polovishchensky
- Pomelovka
- Popovo
- Poryadnevshchina
- Priluk
- Prilukovo
- Pronino
- Puzovo
- Ramenye
- Reshetnikovo
- Rossoulinskaya
- Rudnikovo
- Ryabevo
- Ryabinovshchina
- Rybino
- Ryzhunikhino
- Samylovo
- Sarayevo
- Sarmas
- Savino
- Selishche
- Selivanovo
- Sementsev Dor
- Sergeyevo
- Sever
- Shartanovo
- Shatenevo
- Shchepelino
- Shelomets
- Shemyachkino
- Shestakovo
- Shilovo
- Shiryayevo
- Shonga
- Sigovo
- Sirino
- Sivtsevo
- Skoryukovo
- Sloboda
- Slobodka
- Smolyanka
- Solonikhino
- Sorokino
- Spirovskaya
- Spitsyno
- Staraya Shilovshchina
- Stepurino
- Sudnicheskaya Gora
- Sushniki
- Svetitsa
- Sychikha
- Taftinsky Navolok
- Tarasovo
- Tasherikha
- Tatarinovo
- Terekhino
- Titovshchina
- Tokarevo
- Toropovo
- Trubovshchina
- Trufanovo
- Ushakovo
- Ust-Syamzhenets
- Ustye Kharyuzovo
- Ustyenskaya
- Vaganovo
- Vasino
- Velikusha
- Verkhnesavinskaya
- Verkhneye Isakovo
- Verkhny Yenangsk
- Verkhnyaya Lukina Gora
- Verkhnyaya Yentala
- Volkovo
- Voronino
- Voroninskaya
- Vymol
- Vysokaya
- Yakshinskaya
- Yefimovo
- Yelovino
- Yemelyanov Dor
- Yermakova Gar
- Yugsky
- Zabolotny
- Zagarye
- Zakharovo
- Zamostovitsa
- Zarechye
- Zasorino
- Zasosenye
- Zavachug
- Zayuzhye
- Zharovikha
- Zhevnino
- Zhukovo
- Zvezda

== Kirillovsky District ==
Rural localities in Kirillovsky District:

- Argunovo
- Bolshoye Dityatevo
- Bolshoye Korovino
- Bolshoye Osanovo
- Bolshoye Zakozye
- Bragino
- Burakovo
- Chebunino
- Chevaksino
- Chirkovo
- Chishchino
- Dorogusha
- Dulovo
- Duravino
- Dyunevo
- Fedyayevo
- Ferapontovo
- Filimonovo
- Gromovo
- Gromukha
- Istominskaya
- Khmelevitsy
- Kishemskoye
- Klemushino
- Kochevino
- Kokovanovskaya
- Konyutino
- Koryakino
- Koshcheyevo
- Kukontsy
- Maly Dor
- Matveyevskoye
- Melekhovo
- Minchakovo
- Novodevichye
- Novshino
- Ostretsovo
- Paunino
- Pustyn
- Rogalevo
- Rozhevo
- Rukino
- Savinskoye
- Sazonovo
- Shchanikovo
- Shortino
- Sitkovo
- Sitskoye
- Skokovo
- Slavyanka
- Sobolevo
- Sopigino
- Starodevichye
- Strakhovo
- Tatyanino
- Terekhovskaya
- Tikhonovo
- Toloknyanitsa
- Ust-Sitskoye
- Vasilyevo
- Vymetnoye
- Zapan-Nova
- Zhilino

== Mezhdurechensky District ==
Rural localities in Mezhdurechensky District:

- Akulovskoye
- Alexandrovka
- Alexeyevo
- Artemyevo
- Bolshoye Makarovo
- Borshchevka
- Brunchakovo
- Bukino
- Dachnoye
- Dorovatka
- Dvinitsa
- Dyakonovo
- Egorye
- Fedoteyevo
- Frolovo
- Gavrilkovo
- Golubi
- Grekhnevka
- Igumnitsevo
- Ishkovo
- Ivankovo
- Kadasovo
- Kalitino
- Karpovo
- Karpovskoye
- Khozhayevo
- Kopylovo
- Kosmovo
- Kosovo
- Kotsyno
- Kozhukhovo
- Krapivino
- Krasotinka
- Kuzminskoye
- Lavrentyevo
- Lyskovo
- Makarovo
- Malaya Storona
- Maloye Makarovo
- Markovo
- Markvoskoye
- Matveytsevo
- Matyushkino
- Mikhalevo
- Motyri
- Mytnitsa
- Namestovo
- Nikolskoye
- Nizhny Pochinok
- Novaya
- Novosyolka
- Novoye
- Nozemskiye Isady
- Obroshino
- Odomtsyno
- Ognevo
- Olekhovo
- Ostretsovo
- Pankovo
- Parfenka
- Pazukhino
- Penyevo
- Peshkovo
- Pestikovo
- Petrishchevo
- Plemyannikovo
- Plyusnino
- Podbereznovo
- Podgornovo
- Podkurnovo
- Poplevino
- Popovskoye
- Pristan Isady
- Protasovo
- Pustoshnovo
- Razdolnaya
- Ropotovo
- Ryapalovo
- Sarantsyno
- Sbrodovo
- Selishcha
- Serednevo
- Shchipino
- Shchyolkovo
- Shetenevo
- Sheybukhta
- Shichenga
- Shikhmino
- Shikhovo
- Shingarskoye Isady
- Shonorovo
- Shuyskoye
- Slobodka
- Sovka
- Spas-Yamshchiki
- Staroye
- Stepanovskoye
- Svatilovo
- Svyatogorye
- Tupitsyno
- Turovets
- Turybanino
- Ushakovo
- Uvarovitsa
- Vaskino
- Voltash
- Vorobeytsevo
- Vragovo
- Vysokovo
- Yaskino
- Yekimovo
- Yershovo
- Yusovo
- Zarechye
- Zhidovinovo
- Zmeytsyno
- Znamenskoye

== Nikolsky District ==
Rural localities in Nikolsky District:

- Abaturovo
- Aksentyevo
- Argunovo
- Baydarovo
- Belyayevka
- Bludnovo
- Bogdanovka
- Bolshoy Dvor
- Bolshoye Fomino
- Bolshoye Oksilovo
- Bolshoye Sverchkovo
- Borok
- Brodovitsa
- Burakovo
- Butova Kurya
- Chegodayevsky
- Chelpanovo
- Chernino
- Cherntsovo
- Chushevino
- Chyornaya
- Demino
- Dor
- Dunilovo
- Dunilovsky
- Dvorishche
- Dyachkovo
- Filimonovy Gari
- Filinsky
- Filippovo
- Gagarin
- Gora
- Gorka-Kokuy
- Gorokhovsky
- Guzhovo
- Ilyinskoye
- Irdanovo
- Ivakovo
- Ivantets
- Kachug
- Kalauz
- Kalinino
- Kamennoye
- Kamenny
- Karnysh
- Kholshevikovo
- Kipshenga
- Klenovaya
- Knyazhevo
- Kolesov Log
- Konygino
- Korepino
- Koshelevo
- Kostenevo
- Kostylevo
- Kotelnoye
- Kovrigino
- Kovyrtsevo
- Kozhayevo
- Kozlovka
- Krasnaya Zvezda
- Krasnoye Zvedeniye
- Krivodeyevo
- Krivyatskoye
- Kudanga
- Kudangsky
- Kudrino
- Kumbiser
- Kurevino
- Kuznechikha
- Kuznetsovo
- Lantyug
- Lashovo
- Leunino
- Levkin
- Levoberezhny
- Lipovo
- Lisitsyno
- Lokha
- Lyulkovo
- Makarovsky
- Maloye Fomino
- Maloye Oksilovo
- Maloye Sverchkovo
- Malyye Gari
- Markovo
- Melentyevo
- Michkovo
- Milofanovo
- Mokretsevo
- Molodyozhny
- Myakishevo
- Nagavitsino
- Nigino
- Nizhny Rystyug
- Noskovo
- Nyunenga
- Orlovo
- Osinovaya Gar
- Osinovo
- Paderino
- Pakhomovo
- Panteleyevo
- Pavlovo
- Perebor
- Permas
- Permassky
- Pertyug
- Petryanino
- Petryayevo
- Pezhenga
- Pichug
- Plaksino
- Podgorye
- Podol
- Podolskaya
- Podosinovets
- Pogorelitsa
- Polezhayevo
- Polovina
- Polovinka
- Prudishnaya
- Putilovo
- Pyatakov
- Rameshki
- Rodyukino
- Rokunovo
- Samylovo
- Selivanovo
- Semenka
- Senino
- Serpovo
- Shalashnevo
- Sharzhenga
- Shiri
- Shirokaya
- Sinitsyno
- Skomoroshye
- Sluda
- Sofronovo
- Sokolovo
- Solotnovo
- Sorokino
- Starina
- Stepshinsky
- Storozhevaya
- Subornaya
- Svetly Klyuch
- Syrkovo
- Talitsa
- Tarasovo
- Telyanino
- Terebayevo
- Tokovitsa
- Travino
- Turino
- Upiralovo
- Uritskoye
- Vakhnevo
- Verkhny Rystyug
- Verkhnyaya Kema
- Verkhovino
- Vesyolaya Griva
- Vinograd
- Vladimirovo
- Vsemirskaya
- Vyrypayevo
- Vysokinsky
- Yamskaya
- Yelkhovetsky
- Yelkhovka
- Yeremkin
- Yermakovo
- Yesipovo
- Yushkovo
- Zavarikha
- Zavrazhye
- Zaymishche
- Zelentsovo
- Zelyonaya Griva
- Zemtsovo
- Zhivotovo

== Nyuksensky District ==
Rural localities in Nyuksensky District:

- Ananyevskaya
- Berezovaya Slobodka
- Berezovo
- Bobrovskoye
- Bolshaya Gorka
- Bolshaya Selmenga
- Bolshiye Ivki
- Bor
- Brusenets
- Brusnovolovsky Pogost
- Bryzgalovo
- Bykovo
- Dunay
- Dvorishche
- Fedkovskaya
- Gora
- Gorodishchna
- Igmas
- Ivanovskaya
- Karmanov Dvor
- Kazakovo
- Khokhlovo
- Kileynaya Vystavka
- Kirillovo
- Klimshino
- Kokshenskaya
- Kokuyevo
- Kopylovo
- Korolevskaya
- Kosmarevskaya Kuliga
- Kozlevskaya
- Kozlovo
- Krasavino
- Kuznetsovskaya
- Larinskaya
- Lesyutino
- Levash
- Lopatino
- Lukino
- Lyamenskaya
- Makarino
- Malaya Gorka
- Malaya Selmenga
- Malchevskaya
- Malye Ivki
- Martynovskaya
- Matveyevo
- Matveyevskaya
- Monastyrikha
- Mygra
- Nakvasino
- Nizhneye Kamennoye
- Nizhnyaya Gorka
- Nizovki
- Norovo
- Nyuksenitsa
- Oleshkovka
- Opalikhi
- Panfilikha
- Perkhushkovo
- Peski
- Poboishchnoye
- Prozhektor
- Pustynya
- Razulichye
- Sarafanovskaya
- Semenova Gora
- Shulgino
- Slekishino
- Sloboda
- Slobodka
- Sofronovskaya
- Sovetskaya
- Strelka
- Ustye-Gorodishchenskoye
- Veliky Dvor
- Verkhneye Kamennoye
- Verkhnyaya Gorka
- Verkhovye
- Vostroye
- Zaborye
- Zadny Dvor
- Zaglubotskaya
- Zarechye
- Zhar
- Zimnyak
- Zveglivets

== Sheksninsky District ==
Rural localities in Sheksninsky District:

- Afanasovo
- Alexeyevo
- Alferovo
- Andreykovo
- Andryushino
- Anisimovo
- Ankimarovo
- Antipino
- Aristovo
- Artemyevo
- Bekarevo
- Beloye
- Beregovoy
- Bereznik
- Biryuchevo
- Bolshaya Mushnya
- Bolshaya Stepanovskaya
- Bolshoy Ovinets
- Bolshoye Ivanovskoye
- Bolshoye Mitenino
- Bolshoye Pankino
- Boryatino
- Boyarovo
- Bratkovo
- Bratovets
- Bronnikovo
- Brykino
- Bugry
- Bulatovo
- Burakovo
- Bylino
- Chagino
- Charomskoye
- Cherneyevo
- Chetverikovo
- Churilovo
- Churovskoye
- Davydkovo
- Davydovo
- Demenskoye
- Demidovo
- Demino
- Demsino
- Deryagino
- Dobrets
- Domshino
- Dubki
- Dudkino
- Dumino
- Durasovo
- Dyakonitsa
- Dyakonovskoye
- Fedorovo
- Fedotovo
- Filyakovo
- Florida
- Fonino
- Gavrilovo
- Gerasimovo
- Globena
- Glupovskoye
- Glyadkovo
- Gologuzka
- Gorodskoye
- Gorokhovskoye
- Gramotino
- Grigoryevskoye
- Gubino
- Gushchino
- Gvozdevo
- Ignatovskoye
- Igumnovo
- Irma
- Ivankovo
- Kalikino
- Kameshnik
- Kameshnitsa
- Kapustino
- Katayevo
- Kelbuy
- Khanevo
- Khodyrevo
- Khoroshevo
- Kichino
- Kirgody
- Kiselevo
- Knyazhe
- Kochino
- Koluberevo
- Komarovo
- Konshevo
- Koposikha
- Kopylovo
- Korotkovo
- Koryakino
- Koshcheyevo
- Kostinskoye
- Kotovo
- Kovshovo
- Kozhevnikovo
- Krasnoye
- Krasny Kholm
- Krenevo
- Kukino
- Kulpino
- Kurovo
- Kurya
- Kuryakovo
- Kvasyunino
- Larionovo
- Leonovo
- Leushkino
- Levinskaya
- Lgovo
- Loginovo
- Lukinki
- Lupanda
- Lyskovo
- Lyubomirovo
- Lyutchik
- Machevo
- Makaryino
- Malaya Mushnya
- Malinukha
- Maloye Pankino
- Maly Ovinets
- Malyino
- Matveyevskoye
- Maurino
- Maximkovo
- Maximovskoye
- Medvezhye
- Mikhaylovskoye
- Mineyka
- Mironkovo
- Mititsyno
- Mitkino
- Mitrokhovo
- Molodishchevo
- Molodki
- Mys
- Myshkino
- Nazarovo
- Nefedkovo
- Nesterovo
- Nikolskoye
- Nizhny Dor
- Nizhnyaya Gorka
- Nizkiye
- Nokshino
- Norovka
- Novo
- Novoselki
- Obukhovo
- Osyutino
- Pacha
- Pakhomovo
- Panfilovo
- Pankino
- Papushino
- Pashnets
- Pavlikovo
- Pavlovskoye
- Pegusha
- Perkhino
- Pervino
- Pleshchakovo
- Poddubye
- Podgorny
- Podolets
- Polezhayevo
- Polyana
- Potanino
- Pozdeyevo
- Progress
- Prokino
- Pryadino
- Pustoshka
- Pyryayevo
- Pyzheyevo
- Ramenye
- Razbuy
- Rebyachyevo
- Rechnaya Sosnovka
- Roitsa
- Romannikovo
- Roshcha
- Rusanovo
- Rylovo
- Rzhanitsyno
- Saunino
- Seletskaya
- Seltsa
- Semkino
- Shapkino
- Shelomovo
- Shelukhino
- Shigoyevo
- Shipitsyno
- Skorynino
- Slavyanka
- Slizovo
- Sobolevo
- Sobolino
- Sokolye
- Sologost
- Solovarka
- Spitsy
- Starovo
- Staroye Selo
- Sukholomovo
- Suslovskoye
- Svatkovo
- Svetilovo
- Syamichi
- Syromyatkino
- Sızma
- Tarkanovo
- Telibanovo
- Timshino
- Tirkovo
- Tochka
- Troshino
- Turtsevo
- Tyapino
- Uloshkovo
- Ustyanovo
- Uvarovo
- Vakarino
- Vaneyevo
- Vasilyevo
- Vasilyevskoye
- Vaskovo
- Velikoye
- Velyushevo
- Verkhny Dor
- Vinogradovo
- Volkovo
- Vorkop
- Vorontsovo
- Voterka
- Yakunina Gora
- Yedoma
- Yefimovo
- Yekimovskoye
- Yeremino
- Yershovo
- Yurochkino
- Zadnyaya
- Zaozerye
- Zarechnoye
- Zhabino
- Zhayno
- Zolotukha
- Zverinets
- Zytsovo

== Sokolsky District ==
Rural localities in Sokolsky District:

- Agafonovo
- Alekino
- Aleksino
- Alexeyevo
- Alferovskoye
- Andreyevskoye
- Andronovo
- Antufyevo
- Arkhangelskoye
- Bakulino
- Barskoye
- Beketovo
- Bekrenevo
- Berezino
- Berezov Pochinok
- Berkovo
- Bessolovo
- Bilnovo
- Biryakovo
- Bolshiye Ivanovskiye
- Bolshiye Ozerki
- Bolshoy Krivets
- Bolshoye Petrakovo
- Bolshoye Yakovkovo
- Boriskovo
- Borisovo
- Borshchevo
- Borshchovka
- Boyarskoye
- Bratskoye
- Bryukhovo
- Burtsevo
- Chekshino
- Chepurovo
- Chuchkovo
- Derevenka
- Dmitrikovo
- Dyakovo
- Dyurbenikha
- Fedyayevo
- Fefilovo
- Filyayevo
- Frolovo
- Georgiyevskoye
- Gerasimovo
- Gladkino
- Glebovo
- Golodeyevo
- Gololitsyno
- Gorbovo
- Gribanovo
- Gribtsovo
- Guriyevo
- Istominskoye
- Ivanikha
- Ivankovo
- Ivanovo
- Ivkovo
- Kachalka
- Kalinovo
- Kalitino
- Kamskoye
- Kapustino
- Karpovskoye
- Kazarinovo
- Kazarnoye
- Kaznakuryevo
- Khaminovo
- Kharlushino
- Klokovo
- Knyazhevo
- Kolotovye
- Komarovo
- Konanikha
- Konanovo
- Koposikha
- Kopylovo
- Korino
- Korzha
- Kotlaksa
- Kozhukovo
- Kozlovo
- Krinkino
- Kromovesovo
- Kulseyevo
- Kurya
- Kuvayevo
- Kuvshinovo
- Kuzminskoye
- Lebechikha
- Lendobovo
- Levkovo
- Lipovitsa
- Litega
- Lodeyshchik
- Loginovo
- Lubodino
- Malakhovo
- Malaya Murga
- Maloye Petrakovo
- Maloye Zalesye
- Maly Krivets
- Malye Goritsy
- Malye Ivanovskiye
- Malye Ozerki
- Mamonkino
- Marfinskoye
- Markovskoye
- Medvedkovo
- Melenka
- Melino
- Mikheyevo
- Mishutkino
- Mortkino
- Morzhenga
- Myalitsyno
- Nadeyevo
- Naliskoye
- Naumovskoye
- Navalkino
- Nekrasovo
- Nelidovo
- Nesterovo
- Nikolskaya
- Nikolskoye
- Nikulinskoye
- Novy
- Obrosovo
- Ogarovo
- Okulikha
- Okulovskoye
- Olarevo
- Opalevo
- Osanovo
- Osipikha
- Osipovo
- Ostrilovo
- Ovsyannikovo
- Ozerko
- Pakhino
- Pakhtalka
- Panyutino
- Pashenino
- Pashikovo
- Pepelnikovo
- Perevoz
- Perkhurovo
- Petrovskoye
- Petryayevo
- Pirogovo
- Plishkino
- Podolnoye
- Podyelnoye
- Pogost Ilyinsky
- Popovo
- Preobrazhenskoye
- Prisedkino
- Prokopovo
- Prokshino
- Prudovka
- Pustoshka
- Pyatino
- Pykhmarevo
- Repnoye
- Rodionovo
- Rodyukino
- Rogozkino
- Rostovka
- Ryazanka
- Rykulya
- Rylovo
- Savkino
- Selishche
- Seltso
- Semakino
- Semenkovo
- Semenovo
- Senino
- Shachino
- Shadrino
- Shastovo
- Shastovo-Zabereznoye
- Shchekotovo
- Shchurikha
- Shera
- Shiblovka
- Shipunovo
- Shishkino
- Shitrobovo
- Shulepovo
- Sidorkovo
- Skomorokhovo
- Sloboda
- Slobodishchevo
- Sonikha
- Sosnovaya Roshcha
- Sosnovets
- Spitsyno
- Staroye
- Stepanovo
- Sudoverf
- Sverchkovo
- Tataurov Pochinok
- Telyachye
- Tenkovo
- Timoninskoye
- Titovskoye
- Tokhmarevo
- Tolstoumovo
- Treparevo
- Trukhinka
- Tupitsyno
- Turbayevo
- Tureyevo
- Turovo
- Tyrykovo
- Ugol
- Ugolskoye
- Varushino
- Vasilevo
- Vasilyevskoye
- Vaskovo
- Vasyutino
- Veretye
- Verkhnyaya Storona
- Vitoryevo
- Vlasovo
- Voksino
- Vorobyovo
- Vyazovoye
- Vysokaya
- Yadrovo
- Yakovlevo
- Yertebino
- Yesipovo
- Zabereznichye
- Zabolotka
- Zadneye
- Zakharovo
- Zakurskoye
- Zaledeyevo
- Zalesye
- Zamoshye
- Zavrazhye
- Zhikharevo
- Zhilino
- Zuyevo

== Syamzhensky District ==
Rural localities in Syamzhensky District:

- Alexeyevskaya
- Alferovskaya
- Anikovskaya
- Arganovo
- Artyomovskaya
- Averinskaya
- Babino
- Baranikha
- Borisovskaya
- Borok-1
- Borok-2
- Burdukovo
- Burnikha
- Chaglotovo
- Chertikha
- Chirkovskaya
- Chizhovo
- Davydkovo
- Davydovskaya
- Demidovskaya
- Druzhba
- Fedosikha
- Frolikha
- Georgiyevskaya
- Gerasimikha
- Goluzino
- Gremyachy
- Gridino
- Ignashevskaya
- Ikonnikovo
- Istominskaya
- Ivanovskaya
- Kharitonovskaya
- Kladovitsa
- Klepikovskaya
- Klimushino
- Klokovo
- Kocherzhikha
- Kolbinskaya
- Koltyrikha
- Kononovskaya
- Kopylovo
- Korostelevo
- Kubinskaya
- Kuryanovskaya
- Kuzminskaya
- Lelekovskaya
- Levinskaya
- Lukinskaya
- Lyubovitsa
- Malinnik
- Markovo
- Markovskaya
- Martyanikha
- Maryinskaya
- Mininskaya
- Mirny
- Mokrovo
- Monastyrskaya
- Myakotikha
- Nesterikha
- Nikolskoye
- Nikulinskaya
- Noginskaya
- Novaya Sluda
- Olekhovskaya
- Orlovskaya
- Peshkovskaya
- Pestino
- Pigilinskaya
- Piligino
- Pirogovo
- Podlesnaya
- Pogorelets
- Pogrebnoye
- Poluyanikha
- Ponomarikha
- Prozhektor
- Puronga
- Putkovo
- Ramenye
- Rassokhino
- Rechkovskaya
- Rogovitsynskaya
- Rubtsovo
- Samsonovskaya
- Savinskaya
- Semenikha
- Shestakovskaya
- Shirega
- Shishakovo
- Shoksha
- Shubachevo
- Sidorovo
- Sobolikha
- Srednyaya Sluda
- Staraya
- Syamzha
- Trubakovo
- Trusikha
- Ushakovskaya
- Ust-Reka
- Uzmitsa
- Vakhrushevskaya
- Veliky Dvor
- Volkhovskaya
- Voronovo
- Vydrikha
- Vysokovo
- Yakovlevskaya
- Yarygino
- Yermakovskaya
- Yeskino
- Yevsyutino
- Yezdunya
- Yukovskaya
- Zakharovskaya
- Zakostimye
- Zalesye
- Zaytsevo
- Zhar
- Zhityovo

== Tarnogsky District ==
Rural localities in Tarnogsky District:

- Abbakumovskaya
- Afonovskaya
- Agapitovskaya
- Aksyutinskaya
- Akulovskaya
- Ananikha
- Ananyevskaya
- Anikin Pochinok
- Anosovskaya
- Antropikha
- Antusheva Gora
- Ayga
- Bakrylovo
- Baranskaya
- Baryshevskaya
- Bashevskaya
- Belyayevskaya
- Bereznik
- Bobrovitsa
- Bolshaya Semyonovskaya
- Bolshaya Verkhotina
- Bolshoy Gorokh
- Borisovskaya
- Borok
- Boyarskaya
- Braginskaya
- Budrinskaya
- Budrinskaya-1
- Burmasovo
- Burtsevskaya
- Chalovskaya
- Chasovnoye
- Cherepanikha
- Cherniyevo
- Chernyakovo
- Chernyatinskaya
- Chernyshovo
- Chobotovo
- Churilovka
- Danilov Pochinok
- Davydikha
- Davydovskaya
- Dementyevskaya
- Demidovskaya
- Denisovskaya
- Deshevikha
- Desyatina
- Dmitriyevskaya
- Dor
- Doroninskaya
- Durnevskaya
- Fatyanovo
- Fednevskaya
- Fedorovskaya
- Feofilatovskaya
- Filimonovskaya
- Filyakovo
- Gagarikha
- Galitskaya
- Gavrilovskaya
- Gavshino
- Golchevskaya
- Golebatovo
- Gorka-2
- Goryayevskaya
- Gribovskaya
- Grigoryevskaya
- Gusikha
- Ignatikha
- Ignatovskaya
- Igumnovskaya
- Ikhomovo
- Ilezsky Pogost
- Ilyinskaya
- Ilyukhinskaya
- Isachkovo
- Isainskaya
- Isakovskaya
- Ivanovskaya
- Kalininskoye
- Kamchuga
- Kamchuga
- Kameshkurye
- Kanskoye
- Kapelino
- Kaplinskaya
- Karchevskaya
- Karelinskaya-2
- Karitsa
- Karpovskaya
- Kashinskoye
- Katerinino
- Kharitonovskaya
- Kholkin Konets
- Khom
- Kichiginskaya
- Kirivanovskaya
- Kiyanskaya
- Klenovaya
- Klevtsovskaya
- Klimovo
- Klyzhovo
- Knyazhaya
- Knyazhikha
- Kobylye
- Kochenga
- Kokorikha
- Komaritsa
- Kondratyevskaya
- Kon-Gora
- Kontorka
- Kontsevskaya
- Konyukhovskaya
- Korchazhinskaya
- Kormakino
- Korolikha
- Korotkovskaya
- Kostaikha
- Kovrizhinskaya
- Kozhevnikovskaya
- Kozhinskaya
- Krasnoye
- Krasny Bor
- Kremlevo
- Kriulya
- Krivosheinskaya
- Krotovskaya
- Krutaya Osyp
- Kurevino
- Kurkovskaya
- Kuryanikha
- Kuznecheyevskaya
- Kvashninskaya
- Lavy
- Lesnikovo
- Levinskoye
- Lodygino
- Lomovo
- Lukinskaya
- Lyapinskaya
- Lychnaya
- Lyginskaya
- Lyubavchikha
- Makaryino
- Maklinskaya
- Malakhovsky Bor
- Malaya Gora
- Malaya Popovskaya
- Malaya Semyonovskaya
- Malaya Verkhotina
- Malchevskaya
- Maloye Voronino
- Manylovitsa
- Manylovo
- Manylovsky Pogost
- Manyukovskaya
- Marachevskaya
- Martyanovskaya
- Maslikha
- Matveyevskaya
- Maurnikovskaya
- Maximovskaya
- Meleshovo
- Mesto Alexandrovo
- Mikhaylovka
- Mikhaylovskaya
- Mikheyevskaya
- Milogorskaya
- Mishukovo
- Mitinskaya
- Nefedikha
- Nefedovskaya
- Nefedyevo
- Neklyudikha
- Nelyubino
- Nesterikha
- Nikiforovskaya
- Nikitikha
- Nikitin Pochinok
- Nikolayevskaya
- Nikonovskaya
- Nizhnepauninskaya
- Nizhnyaya Pechenga
- Novgorodskaya
- Okatovskaya
- Okulovskaya
- Olikhovskaya
- Osilkovo
- Osovaya
- Ostankovo
- Ostashevskaya
- Ovsyannikovskaya
- Ozhiginskaya
- Pakhotino
- Pakhtusovo
- Pakutino
- Palkinskaya
- Panikha
- Par
- Patrakeyevskaya
- Pavlomatveyevskaya
- Pershinskaya
- Pershinskaya-1
- Pershinskaya-2
- Petrilovo
- Petrishcheva Gora
- Petryayevskaya
- Ploshilovskaya
- Podlipnoye
- Pogonyayevskaya
- Pogoreltsevo
- Pogost Luka
- Pogost
- Pomazikha
- Pominovskaya
- Porokhovo
- Pospelovskaya
- Posyolok Myasokombinata
- Potepalovo
- Pritykino
- Prokopyevskaya
- Pronevskaya
- Puzovka
- Pyatovskaya
- Radchino
- Ramenye
- Regishevskaya
- Rodnaya
- Romashevsky Pogost
- Rudino
- Rudnovskaya
- Ryazanka
- Rykalovskaya
- Rylkovskaya
- Samsonovskaya
- Savinskaya
- Semenovskaya
- Semerninskoye
- Semichayevskaya
- Senskaya
- Senyukovskaya
- Seredskaya
- Sergeyevskoye
- Sergiyevskaya
- Shelkovo
- Shelovskaya
- Shershukovskaya
- Shkulevskaya
- Shulevo
- Sinyakovo
- Sinyakovskaya
- Skoryatenskoye
- Slastnichikha
- Slobodinskaya
- Slobodka
- Sluda
- Sludka
- Smetanino
- Snezhurovo
- Spassky Pogost
- Spichenskaya
- Srodino
- Stafilovo
- Stary Dvor
- Stepushino
- Strukovo
- Sukhaya Veret
- Surovchikha
- Surovtsovo
- Sverchkovskaya
- Sverdlovskaya
- Tabory
- Tarasovskaya
- Tarnogsky Gorodok
- Tekstilshchiki
- Telpino
- Tikhonikha
- Timoshinskaya
- Tiunovskaya
- Toporikha
- Toropovskaya
- Tryznovo
- Tsaryova
- Tselkovskaya
- Tsybuninskaya
- Tyrlyninskaya
- Tyuprikha
- Tyurdinskaya
- Uglitskaya
- Ugryumovskaya
- Ukhtanga
- Ulyanovskaya
- Uspenye
- Ust-Tsareva
- Ust-Yedenga
- Uvarovskaya
- Vanevskaya
- Varnitsy
- Vasyutkino
- Vaulovo
- Velikaya
- Verigino
- Verkhnepauninskaya
- Verkhovny Pogost
- Vershininskaya
- Vidernikovskaya
- Volodinskaya
- Vorlygino
- Voroninskaya
- Vorotishna
- Voshchar
- Vyazutinskaya
- Vydrino
- Yafanovskaya
- Yakinskaya
- Yakunikha
- Yakurino
- Yakushevskaya
- Yarinskaya
- Yarygino
- Yedovinskaya
- Yefimovskaya
- Yekimikha
- Yelifanovskaya Vystavka
- Yelifanovskaya
- Yeltsino
- Yemelyanovskaya
- Yerino
- Yermakovskaya
- Yermolinskaya
- Yermolitsa
- Yevseyevskaya
- Yezovo
- Yugra
- Yurenino
- Zapolnaya
- Zubarevo
- Zuikha
- Zykov Konets

== Totemsky District ==
Rural localities in Totemsky District:

- Antushevo
- Berezhok
- Bor
- Bykovo
- Cherepanikha
- Chernyakovo
- Davydkovo
- Dor
- Dyagilevo
- Fedotovo
- Filino
- Fominskaya
- Fominskoye
- Frolovo
- Glubokoye
- Gremyachy
- Ignachevo
- Ivakino
- Ivanovskaya
- Klimovskaya
- Korovinskaya
- Kotelnoye
- Kozlovka
- Krasnoye
- Kudrinskaya
- Kuzemkino
- Lenino
- Levash
- Lobanikha
- Luchkino
- Lukinskaya
- Martynovskaya
- Matveyevo
- Medvedevo
- Molokovo
- Mys
- Nikitinskaya
- Nikolskoye
- Oktyabrsky
- Panovo
- Pavlovskaya
- Pelevikha
- Pervomaysky
- Petukhovo
- Pogorelovo
- Popovskaya
- Pustosh
- Pyatovskaya
- Savino
- Semenkovo
- Semyonovskaya
- Sergeyevo
- Shulgino
- Sloboda
- Sluda
- Sokolovo
- Sovetsky
- Svetitsa
- Ustye
- Voronino
- Yartsevo
- Yubileyny
- Zadnyaya
- Zhilino

== Ust-Kubinsky District ==
Rural localities in Ust-Kubinsky District:

- Afanasovskaya
- Alyunenskaya
- Ananyino
- Andreyevskaya
- Antsiferovskaya
- Aristovo
- Avdeyevo
- Berezhnoye
- Bogorodskoye
- Bogoslovo
- Boriskovo
- Burdukovo
- Chirkovo
- Davydovskaya
- Dor
- Fedorkovo
- Fedorovskaya
- Feninskaya
- Filenskoye
- Filisovo
- Goleninskaya
- Gora
- Grizino
- Ivanovskaya
- Karpovskoye
- Konanovo
- Kostinskaya
- Krylovo
- Kryukovo
- Kulakovo
- Kurkinskaya
- Kuzminskoye
- Lyskovskaya
- Maloye Lyskarevo
- Maslovo
- Mitenskoye
- Nikiforovskaya
- Nikola-Koren
- Nikolskoye
- Pavlovskoye
- Perkhuryevo
- Ploskovo
- Plyushchevo
- Podgorye
- Pogost Trifon
- Popovka
- Rodionovo
- Ryazanovo
- Semenovskoye
- Shabarovo
- Shadrino
- Shambovo
- Shikhovo
- Shpilikha
- Sidorovskaya
- Sidorovskoye
- Staroye
- Sverchkovo
- Syanino
- Tavlash
- Tulpanovo
- Ugol
- Ustye
- Vecheslovo
- Vlasyevo
- Volosovo
- Voronino
- Voronovo
- Vysokoye
- Yelizarovo
- Yukovo
- Zadneye
- Zaluzhye
- Zhdanovskaya

== Ustyuzhensky District ==
Rural localities in Ustyuzhensky District:

- Alekino
- Alexandrovo
- Alexandrovo-Maryino
- Alexeyevo
- Anashkino
- Andrakovo
- Antonovo
- Astashkino
- Balakhtimerovo
- Bernyakovo
- Boguslavl
- Bolshaya Lipenka
- Bolshoye Pomyasovo
- Bolshoye Vosnoye
- Borodino
- Borovinka
- Brenchikha
- Brilino
- Bronino
- Bugry
- Byvaltsevo
- Chesavino
- Chirets
- Chuprovo
- Chyornaya
- Danilovskoye
- Degtyarnya
- Dementyevo
- Demtsyno
- Denisovo
- Derevyaga
- Dolotskoye
- Dora
- Dorino
- Dubrovka
- Dyagilevo
- Fedorovskoye
- Ganki
- Gliny
- Glukhovo-1
- Glukhovo-2
- Gora
- Gorodok
- Gromoshikha
- Gryada
- Gryaznaya Dubrova
- Igumnovo
- Isakovo
- Ivanovskoye
- Izbishchi
- Khripelevo
- Kishkino
- Kononovo
- Konyukhovo
- Kormovesovo
- Korokolets
- Kortikha
- Kostyanovo
- Kotovo
- Kozlovo
- Krasino
- Kresttsy
- Kresty
- Krotyn
- Kruglitsy
- Krutets
- Kstovo
- Kurevanikha
- Kuzemino
- Kvashnino
- Legalovo
- Lentyevo
- Leushino
- Loginovo
- Lukhnevo
- Lukyantsevo
- Lychno
- Lyubotovo
- Malaya Dubrovochka
- Maloye Medvedevo
- Maloye Vosnoye
- Marfino
- Martynovo
- Matveyevo
- Maximovskoye
- Melechino
- Meryozha
- Mezga
- Mikhalyovo
- Mikhaylovskoye
- Mochala
- Modno
- Myza-Testovo
- Nikiforovo
- Nikola
- Novaya
- Novinki
- Novoye Ivantsevo
- Obukhovo
- Ogib
- Okulovo
- Oryol
- Osinovik
- Osnopolye
- Pergovishchi
- Perya
- Petrovo
- Plotichye
- Poddubye
- Podolskoye
- Ponizovye
- Popchikha
- Popovka
- Poroslovo
- Posyolok imeni Zhelyabova
- Pozharki
- Pozharovo
- Rastoropovo
- Remennikovo
- Rodishkino
- Romankovo
- Rozhnyovo
- Samoylovo
- Samsonovo
- Savino
- Selishche
- Seltso
- Shaloch
- Shelokhach
- Shubotovo
- Shuklino
- Shustovo
- Sidorovo
- Skoblevo
- Slavynevo
- Sludy
- Sobolevo
- Sofrontsevo
- Solnechny
- Solovtsovo
- Soshnevo
- Spasskoye
- Starorechye
- Staroye Kvasovo
- Staroye Maloye
- Stepachyovo
- Svistuny
- Sychevo
- Sysoyevo
- Temyanikovo
- Timofeyevskoye
- Timonino
- Torsheyevo
- Trestenka
- Tsampelovo
- Tyukhtovo
- Vanskoye
- Varlygino
- Venitsy
- Vetrennikovo
- Volosovo
- Voronino
- Voronovo
- Vorontsy
- Vorotishino
- Vozgrikha
- Vypolzovo
- Vysotino
- Yakovlevskoye
- Yemelyanikha
- Yubileyny
- Zagorye
- Zakharovskoye
- Zalesye
- Zavrazhye
- Zaytsevo
- Zhilino
- Zhukovo
- Zimnik
- Zvana
- Zyablikovo
- Zykovo

== Vashkinsky District ==
Rural localities in Vashkinsky District:

- Aksentyevo
- Aleshino
- Alferovskaya
- Andreyevskaya
- Anikovo
- Anshevskaya
- Antropovo
- Averino
- Bereg
- Bereznik
- Bolshaya Chagotma
- Bolshoy Dvor
- Bonga
- Borisovo
- Bosovo
- Chertezh
- Chesnokovo
- Chisti
- Dankino
- Danshin Ruchey
- Davydovo
- Demidovo
- Deryagino
- Domantovo
- Dryabloye
- Dudrovo
- Durasovo
- Filippovo
- Gavrilovo
- Gavrilovo-2
- Glukharevo
- Gora (Andreyevskoye Rural Settlement)
- Gora (Vasilyevskoye Rural Settlement)
- Ikonnikovo
- Istomino
- Ivanovskaya
- Iyevlevo
- Kalitino
- Kharbovo
- Kiuy
- Konechnaya
- Kononovo
- Koptevo
- Korovino
- Kostino
- Kuznechikha
- Levino
- Levinskaya
- Lipin Bor
- Loginovo
- Lukyanovo
- Lunevo
- Lyapino
- Malaya Chagotma
- Maleyevo
- Maleyevo
- Mankovo
- Markovo
- Matveyeva Gora
- Matveyevskaya
- Mitrofanovo
- Monastyrskaya
- Moseyevo
- Moskvino
- Myakishevo
- Myanda
- Mys (Roksomskoye Rural Settlement)
- Mys (Vasilyevskoye Rural Settlement)
- Mytchikovo
- Mytnik
- Nasonovo
- Naumovo
- Nefedovo
- Nesterevo
- Nikolskaya
- Nikolskoye
- Nikonovo
- Nizhneye Khotino
- Novets
- Novokemsky
- Novoselo
- Oktyabrsky
- Ostaninskaya
- Ostrov
- Parfyonovo
- Pavlovo
- Pereyezd
- Pervomaysky
- Petukhovo
- Piksimovo
- Pinshino
- Podgornaya
- Podgorskaya
- Pokrovskoye
- Popovka Munskaya
- Popovka
- Popovka-Pushtorskaya
- Popovka-Volotskaya
- Potashevo
- Potetyuyevo
- Pozdino
- Prokino
- Rechevo
- Rogalevo
- Rostani
- Ryzhikovo
- Salnikovo
- Sapogovo
- Savalikha
- Semenchevo
- Semyanovskaya
- Semyonovskaya
- Shchukino
- Shugino
- Sidorovo
- Skokovo
- Sofronovo
- Srednyaya
- Stanovaya
- Sukhoyezhino
- Tarasyevo
- Timino (Andreyevskoye Rural Settlement)
- Timino (Roksomskoye Rural Settlement)
- Timoshino
- Trifanovo
- Troitskoye
- Troshino
- Turzino
- Tushnaya Gora
- Uglovaya
- Ukhtoma
- Ushakovo (Ivanovsky Selsoviet)
- Ushakovo (Piksimovsky Selsoviet)
- Ustye
- Vashki
- Vasilyevo
- Vasilyevskaya
- Vasyukovo
- Vasyutino
- Veliky Dvor
- Verkhneye Khotino
- Vesnino
- Vesyolaya
- Volkovo
- Vyushino
- Yakunino
- Yekimovo
- Yeskino
- Zadnyaya
- Zarechny
- Zdykhalno
- Zuyevo

== Velikoustyugsky District ==
Rural localities in Velikoustyugsky District:

- Afurino
- Aksenovo
- Aksenovsky Pochinok
- Alexeyevskaya
- Andronovo
- Anokhinskoye
- Antonovo
- Antsiferovo
- Antushevo
- Aristovo
- Arkhangelskaya Melnitsa
- Bakharevo
- Baranovo
- Barsukovo
- Bayushevskaya
- Belaya
- Belozerovo
- Belozerovo (Rural Settlement)
- Bereznikovo
- Berezovka
- Berezovo
- Birichevo
- Birichevo (Pokrovskoye Rural Settlement)
- Birichevo (Ust-Alexeyevskoye Rural Settlement)
- Blagoveshchenye
- Bobrovnikovo
- Bobykino
- Bolshaya Sinega
- Bolshaya Sloboda
- Bolshiye Slobody
- Bolshoy Dvor
- Bolshoye Chebayevo
- Bolshoye Kalikino
- Bolshoye Voroshnino
- Bolshoye Vostroye
- Bolshoye Yamkino
- Bolshoye Yesiplevo
- Bor
- Borovinka
- Budrino
- Bukhinino
- Bukovo
- Burlevo
- Bushkovo
- Buslayevo
- Bykovo
- Chernakovo
- Chernevo
- Chernyatino
- Chernyshevo
- Chuchery
- Chyornaya
- Davydovskoye
- Demidovo
- Demyanovo
- Derevenka (Parfyonovskoye)
- Derevenka (Teplogorskoye)
- Dernovo
- Dudino
- Energetik
- Falaleyevo
- Fominskaya
- Fyodorovskaya
- Fyodorovskoye
- Galkino
- Gavrino
- Gerasimovo
- Glyadkovo
- Goltsovo
- Gora
- Gorbachevo
- Gorbishchevo
- Gorka (Krasavinskoye Rural Settlement)
- Gorka (Yudinskoye Rural Settlement)
- Gorka-Managorskaya
- Goryayevo
- Gribino
- Grigoryevskoye
- Grishino
- Gruznishchevo
- Ilatovskaya
- Ilyinskoye
- Isakovo
- Ishutino
- Istok
- Ivashevo
- Ivernevo
- Izmarukhovo
- Izoninskaya
- Kalashovo
- Kalikino
- Kalinino
- Karasovo
- Kasyanka
- Khimzavod
- Khorkhorino
- Kichuga
- Klepikovo
- Klimlevo
- Klimovo
- Kochurino
- Kolpakovo
- Konanovo
- Konkovo
- Konshevo
- Kopylovo
- Korobeynikovo
- Korobovo
- Korobovskoye
- Korolyovo (Krasavino Rural Settlement)
- Korolyovo (Pokrovskoye Rural Settlement)
- Koshovo
- Krasavino
- Krasnoye Pole
- Kremenye
- Krivaya Beryoza
- Kulakovo
- Kulnevo
- Kupriyanovo
- Kurakino
- Kurdenga
- Kushalovo
- Kuzminskaya Vystavka
- Kuzminskoye
- Kuznetsovo
- Lenivitsa
- Leonovo
- Lodeyka
- Loginovskaya
- Lomovatka
- Lopatnikovo
- Malaya Gorka
- Malinniki
- Malinovo
- Maloye Chebayevo
- Marilovo
- Martishchevo
- Martynovo
- Medenitsyno
- Medvedki
- Medvezhy Vzvoz
- Mikhaylovskaya
- Mikhninskaya
- Minino
- Mitikhino
- Morozovitsa
- Moseyev Pochinok
- Moskvin Pochinok
- Murdinskaya
- Musino
- Myakalskaya Sloboda
- Myakinnitsyno
- Navolok
- Nemonovo
- Nikulino (Opokskoye Rural Settlement)
- Nikulino (Yudinskoye Rural Settlement)
- Nizhneye Anisimovo
- Nizhneye Gribtsovo
- Nizhneye Pankratovo
- Nizhneye Priluk
- Nizhnyaya Kichuga
- Nokshino
- Novator
- Novaya Derevnya
- Novosyolovo (Nizhneshardengskoye Rural Settlement)
- Novosyolovo (Pokrovskoye Rural Settlement)
- Novoye Rozhkovo
- Novoye Selo
- Obradovo
- Odomchino
- Ogoryltsevo
- Olennikovo
- Onbovo
- Opalipsovo
- Orlovo
- Palema
- Pantusovo
- Parfyonovo
- Parfyonovskaya Vystavka
- Parshino (Orlovskoye Rural Settlement)
- Parshino (Shemogodskoye Rural Settlement)
- Pavlovo
- Pavlovskoye
- Paykino
- Peganovo
- Penye
- Peremilovo
- Pervomayskoye
- Pestovo (Nizhneshardengsky Selsoviet)
- Pestovo (Teplogorsky Selsoviet)
- Pestovo (Tregubovsky Selsoviet)
- Petrovskaya
- Pikhtovo
- Pleso
- Podberezye
- Podborye
- Podgorye
- Podsosenye
- Podugorye
- Podvalye
- Podvolochye
- Podvorskiye
- Pogorelovo
- Poldarsa
- Poldarsa
- Polutino
- Polutovo
- Popovkino
- Popovskoye
- Porog
- Pozharishche
- Pozharovo
- Priluki (settlement)
- Priluki (village)
- Prislon
- Pupyshevo
- Pushkarikha
- Rodionovitsa
- Rogozinino
- Rovdino
- Rozhkovo
- Rukavishnikovo
- Ruposovo
- Sakovo
- Savino
- Selivanovo
- Semennikovo
- Severny
- Shastovo
- Shatrovo
- Shchekino
- Shilenga
- Skornyakovo
- Skorodum
- Skoryatino
- Slinkino
- Slizovitsa
- Slobodka (Parfenovsky Selsoviet)
- Slobodka (Veliky Ustyug)
- Sludka
- Smolinskaya Vystavka
- Sokolovo
- Solovyovo
- Sotnikovo
- Starina
- Starkovo
- Striga
- Stryukovo
- Studyonoye
- Sukhonsky
- Sulinskaya
- Susolovka
- Syvorotkino
- Teltevo
- Telyachye
- Teplogorye
- Tomashevo
- Udachino
- Ugol
- Ulyanitsa
- Urzhumovo
- Ust-Alexeyevo
- Ustye Povalikhino
- Utkino
- Valga
- Vargalovo
- Varzhenskaya Zaimka
- Vasilyevo
- Vasilyevskoye
- Veprevo
- Verkhneye Anisimovo
- Verkhneye Borodkino
- Verkhneye Gribtsovo
- Verkhneye Pankratovo
- Verkhneye Yakutino
- Verkhny Zayemkuch
- Verkhnyaya Kichuga
- Verkhnyaya Shardenga
- Vlasovo (Nizhneshardengskoye Rural Settlement)
- Vlasovo (Samotovinskoye Rural Settlement)
- Voronino
- Vozdvizhenye
- Vypolzovo
- Vysokaya
- Yednovo
- Yeremeyevo
- Yershovo
- Yezekiyevo
- Yudino
- Yushkovo
- Zagorye (Nizhneyerogodskoye Rural Settlement)
- Zagorye (Verkhneshardengskoye Rural Settlement)
- Zaozeritsa
- Zaozerye
- Zapan Bobrovnikovo
- Zaruchevye
- Zayamzha
- Zherebyatyevo
- Zhukovo
- Zhuravlevo
- Zolotavtsevo

== Verkhovazhsky District ==
Rural localities in Verkhovazhsky District:

- Abakumovskaya
- Afoninskaya (Nizhne-Vazhskoye Rural Settlement)
- Afoninskaya (Shelotskoye Rural Settlement)
- Akinkhovskaya
- Aksenovskaya
- Andreyevskaya
- Anisimovskaya
- Anisimovskaya (Shelotskoye Rural Settlement)
- Artemyevskaya
- Balanovskaya
- Barabanovo
- Basaylovo
- Bereg
- Bezymyannaya
- Biryuchevskaya
- Bolshedvorskaya
- Bolshoye Pogorelovo
- Bolshoye Yefimovo
- Borisovskaya
- Borovaya Pustosh
- Borovichikha
- Borovina
- Borovskaya
- Bosyginskaya
- Botyzhnaya
- Boyarskaya
- Brevnovskaya
- Bumazhnaya Fabrika
- Bushnitskaya
- Chavrovskaya
- Cheryomushki
- Chushevitsy
- Denisovskaya
- Dor
- Doroninskaya
- Doroshevitsa
- Dresvyanka (Chushevitskoye Rural Settlement)
- Dresvyanka (Shelotskoye Rural Settlement)
- Drugosimonovskaya
- Dubrova (Chushevitskoye Rural Settlement)
- Dubrova (Lipetskoye Rural Settlement)
- Dudorovo
- Duravinskaya
- Dyakonovskaya
- Feklukha
- Filinskaya
- Filinskaya (Nizhne-Vazhskoye Rural Settlement)
- Fominogorskaya
- Fominskaya (Kolengsky Selsoviet)
- Fominskaya (Morozovsky Selsoviet)
- Frolovskaya
- Garmanovo
- Gerasimovskaya
- Gniluzhskaya
- Gorka (Lipetskoye Rural Settlement)
- Gorka (Naumovsky Selsoviet)
- Gorka (Termengsky Selsoviet)
- Gorka-Nazarovskaya
- Gridino
- Grigorovskaya
- Grikhnevskaya
- Istopochnaya
- Ivanovskaya (Lipetsky Selsoviet)
- Ivanovskaya (Nizhne-Vazhskoye Rural Settlement)
- Ivanovskaya (Sibirsky Selsoviet)
- Ivonino
- Ivoninskaya
- Kalichye
- Kalinino
- Kamenka
- Kaychikha
- Kharitonovskaya
- Kharitonovskaya (Sibirskoye Rural Settlement)
- Khoroshevo
- Kiselevo
- Klimushino
- Klykovo
- Klyukinskaya
- Koptyayevskaya
- Korovino
- Kostyuninskaya
- Kostyuninskaya (Nizhne-Vazhskoye Rural Settlement)
- Kozevskaya
- Krasulino
- Krylovskaya
- Kudrino
- Kudrinskaya
- Kukolovskaya
- Labaznoye
- Leonovskaya
- Leushinskaya
- Lymzino
- Makarovskaya
- Makartsevo
- Maloye Pogorelovo
- Maloye Yefimovo
- Markovskaya
- Martynovskaya
- Mashkovskaya
- Matveyevskaya (Chushevitskoye Rural Settlement)
- Matveyevskaya (Verkhovsky Selsoviet)
- Mikhalevo
- Mikhaylovskaya
- Mininskaya
- Moiseyevskaya
- Moiseyevskaya
- Mokiyevskaya
- Mokiyevskaya
- Morozovo
- Moseyevo
- Motovilovo
- Mys
- Naumikha
- Nikolskaya
- Nikulinskaya
- Nivskaya
- Noginskaya
- Novaya Derevnya
- Olotinskaya
- Orekhovskaya
- Osnovinskaya
- Ostashevskaya
- Ostrovskaya
- Pakhomovskaya
- Papinskaya
- Parishchevo
- Payus
- Pestrukha
- Petrakovskaya
- Petrovskaya
- Pezhma
- Pikhtenik
- Pisuninskaya
- Ploskovo
- Plyoso
- Podsosenye
- Pogost Ilyinsky
- Potulovskaya
- Priluk
- Pukirevo
- Pyatino
- Rodionovskaya
- Rogachikha
- Rogna
- Rostovo
- Ruchyevskaya
- Ryapolovskaya
- Safronovskaya
- Sakulinskaya
- Samovo
- Savinskaya
- Savkovo
- Sboyevskaya
- Sekushinskaya
- Semyonovskaya
- Sergeyevskaya
- Shchekino
- Shchekotovskaya
- Shelota
- Silinskaya-1
- Silinskaya-2
- Simonovskaya
- Skulinskaya
- Sludnaya
- Smetanino
- Somitsyno
- Spirino
- Spitsynskaya
- Srednyaya
- Stepachevskaya
- Stepanovo
- Stikhovskaya
- Stolbovo
- Studentsevo
- Svetilnovo
- Tatarinskaya
- Terentyevskaya
- Titovskaya
- Tolstukha
- Tyoply Ruchey
- Udaltsovskaya
- Ulyankovo
- Urusovskaya
- Vakhrushevo
- Velikodvorskaya
- Verkhneye Makarovo
- Verkhovazhye
- Vladykina Gora
- Voronikha
- Voronovskaya
- Vysokoye
- Vysotinskaya
- Yakuninskaya
- Yalnichevskaya
- Yeksinskoye
- Yeliseyevskaya
- Yereminskoye
- Yevsyuninskaya
- Zabolotye
- Zakharovskaya (Morozovsky Selsoviet)
- Zakharovskaya (Sibirsky Selsoviet)
- Zhavoronkovo
- Zuyevskiye
- Zveglevitsy

== Vologda Urban Okrug ==
Rural localities in Vologda Urban Okrug:

- Molochnoye

== Vologodsky District ==
Rural localities in Vologodsky District:

- Abakanovo
- Abakshino
- Abramovo
- Abramtsevo
- Afanasovo
- Aksenovo
- Akulovo
- Aleshino
- Alexandrovo
- Alexandrovskoye
- Alexeyevo
- Alexeyevo
- Alexeyevo
- Alexino (Novlenskoye Rural Settlement)
- Alexino (Semyonkovskoye Rural Settlement)
- Alexino (Staroselskoye Rural Settlement)
- Anchakovo
- Anchutino
- Andrakovo
- Andreyevskoye
- Andronino
- Andronovo (Nesvoysky Selsoviet)
- Andronovo (Veprevsky Selsoviet)
- Androntsevo
- Andryushino
- Anfalovo
- Antonovo (Kubenskoye Rural Settlement)
- Antonovo (Novlenskoye Rural Settlement)
- Antsiferovo (Sosnovskoye Rural Settlement)
- Antsiferovo (Spasskoye Rural Settlement)
- Avdeyevo
- Babik
- Babikovo
- Babtsyno
- Bagrino
- Baklanikha
- Balobanovo
- Barachevo
- Barachevo
- Baralovo
- Barskoye
- Barskukovo
- Bedrino
- Beglovo
- Beketovo
- Beloye (Mayskoye Rural Settlement)
- Beloye (Staroselskoye Rural Settlement)
- Berezhok
- Bereznik
- Berezovka
- Besednoye
- Bilkovo
- Bobrovskoye
- Bogorodskoye
- Bolotovo
- Bolshoy Dvor
- Bolshoye Chertishchevo
- Bolshoye
- Boltino
- Boltutino
- Borborino
- Borilovo
- Borilovo-2
- Borisoglebskoye
- Borisovo (Kubenskoye Rural Settlement)
- Borisovo (Prilukskoye Rural Settlement)
- Borodkino
- Bovykino
- Bragino
- Brodki
- Bryacha
- Bubyrevo
- Bugrino
- Burdukovo
- Burtsevo
- Buyanovo
- Chakhlovo
- Chemodanovo
- Cherepanikha
- Chernevo
- Cherneyevo
- Chuprovo
- Davydkovo
- Dekteri
- Demino (Nesvoysky Selsoviet)
- Demino (Vysokovsky Selsoviet)
- Derevenka
- Dereventsevo
- Derevkovo
- Derevyagino
- Dikaya
- Dilyalevo
- Dityatyevo
- Dmitriyevo
- Dmitriyevskoye (Novlensky Selsoviet)
- Dmitriyevskoye (Spassky Selsoviet)
- Dolgovo
- Dolgovo
- Domanovo
- Dor (Kubenskoye Rural Settlement)
- Dor (Pudegsky Selsoviet)
- Dor (Staroselsky Selsoviet)
- Dorkovo
- Doronkino
- Dorozhny
- Dovodchikovo
- Drozdovo
- Dubrovo
- Dubrovskoye
- Dudinskoye
- Dulepovo
- Dulovo (Kubenskoye Rural Settlement)
- Dulovo (Staroselskoye Rural Settlement)
- Duplino
- Duravino
- Durnevo
- Dyakontsevo
- Dyakovo
- Dyatkino
- Dyukovo
- Faleleyevo
- Fenino
- Fetinino
- Filisovo
- Filkino
- Filyutino
- Fofantsevo
- Fomkino
- Frolovskoye
- Fryazinovo
- GES
- Gavrilovo
- Glotovo
- Golenevo
- Golubkovo
- Goncharka
- Gorbovo (Novlenskoye Rural Settlement)
- Gorbovo (Sosnovskoye Rural Settlement)
- Gorka (Mayskoye Rural Settlement)
- Gorka (Staroselskoye Rural Settlement)
- Gorka-Ilyinskaya
- Gorka-Pokrovskaya
- Gorka-Pokrovskaya
- Gornoye
- Gorshkovo
- Gribkovo
- Gridenskoye
- Grishino
- Grozilovo
- Gulyayevo
- Gureikha
- Gureyevo
- Ignachevo
- Ignatovo
- Ilekino
- Ilyinskoye (Maysky Selsoviet)
- Ilyinskoye (Raboche-Krestyansky Selsoviet)
- Indalovo
- Irkhino
- Isakovo (Novlenskoye Rural Settlement)
- Isakovo (Sosnovskoye Rural Settlement)
- Isakovo (Staroselskoye Rural Settlement)
- Isayevo (Novlenskoye Rural Settlement)
- Ivakino
- Ivanovka
- Ivanovskoye (Markovsky Selsoviet)
- Ivanovskoye (Spassky Selsoviet)
- Ivanovskoye (Veprevsky Selsoviet)
- Ivashevo
- Ivatino
- Ivlevo
- Ivlevskoye
- Kalinkino
- Kargachevo
- Karpovskoye
- Kartsevo
- Kashkalino
- Katalovskoye
- Katunino
- Kedrovo
- Kelebardovo
- Kharachevo
- Khokhlevo
- Khomyakovo
- Khorobrets
- Khrebtovo
- Khripilevo
- Kindeyevo
- Kipelovo
- Kiriki-Ulita
- Kishkino
- Kishkino
- Kishkintso
- Klokunovo
- Klyushnikovo
- Knyaginino
- Knyazevo
- Knyazhevo
- Knyazhovo
- Kocheurovo
- Kolbino
- Kolbino
- Kolkino
- Kolokolovo
- Kolotilovo
- Koltseyevo
- Kolyshkino
- Komarovo
- Konishchevo
- Konshino
- Konstantinovo
- Koptsevo
- Kopylovo
- Korenevo
- Korobovo
- Korotkovo
- Kortsevo
- Korytovo
- Koskovo
- Kostino
- Kostromino
- Kosyakovo
- Kotelnikovo
- Kotlovo
- Kovshovo
- Kovylevo
- Kozhevnikovo
- Kozhino
- Kozino
- Kozitsyno
- Kraskovo
- Krasnovo
- Krasny Dvor
- Krivoye
- Kruglitsa
- Krugolka
- Kryazhevo
- Kryukovo
- Kuchino
- Kudrino
- Kudryavtsevo
- Kulakovo
- Kulemesovo
- Kuleshevo
- Kunovo
- Kurbatovo
- Kurdumovo
- Kurkino (Mayskoye Rural Settlement)
- Kurkino (Novlenskoye Rural Settlement)
- Kurovo
- Kurovskoye
- Kushchuba
- Kusyevo
- Kuvshinovo
- Kuzminskoye
- Kuznetsovka
- Lakhmino
- Lantyevo
- Lapach
- Larkino
- Laskovtsevo
- Lavkino
- Lavrentyevo
- Lebzino
- Legkoye
- Leskovo
- Leushkino
- Lifino
- Liminsky
- Linkovo
- Lisitsyno
- Lobkovo
- Lomtevo
- Loptunovo
- Luchnikovo
- Lukintsevo
- Lumba
- Lyagalovo
- Lyzlovo
- Makarovo (Kubenskoye Rural Settlement)
- Makarovo (Leskovskoye Rural Settlement)
- Makarovo (Novlenskoye Rural Settlement)
- Malashkovo
- Malaya Gorka
- Malgino
- Malonovlenskoye
- Maloye Chertishchevo
- Manino
- Mardasovo
- Marfino
- Markovo (Leskovsky Selsoviet)
- Markovo (Markovsky Selsoviet)
- Maryino
- Maryinskoye (Novlenskoye Rural Settlement)
- Maryinskoye (Semyonkovskoye Rural Settlement)
- Maryukhino
- Maslozavod
- Maslozavod
- Matveyevskoye (Kubensky Selsoviet)
- Matveyevskoye (Markovsky Selsoviet)
- Matveyevskoye (Novlenskoye Rural Settlement)
- Maurino (Mayskoye Rural Settlement)
- Maurino (Podlesnoye Rural Settlement)
- Maurino (Spasskoye Rural Settlement)
- Maximishchevo
- Maxino
- Mayega
- Maysky
- Meldan
- Melnikovo
- Meniki
- Menshovskoye
- Michkovo
- Midyanovo
- Migunovo
- Mikhalevo (Novlenskoye Rural Settlement)
- Mikhalevo (Podlesnoye Rural Settlement)
- Mikhaltsevo
- Milkovo
- Mineyka
- Minino (Kubenskoye Rural Settlement)
- Minino (Novlenskoye Rural Settlement)
- Mironositsa
- Mitenskoye
- Mitenskoye
- Mitropolye
- Mityukovo
- Molbishcha
- Molitvino
- Molochnaya
- Morino
- Moseykovo
- Mostishcha
- Mozhayskoye
- Muravyovo
- Myagrino
- Mynchakovo
- Myshkino
- Nadeyeyvo
- Nagornoye
- Nagoronovo
- Nagorskoye
- Natsepino
- Nazarovo
- Nefedovo
- Nekrasovo
- Nepotyagovo
- Nesterovskoye
- Nesvoyskoye
- Neverovskoye
- Nevinnikovo
- Nikiforovo
- Nikitino (Semyonkovskoye Rural Settlement)
- Nikitino (Spasskoye Rural Settlement)
- Nikulino (Kuebnskoye Rural Settlement)
- Nikulino (Markovskoye Rural Settlement)
- Nikulino (Mayskoye Rural Settlement)
- Nikulinskoye
- Nizhneye
- Nizma
- Norobovo
- Novgorodovo
- Novlenskoye
- Novoye (Kubenskoye Rural Settlement)
- Novoye (Leskovskoye Rural Settlement)
- Novoye (Sosnovskoye Rural Settlement)
- Novoye (Staroselskoye Rural Settlement)
- Novy Istochnik
- Obraztsovo
- Obrosovo
- Obsakovo
- Obukhovo (Kubenskoye Rural Settlement)
- Obukhovo (Semyonkovskoye Rural Settlement)
- Obukhovo (Staroselskoye Rural Settlement)
- Odoleikha
- Ogarkovo
- Ogibalovo
- Okhlopkovo
- Okulovo
- Olekhovo
- Oleshevo
- Omogayevo
- Opikhalino
- Opuchkovo
- Oreshnik
- Orlovo
- Osinnik
- Osinovka
- Osipovo
- Ostakhovo
- Ostanino
- Ostashevo
- Ostretsovo
- Ostretsovo
- Ostyunino
- Otekleyevo
- Otradnoye
- Ovsyannikovo
- Ozerkovo
- Pailovo
- Pakhtalovo
- Palkino
- Panovo
- Panteleyevo
- Papino
- Paprikha
- Parichino
- Pashinka
- Pavlikovo
- Pavlovo
- Pavshino (Kubenskoye Rural Settlement)
- Pavshino (Novlenskoye Rural Settlement)
- Perkhuryevo
- Perkhuryevo
- Peryevo
- Peryevo
- Peski
- Pesochnoye
- Pestovo
- Petrakovo (Mayskoye Rural Settlement)
- Petrakovo (Novlenskoye Rural Settlement)
- Petrovskoye
- Petrushino
- Pevomaysky
- Pirogovo
- Pishchalino
- Plyushchevo
- Pochenga
- Pochinok (Kipelovsky Selsoviet)
- Pochinok (Kubenskoye Rural Settlement)
- Pochinok (Leskovskoye Rural Settlement)
- Pochinok (Spasskoye Rural Settlement)
- Pochinok-2
- Podberevskoye
- Podberezye
- Podgorye
- Podol
- Podomartsevo
- Pogorelka
- Pogorelovo (Kubenskoye Rural Settlement)
- Pogorelovo (Sosnovskoye Rural Settlement)
- Pogost Dmitriyevsky
- Pogost Onochest
- Pogost Voskresenye
- Pogostets
- Pokrovskoye
- Polyanki
- Polyany
- Pomygalovo
- Popadyino
- Popovka (Mayskoye Rural Settlement)
- Popovka (Novlenskoye Rural Settlement)
- Popovka (Semyonkovskoye Rural Settlement)
- Popovo
- Popovskoye. Kubenskoye Rural Settlement
- Posykino
- Potanino
- Potrokhovo
- Pribytkovo
- Pribytkovo
- Prokhorovo
- Prokino (Novlenskoye Rural Settlement)
- Prokino (Staroselskoye Rural Settlement)
- Prokunino (Leskovskoye Rural Settlement)
- Prokunino (Staroselskoye Rural Settlement)
- Puchinino
- Pudega
- Putyatino
- Raskopino
- Rebrovo
- Redkino
- Reshetnikovo
- Rezvino
- Rodiontsevo
- Rogachyovo
- Rogozkino
- Romanovo
- Roslovskoye
- Roslyatino
- Rossolovo
- Rubtsovo
- Runovo
- Sarayevo
- Savkino
- Sazonovo
- Selezentsevo
- Seleznevo
- Selishcha
- Semenkovo (Goncharovsky Selsoviet)
- Semenkovo (Oktyabrsky Selsoviet)
- Semenkovo (Semenkovsky Selsoviet)
- Semenkovo (Staroselskoye Rural Settlement)
- Semigory
- Semigorye
- Semryukhovo
- Semshino
- Semyonovskoye (Novlensky Selsoviet)
- Semyonovskoye (Podlesnoy Selsoviet)
- Seredneye
- Sestrilka
- Sevastyanovo
- Severnaya Ferma
- Severovo
- Shadrino
- Shatalovo
- Shchapilino
- Shchekino
- Shcherbinino
- Shchetnikovo
- Shchipino
- Shchukarevo
- Shelygino
- Shilovo
- Shirogorye
- Shiryayevo
- Sholokhovo
- Shulgino
- Sidelnikovo
- Sidorovo
- Silino
- Sindosh
- Sinitsyno
- Skorbezhevo
- Skresenskoye
- Skripilovo
- Skryabino
- Slobodishcha
- Smykovo
- Snasudovo
- Sopyatino
- Sosnovka
- Spass
- Spasskoye
- Sporyshevo
- Stralevo
- Strelkovo
- Sukholomovo
- Sukholzhino
- Sulinskoye
- Susolovo
- Svetilki
- Svobodny Ugol
- Syama
- Sychevo
- Taraskovo
- Tarasovo
- Tatarinovo
- Tatarovo
- Telyachyevo
- Terpelka
- Tishinovo
- Trofimovo
- Trufanovo
- Tsypoglazovo
- Tupochelovo
- Turutino
- Tyutryumovo
- Utkino
- Vakhnevo
- Vakhrushevo
- Varlamovo
- Vasilyevskoye
- Vasilyovo
- Vasnevo
- Vasyunino
- Vatlanovo
- Vedrakovo
- Vedrovo
- Velikoye (Kubenskoye Rural Settlement)
- Velikoye (Prilukskoye Rural Settlement)
- Veprevo
- Vepri
- Vetskoye
- Viktovo
- Vinnikovo
- Virlovo
- Viselkino
- Vladychnevo
- Vladychnevo
- Vlasyevo
- Vodogino
- Volkovo (Podlesnoye Rural Settlement)
- Volkovo (Spasskoye Rural Settlement)
- Volochaninovo
- Volshnitsy
- Voronino
- Voskresenskoye (Kubenskoye Rural Settlement)
- Voskresenskoye (Sosnovskoye Rural Settlement)
- Votolino
- Vozdvizhenye
- Vysochka
- Vysokovo
- Vysokovo-1 (Kubenskoye Rural Settlement)
- Vysokovo-1 (Novlenskoye Rural Settlement)
- Vysokovo-2
- Yakovlevskoye
- Yakovtsevo
- Yakunino
- Yaminovo
- Yangosar
- Yarilovo
- Yarunovo
- Yarygino
- Yefimovo
- Yelgino
- Yelizarovo
- Yeltsyno
- Yelyakovo
- Yemelyanovo
- Yepifanka
- Yeremeyevo (Leskovskoye Rural Settlement)
- Yeremeyevo (Novlenskoye Rural Settlement)
- Yermakovo
- Yermolovo (Kubenskoye Rural Settlement)
- Yermolovo (Mayskoye Rural Settlement)
- Yermolovskoye
- Yerofeyka
- Yeskino
- Yesyukovo
- Yesyunino
- Yevlashevo
- Yurovo
- Yuryevo
- Yuryevtsevo
- Zabolotnoye
- Zabolotye
- Zakharovo
- Zakharyino
- Zakobyaykino
- Zakryshkino
- Zalomaikha
- Zaonikiyevo
- Zaprudka
- Zarechnaya
- Zarya
- Zazvitsevo
- Zhavoronkovo
- Zhilino
- Zhukovo
- Zrelovo
- Zuyevo

== Vozhegodsky District ==
Rural localities in Vozhegodsky District:

- Abaturikha
- Agafonovskaya
- Alferyevskaya
- Andreyevskaya
- Anisimovskaya
- Ankudinovskaya
- Antsiferovskaya
- Antsiferovskaya (Yavengskoye Rural Settlement)
- Anufriyevskaya
- Baranikha
- Baranovskaya
- Barkanovskaya
- Baza
- Beketovo
- Beketovskaya
- Belavinskaya
- Blinovskaya
- Bolshaya Klimovskaya
- Bolshaya Nazarovskaya
- Bolshoye Ramenye
- Bor
- Borisovo
- Boyarskaya
- Bucherovskaya
- Bukhara
- Bykovo
- Bykovskaya (Yavengskoye Rural Settlement)
- Bykovskaya (Yuchkinskoye Rural Settlement)
- Checheninskaya
- Chernovskaya
- Chichirino
- Danilovskaya
- Derevenka
- Dorkovskaya
- Dorovikha
- Drovdil
- Dubrovinskaya
- Fatyanovo
- Fedyayevskaya
- Fedyuninskaya
- Filatovskaya
- Fominskaya
- Fomishchevo
- Funikovo
- Galuninskaya
- Gashkovo
- Glazunovskaya
- Gora (Tiginskoye Rural Settlement)
- Gora (Yavengskoye Rural Settlement)
- Gorka (Beketovskoye Rural Settlement)
- Gorka (Mishutinskoye Rural Settlement)
- Gridinskaya
- Grishinskaya
- Grishkovskaya
- Gubinskaya
- Ignatovskaya
- Isakovo
- Isakovskaya
- Ivankovo
- Ivanovskaya (Mishutinsky Selsoviet)
- Ivanovskaya (Vozhegodsky Selsoviet)
- Ivoninskaya
- Kadnikovsky
- Karpovskaya
- Karpovskaya
- Khmelevskaya
- Khmylitsa
- Khodinskaya
- Kholdynka
- Kholuy
- Khvostovo (Beketovskoye Rural Settlement)
- Khvostovo (Yuchkinskoye Rural Settlement)
- Kladovka
- Klimovskaya (Mishutinsky Selsoviet)
- Klimovskaya (Nizhneslobodsky Selsoviet)
- Konechnaya (Lipino-Kalikinsky Selsoviet)
- Konechnaya (Punemsky Selsoviet)
- Konevka
- Korgozero
- Korotkovskaya
- Korotyginskaya
- Korovinskaya
- Koryakinskaya
- Kostyuninskaya
- Kozlovo (Beketovskoye Rural Settlement)
- Kozlovo (Yavengskoye Rural Settlement)
- Krapivino
- Kropufinskaya
- Kubinskaya
- Kuklinskaya
- Kuritsino
- Kurshiyevskaya
- Kutilovo
- Kuznetsovskaya
- Leshchevka
- Levinskaya (Nizhneslobodskoye Rural Settlement)
- Levinskaya (Tiginskoye Rural Settlement)
- Levkovskaya
- Lobanikha
- Loshchinskaya
- Lukyanovskaya
- Lupachikha
- Malaya Nazarovskaya
- Malaya
- Maleyevskaya
- Maloye Ramenye
- Manuilovskaya
- Maryinskaya
- Matveyevskaya
- Miguyevskaya
- Mikhaylovskaya
- Mikheyevskaya
- Mishutinskaya
- Mitinskaya (Nizhneslobodskoye Rural Settlement)
- Mitinskaya (Yavengskoye Rural Settlement)
- Mitrofanovo
- Molodyozhny
- Munskaya
- Mushchininskaya
- Myshino
- Mytnik
- Nadporozhye
- Navolok
- Nazarovskaya
- Nefedovskaya
- Nefedovskaya
- Nekrasovskaya
- Nikitino
- Nikitinskaya
- Nikolskaya
- Nikulskaya
- Nizhnyaya
- Novaya
- Novozhilikha
- Ogarkovskaya
- Ogibalovo
- Okulovskaya (Nizhneslobodsky Selsoviet)
- Okulovskaya (Ramensky Selsoviet)
- Okulovskaya-1
- Olekhovskaya
- Olshukovskaya
- Olyushino
- Olyushinskaya
- Osiyevskaya
- Ospodarevskaya
- Otradnoye
- Ozhiginskaya
- Padinskaya
- Pankovo
- Panteleyevskaya
- Patrakeyevskaya
- Pavlovskaya (Nizhneslobodsky Selsoviet)
- Pavlovskaya (Vozhegodsky Selsoviet)
- Pavlovskaya (Yavengsky Selsoviet)
- Pekhtach
- Pelevikha
- Perepechikha
- Peshkovo
- Pesok (Tavengsky Selsoviet)
- Pesok (Tiginsky Selsoviet)
- Pestinskaya
- Petrovka
- Petrovo
- Petrovskaya
- Pilyevo
- Podolnaya
- Podsosenye
- Pogorelka
- Pogorelovo
- Pokrovskaya
- Pokrovskoye
- Popovka Kalikinskaya
- Popovka (Mishutinskoye Rural Settlement)
- Popovka (Vozhegodskoye Urban Settlement)
- Popovka (Yukchinskoye Rural Settlement)
- Porokhino
- Pozdeyevskaya
- Pozhar
- Pozharishche
- Proletarsky
- Rakishevo
- Repnyakovskaya
- Rubtsovo
- Ruchyevskaya
- Safonovskaya
- Salnik
- Samoylovskaya
- Savinskaya (Tiginsky Selsoviet)
- Savinskaya (Vozhegodsky Selsoviet)
- Semyonovskaya (Beketovsky Selsoviet)
- Semyonovskaya (Yavengskoye Rural Settlement)
- Senkinskaya
- Shchegolikha
- Shchekotovskaya
- Sigovskaya
- Soroginskaya
- Sorozhinskaya
- Sosnovitsa
- Stepanikha (Tiginskoye Rural Settlement)
- Stepanikha (Vozhegodskoye Urban Settlement)
- Stepanovskaya
- Stolbikha
- Strokavino
- Surkovskaya
- Syamba
- Syrnevo
- Tarasovskaya (Beketovsky Selsoviet)
- Tarasovskaya (Yavengskoye Rural Settlement)
- Tigino
- Timoninskaya
- Timoshinskaya
- Tingotomo
- Todelovskaya
- Tupitsyno
- Turabovskaya
- Turovo
- Tyurikovskaya
- Uglenskaya
- Ugol
- Ulitinskaya
- Vafunenskaya
- Vasilyevskaya (Yavengskoye Rural Settlement)
- Vasilyevskaya (Yuchkinskoye Rural Settlement)
- Vershina
- Voskresenskoye
- Vysokaya
- Yagrysh
- Yakhrenga
- Yakovlevo
- Yakuninskaya
- Yakushevskaya
- Yakutinskaya
- Yefimovskaya
- Yekimovskaya
- Yelenskaya
- Yemelyanovskaya
- Yereminskaya
- Yesinskaya
- Yeskinskaya
- Yurkovskaya
- Zabereznik
- Zaozerye
- Zarechnaya
- Zasukhonskaya
- Zavrag
- Zinenskaya
- Zuyevo

== Vytegorsky District ==
Rural localities in Vytegorsky District:

- Agafonovskaya
- Alexandrovskoye
- Andreyevskaya
- Annensky Most
- Antsiferovo
- Antsiferovskaya
- Badozhsky Pogost
- Bely Ruchey
- Bereg
- Bessonovo
- Blizhnyaya Kardanka
- Chekovo
- Deminskaya
- Gorny Ruchey
- Ignatovo
- Ivakovskaya
- Ivanovskaya (Vytegorsky District)
- Kabetsovo
- Kanshino
- Kardanga
- Karpovskaya
- Kostruchey
- Koybino
- Kryukovskaya
- Kurvoshsky Pogost
- Kuzminka
- Kuzminskaya
- Kyabelovo
- Lakhnovo
- Loychino
- Matveyevo
- Mironovo
- Morozovo
- Nikulino
- Nizhneye Ponizovye
- Nizhnyaya Vodlitsa
- Novostroyka
- Oktyabrsky
- Oshta
- Paltoga
- Pavshozero
- Prokshino
- Pryachevo
- Rogozino
- Rubtsovo
- Saminsky Pogost
- Semyonovskaya
- Shchekino
- Sidorovo
- Silovo
- Simanovo
- Sorochye Pole
- Sorokopolye
- Spitsyno
- Sredny Rubezh
- Staroye Petrovskoye
- Startsevo
- Syargozero
- Tatarikha
- Terovo
- Titovo
- Troshigino
- Tudozersky Pogost
- Ustye
- Uzhla
- Vashukovo
- Verkhny Rubezh
- Verkhnyaya Vodlitsa
- Volokov Most
- Yakshino
- Yelinskaya
- Yevsinskaya
- Zagorodskaya
- Zhelvachevo

== See also ==
- Lists of rural localities in Russia
