= Virlovo =

Virlovo Вирлово
- Village
- Location within Vologda Oblast Location within Russia
- Coordinates: 59°25′N 39°21′E
- Country: Russia
- Region: Vologda Oblast
- District: Vologodsky District
- Time zone: UTC+3:00

Virlovo (Russian: Вирлово) is a rural locality (a village) in Kubenskoye Rural Settlement, Vologodsky District, Vologda Oblast, Russia. The population was 10 as of 2002.

== Geography ==
Virlovo is located 55 km northwest of Vologda (the district's administrative centre) by road. Yelyakovo is the nearest rural locality.
