= Grishino, Vologodsky District, Vologda Oblast =

Grishino Гришино
- Village
- Location within Vologda Oblast Location within Russia
- Coordinates: 59°17′N 39°54′E
- Country: Russia
- Region: Vologda Oblast
- District: Vologodsky District
- Time zone: UTC+3:00

Grishino (Russian: Гришино) is a rural locality (a village) in Prilukskoye Rural Settlement, Vologodsky District, Vologda Oblast, Russia. The population was 44 as of 2002.

== Geography ==
Grishino is located 9 km north of Vologda (the district's administrative centre) by road. Dorozhny is the nearest rural locality.
