= Patino, Vologda Oblast =

Patino Патино
- Village
- Location within Vologda Oblast Location within Russia
- Coordinates: 59°10′N 37°37′E
- Country: Russia
- Region: Vologda Oblast
- District: Cherepovetsky District
- Time zone: UTC+3:00

Patino (Russian: Патино) is a rural locality (a village) in Nelazskoye Rural Settlement, Cherepovetsky District, Vologda Oblast, Russia. The population was 43 as of 2002.

== Geography ==
Patino is located 27 km (17 mi) northwest of Cherepovets (the district's administrative centre) by road. Nelazskoye is the nearest rural locality.
