= Plenishnik =

Plenishnik Пленишник
- Village
- Location within Vologda Oblast Location within Russia
- Coordinates: 58°43′N 37°23′E
- Country: Russia
- Region: Vologda Oblast
- District: Cherepovetsky District
- Time zone: UTC+3:00

Plenishnik (Russian: Пленишник) is a rural locality (a village) in Yagnitskoye Rural Settlement, Cherepovetsky District, Vologda Oblast, Russia. The population was 125 as of 2002. There are 8 streets.

== Geography ==
Plenishnik is located 97 km (60 mi) southwest of Cherepovets (the district's administrative centre) by road. Myshkino is the nearest rural locality.
