= Ivlevo, Vologda Oblast =

Ivlevo Ивлево
- Village
- Location within Vologda Oblast Location within Russia
- Coordinates: 59°15′N 39°45′E
- Country: Russia
- Region: Vologda Oblast
- District: Vologodsky District
- Time zone: UTC+3:00

Ivlevo (Russian: Ивлево) is a rural locality (a village) in Mayskoye Rural Settlement, Vologodsky District, Vologda Oblast, Russia. The population was 20 as of 2002.

== Geography ==
Ivlevo is located 10 km northwest of Vologda (the district's administrative centre) by road. Maysky is the nearest rural locality.
