= Zakharyino, Vologodsky District, Vologda Oblast =

Zakharyino Захарьино
- Village
- Location within Vologda Oblast Location within Russia
- Coordinates: 59°19′N 39°02′E
- Country: Russia
- Region: Vologda Oblast
- District: Vologodsky District
- Time zone: UTC+3:00

Zakharyino (Russian: Захарьино) is a rural locality (a village) in Staroselskoye Rural Settlement, Vologodsky District, Vologda Oblast, Russia. The population was 13 as of 2002.

== Geography ==
Zakharyino is located 70 km northwest of Vologda (the district's administrative centre) by road. Yesyukovo is the nearest rural locality.
