= Shchukarevo =

Shchukarevo Щукарево
- Village
- Location within Vologda Oblast Location within Russia
- Coordinates: 59°19′N 39°45′E
- Country: Russia
- Region: Vologda Oblast
- District: Vologodsky District
- Time zone: UTC+3:00

Shchukarevo (Russian: Щукарево) is a rural locality (a village) in Semyonkovskoye Rural Settlement, Vologodsky District, Vologda Oblast, Russia. The population was 1 as of 2002. There are 2 streets.

== Geography ==
Shchukarevo is located 21 km northwest of Vologda (the district's administrative centre) by road. Kraskovo is the nearest rural locality.
