= Lomtevo =

Lomtevo Ломтево
- Village
- Location within Vologda Oblast Location within Russia
- Coordinates: 59°08′N 39°13′E
- Country: Russia
- Region: Vologda Oblast
- District: Vologodsky District
- Time zone: UTC+3:00

Lomtevo (Russian: Ломтево) is a rural locality (a village) in Staroselskoye Rural Settlement, Vologodsky District, Vologda Oblast, Russia. The population was 107 as of 2002. There are 3 streets.

== Geography ==
Lomtevo is located 44 km southwest of Vologda (the district's administrative centre) by road. Duplino is the nearest rural locality.
