= Ilyina Gora, Vologda Oblast =

Ilyina Gora Ильина Гора
- Village
- Location within Vologda Oblast Location within Russia
- Coordinates: 59°34′N 37°40′E
- Country: Russia
- Region: Vologda Oblast
- District: Cherepovetsky District
- Time zone: UTC+3:00

Ilyina Gora (Russian: Ильина Гора) is a rural locality (a village) in Voskresenskoye Rural Settlement, Cherepovetsky District, Vologda Oblast, Russia. The population was 17 as of 2002.

== Geography ==
Ilyina Gora is located 67 km (42 mi) northwest of Cherepovets (the district's administrative centre) by road. Popovskoye is the nearest rural locality.
