= Selishche, Cherepovetsky District, Vologda Oblast =

Selishche Селище
- Selo
- Location within Vologda Oblast Location within Russia
- Coordinates: 59°16′N 37°38′E
- Country: Russia
- Region: Vologda Oblast
- District: Cherepovetsky District
- Time zone: UTC+3:00

Selishche (Russian: Селище) is a rural locality (a selo) in Abakanovskoye Rural Settlement, Cherepovetsky District, Vologda Oblast, Russia. The population was 9 as of 2002.

== Geography ==
Selishche is located 34 km northwest of Cherepovets (the district's administrative centre) by road. Abakanovo is the nearest rural locality.
