= Baranovskaya =

Baranovskaya is a number of rural localities in Russia.

- Baranovskaya, Vozhegodsky District, Vologda Oblast
- Baranovskaya, Kaduysky District, Vologda Oblast
- Baranovskaya, Kargopolsky District, Arkhangelsk Oblast
