= Nikitino, Spasskoye Rural Settlement, Vologodsky District, Vologda Oblast =

Nikitino Никитино
- Village
- Location within Vologda Oblast Location within Russia
- Coordinates: 58°54′N 39°31′E
- Country: Russia
- Region: Vologda Oblast
- District: Vologodsky District
- Time zone: UTC+3:00

Nikitino (Russian: Никитино) is a rural locality (a village) in Spasskoye Rural Settlement, Vologodsky District, Vologda Oblast, Russia. The population was 5 as of 2002.

== Geography ==
The distance to Vologda is 63.6 km, to Nepotyagovo is 31 km. Kruglitsa is the nearest rural locality.
