= Isakovo, Sosnovskoye Rural Settlement, Vologodsky District, Vologda Oblast =

Isakovo Исаково
- Village
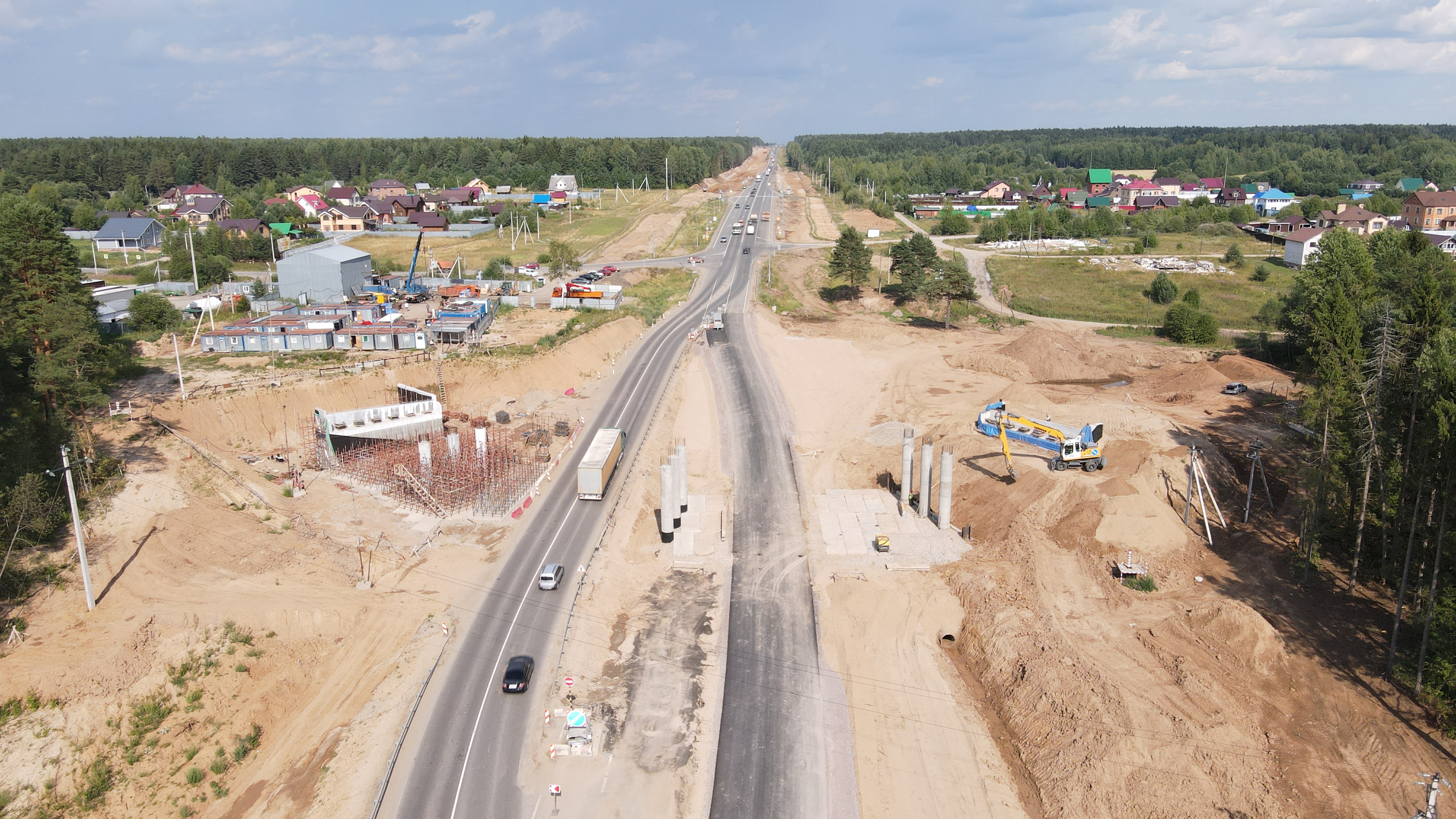

- Location within Vologda Oblast Location within Russia
- Coordinates: 59°11′N 39°35′E
- Country: Russia
- Region: Vologda Oblast
- District: Vologodsky District
- Time zone: UTC+3:00

Isakovo (Russian: Исаково) is a rural locality (a village) in Sosnovskoye Rural Settlement, Vologodsky District, Vologda Oblast, Russia. The population was 2 as of 2002.

== Geography ==
The distance to Vologda is 21.5 km, to Sosnovka is 2 km. Molitvino, Goluzino, Kindeyevo, Sosnovka are the nearest rural localities.
