= Kurkino, Mayskoye Rural Settlement, Vologodsky District, Vologda Oblast =

Kurkino Куркино
- Village
- Location within Vologda Oblast Location within Russia
- Coordinates: 59°21′N 39°37′E
- Country: Russia
- Region: Vologda Oblast
- District: Vologodsky District
- Time zone: UTC+3:00

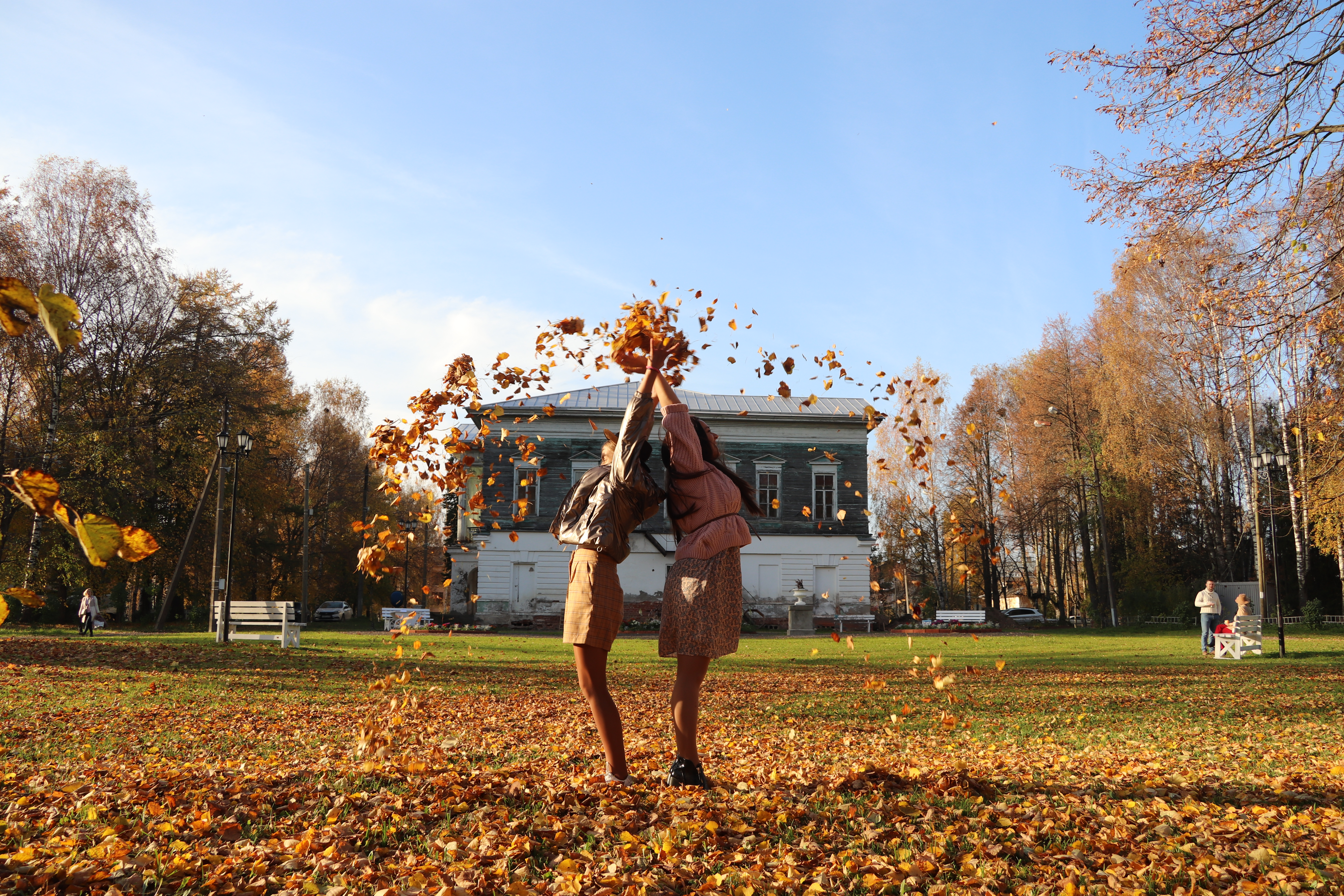

Kurkino (Russian: Куркино) is a rural locality (a village) in Kubenskoye Rural Settlement, Vologodsky District, Vologda Oblast, Russia. The population was 1,002 as of 2002. There are 13 streets.

== Geography ==
The distance to Vologda is 29 km, to Mayskoye is 13 km. Megleyevo, Kolbino are the nearest rural localities.
