= Vepri =

Vepri Вепри
- Village
- Location within Vologda Oblast Location within Russia
- Coordinates: 59°23′N 39°17′E
- Country: Russia
- Region: Vologda Oblast
- District: Vologodsky District
- Time zone: UTC+3:00

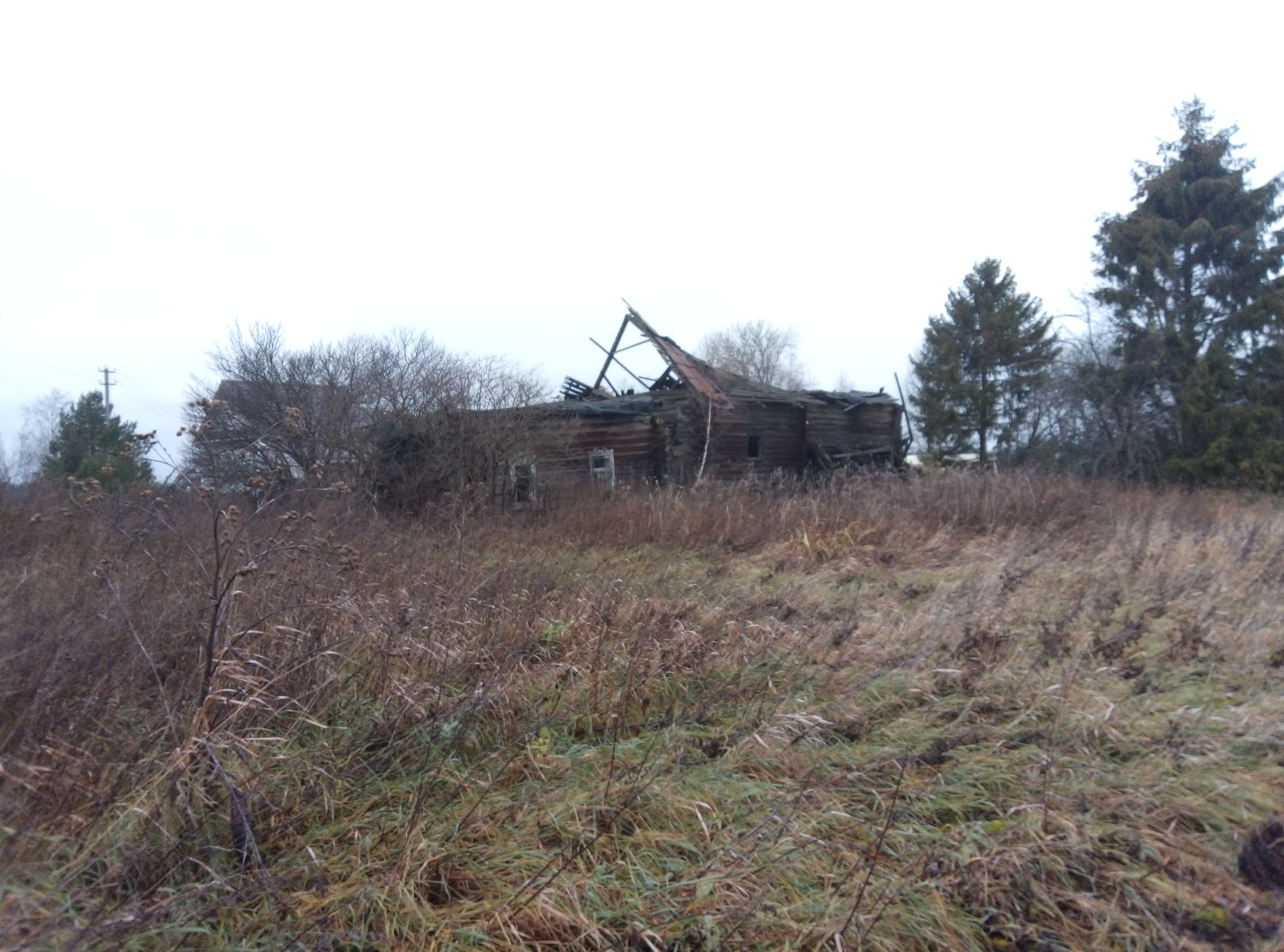
The ruins of a once residential building in the village of Vepri

Vepri (Russian: Вепри) is a rural locality (a village) in Kubenskoye Rural Settlement, Vologodsky District, Vologda Oblast, Russia. The population was 2 as of 2002.

== Geography ==
Vepri is located 53 km northwest of Vologda (the district's administrative centre) by road. Antonovo is the nearest rural locality.
