= Fenino =

Fenino Фенино
- Village
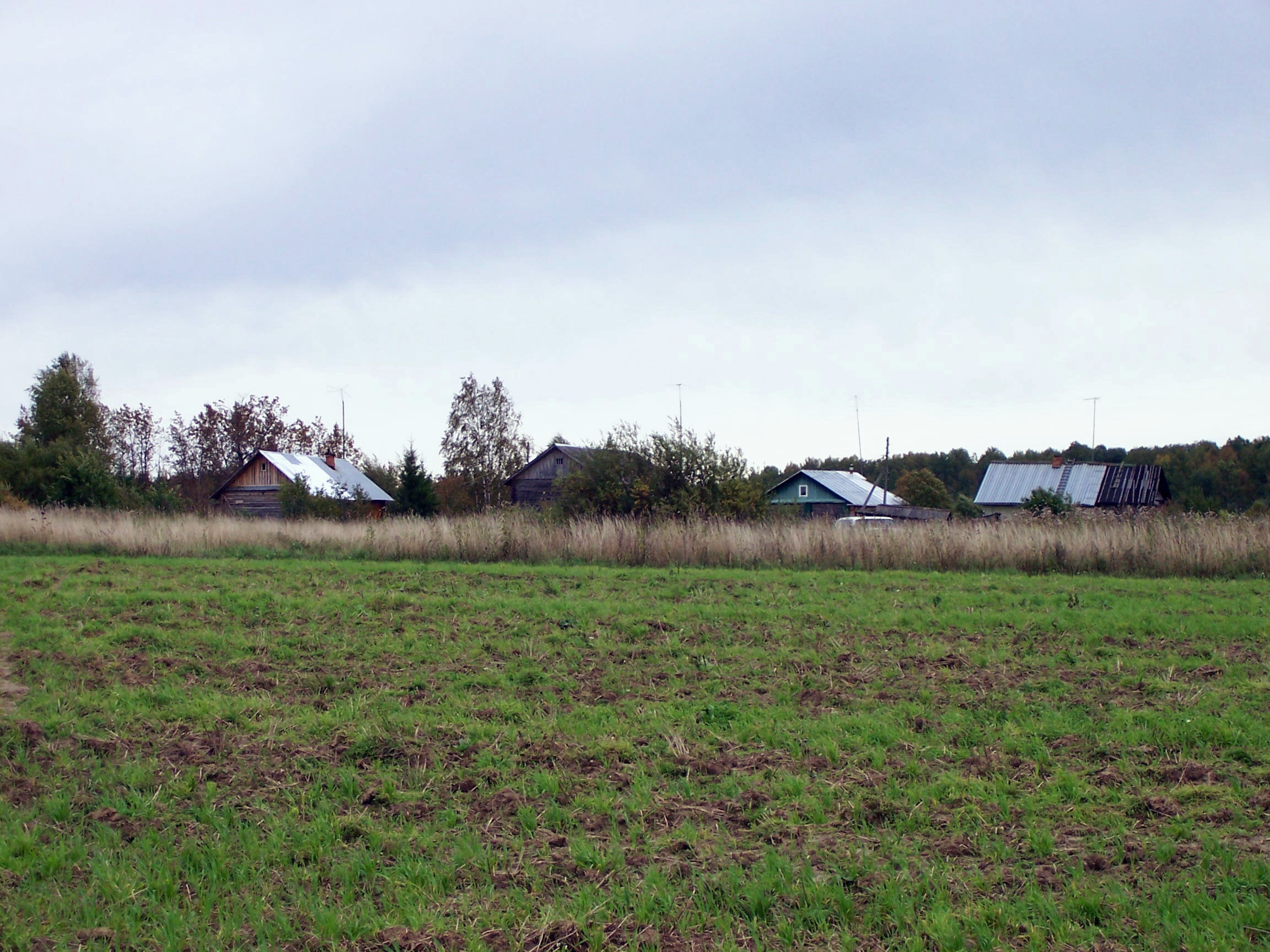
- Fenino

- Location within Vologda Oblast Location within Russia
- Coordinates: 59°23′N 39°23′E
- Country: Russia
- Region: Vologda Oblast
- District: Vologodsky District
- Time zone: UTC+3:00

Fenino (Russian: Фенино) is a rural locality (a village) in Kubenskoye Rural Settlement, Vologodsky District, Vologda Oblast, Russia. The population was 6 as of 2002.

== Geography ==
Fenino is located 52 km northwest of Vologda (the district's administrative centre) by road. Glotovo is the nearest rural locality.
