= Panteleymonovskoye =

Panteleymonovskoye Пантелеймоновское
- Village
- Location within Vologda Oblast Location within Russia
- Coordinates: 59°39′N 38°03′E
- Country: Russia
- Region: Vologda Oblast
- District: Cherepovetsky District
- Time zone: UTC+3:00

Panteleymonovskoye (Russian: Пантелеймоновское) is a rural locality (a village) in Voskresenskoye Rural Settlement, Cherepovetsky District, Vologda Oblast, Russia. The population was 28 as of 2002.

== Geography ==
Panteleymonovskoye is located 69 km (43 mi) northeast of Cherepovets (the district's administrative centre) by road. Prokshino is the nearest rural locality.
