= Yugi, Vologda Oblast =

Yugi Юги
- Village
- Location within Vologda Oblast Location within Russia
- Coordinates: 58°59′N 38°12′E
- Country: Russia
- Region: Vologda Oblast
- District: Cherepovetsky District
- Time zone: UTC+3:00

Yugi (Russian: Юги) is a rural locality (a village) in Yugskoye Rural Settlement, Cherepovetsky District, Vologda Oblast, Russia. The population was 2 as of 2002.

== Geography ==
Yugi is located 33 km southeast of Cherepovets (the district's administrative centre) by road. Pavlichevo is the nearest rural locality.
