= Pavlichevo =

Pavlichevo Павличево
- Village
- Location within Vologda Oblast Location within Russia
- Coordinates: 58°59′N 38°13′E
- Country: Russia
- Region: Vologda Oblast
- District: Cherepovetsky District
- Time zone: UTC+3:00

Pavlichevo (Russian: Павличево) is a rural locality (a village) in Yugskoye Rural Settlement, Cherepovetsky District, Vologda Oblast, Russia. The population was 2 as of 2002.

== Geography ==
Pavlichevo is located 33 km (21 mi) southeast of Cherepovets (the district's administrative centre) by road. Yugi is the nearest rural locality.
