= Nikitino, Semyonkovskoye Rural Settlement, Vologodsky District, Vologda Oblast =

Nikitino Никитино
- Village
- Location within Vologda Oblast Location within Russia
- Coordinates: 59°17′N 39°50′E
- Country: Russia
- Region: Vologda Oblast
- District: Vologodsky District
- Time zone: UTC+3:00

Nikitino (Russian: Никитино) is a rural locality (a village) in Semyonkovskoye Rural Settlement, Vologodsky District, Vologda Oblast, Russia. The population was 50 as of 2002.

== Geography ==
The distance to Vologda is 9 km, to Semyonkovo is 1 km. Semyonkovo is the nearest rural locality.

It is part of the Semenkovsky rural settlement, from the point of view of administrative-territorial division - in the Semenkovsky village council.

The distance by road to the center of the municipality Semyonkovo is 1 km. The nearest settlements are Barachevo, Yarygino, Krasnovo, Semyonkovo, Borilovo, Trufanovo, Abakanovo.
