= Gorka-Pokrovskaya, Staroselskoye Rural Settlement, Vologodsky District, Vologda Oblast =

Gorka-Pokrovskaya Горка-Покровская
- Village
- Location within Vologda Oblast Location within Russia
- Coordinates: 59°17′46″N 39°19′56″E
- Country: Russia
- Region: Vologda Oblast
- District: Vologodsky District
- Time zone: UTC+3:00

Gorka-Pokrovskaya (Russian: Горка-Покровская) is a rural locality (a village) in Staroselskoye Rural Settlement, Vologodsky District, Vologda Oblast, Russia. The population was 1 as of 2002, 15 as of 1941

== History ==
One of the oldest villages in Vologda Oblast, on the map of the Vologda Okruga in 1794 it is designated as Gorka (Russian: Горка).

== Geography ==
Gorka-Pokrovskaya is located on the right bank of the Maslyanaya River, 69 km northwest of Vologda (the district's administrative centre) by road. Sychevo is the nearest rural locality.
