= Yermolovo, Kubenskoye Rural Settlement, Vologodsky District, Vologda Oblast =

Yermolovo Ермолово
- Village
- Location within Vologda Oblast Location within Russia
- Coordinates: 59°27′N 39°11′E
- Country: Russia
- Region: Vologda Oblast
- District: Vologodsky District
- Time zone: UTC+3:00

Yermolovo (Russian: Ермолово) is a type of inhabited locality in Russia (a village) in Kubenskoye Rural Settlement, Vologodsky District, Vologda Oblast, Russia. The population was 3 as of 2002.

== Geography ==
The distance to Vologda is 72 km, and to Kubenskoye is 27 km. Nearby rural localities include Yefimovo, Babik, Dolmatovo, Lavrentyevo, Krinki, Nikulino, Borisoglebskoye, Popovskoye, Mynchakovo, Vysokovo-1, and Potrokhovo.
