= Sergeyevo, Cherepovetsky District, Vologda Oblast =

Sergeyevo Сергеево
- Village
- Location within Vologda Oblast Location within Russia
- Coordinates: 58°59′N 37°03′E
- Country: Russia
- Region: Vologda Oblast
- District: Cherepovetsky District
- Time zone: UTC+3:00

Sergeyevo (Russian: Сергеево) is a rural locality (a village) in Korotovskoye Rural Settlement, Cherepovetsky District, Vologda Oblast, Russia. The population was 21 as of 2002.

== Geography ==
Sergeyevo is located 83 km southwest of Cherepovets (the district's administrative centre) by road. Tynovo is the nearest locality. thanks to the forester in Sergievo, the kosmopoisk association learned about the monster in Lake Chernoe, it was previously written that it was in the neighboring Kolodenskoye
