= Volkovo, Podlesnoye Rural Settlement, Vologodsky District, Vologda Oblast =

Volkovo Волково
- Village
- Location within Vologda Oblast Location within Russia
- Coordinates: 59°10′N 39°58′E
- Country: Russia
- Region: Vologda Oblast
- District: Vologodsky District
- Time zone: UTC+3:00

Volkovo (Russian: Волково) is a rural locality (a village) in Podlesnoye Rural Settlement, Vologodsky District, Vologda Oblast, Russia. The population was 7 in 2002.

== Geography ==
The distance to Vologda is 20 kilometres (12 mi) and to Ogarkovo 7 kilometres (4.3 mi). Kharachevo, Burlevo, Babikovo, Mostishcha, Andreyevskoye, Yarilovo and Kozino are the nearest rural localities.
