= Nadporozhye, Cherepovetsky District, Vologda Oblast =

Nadporozhye Надпорожье
- Selo
- Location within Vologda Oblast Location within Russia
- Coordinates: 59°36′N 38°03′E
- Country: Russia
- Region: Vologda Oblast
- District: Cherepovetsky District
- Time zone: UTC+3:00

Nadporozhye (Russian: Надпорожье) is a rural locality (a selo) in Voskresenskoye Rural Settlement, Cherepovetsky District, Vologda Oblast, Russia. The population was 89 as of 2002.

According to the 2002 census, the population was 89 people (44 men, 45 women). The entire population is Russian.

== Geography ==
Nadporozhye is located 63 km (39 mi) northeast of Cherepovets (the district's administrative centre) by road. Kotovo is the nearest rural locality.
