= Yeremeyevo, Novlenskoye Rural Settlement, Vologodsky District, Vologda Oblast =

Yeremeyevo Еремеево
- Village
- Location within Vologda Oblast Location within Russia
- Coordinates: 59°37′N 39°14′E
- Country: Russia
- Region: Vologda Oblast
- District: Vologodsky District
- Time zone: UTC+3:00

Yeremeyevo (Russian: Еремеево) is a rural locality (a village) in Novlenskoye Rural Settlement, Vologodsky District, Vologda Oblast, Russia. The population was 8 as of 2002.

== Geography ==
The distance to Vologda is 66 km, to Novlenskoye is 6 km. Kryukovo, Gorvovo, Filyutino, Gorka-Ilyinskaya, Yermolovskoye are the nearest rural localities.
