= Yermolovo, Mayskoye Rural Settlement, Vologodsky District, Vologda Oblast =

Yermolovo Ермолово
- Village
- Location within Vologda Oblast Location within Russia
- Coordinates: 59°16′N 39°46′E
- Country: Russia
- Region: Vologda Oblast
- District: Vologodsky District
- Time zone: UTC+3:00

Yermolovo (Russian: Ермолово) is a rural locality (a village) in Mayskoye Rural Settlement, Vologodsky District, Vologda Oblast, Russia. The population was 5 as of 2002.

== Geography ==
The distance to Vologda is 12.6 km, and to Maysky is 3 km. Salkovo, Pankino, Maryinskoye, Nagorskoye, Nikulino, Popovka, and Terentyevskoye are the nearest rural localities.
