= Yeremeyevo, Leskovskoye Rural Settlement, Vologodsky District, Vologda Oblast =

Yeremeyevo Еремеево
- Village
- Location within Vologda Oblast Location within Russia
- Coordinates: 59°13′N 39°38′E
- Country: Russia
- Region: Vologda Oblast
- District: Vologodsky District
- Time zone: UTC+3:00

Yeremeyevo (Russian: Еремеево) is a rural locality (a village) in Leskovskoye Rural Settlement, Vologodsky District, Vologda Oblast, Russia. The population was 7 as of 2002.

== Geography ==
The distance to Vologda is 21 km, and to Leskovo is 6 km. Yuryevo, Timofeyevskoye, Otradnoye, Yesikovo, and Kolkino are the nearest rural localities.
