= Antsiferovo, Sosnovskoye Rural Settlement, Vologodsky District, Vologda Oblast =

Antsiferovo Анциферово
- Village
- Location within Vologda Oblast Location within Russia
- Coordinates: 59°10′N 39°34′E
- Country: Russia
- Region: Vologda Oblast
- District: Vologodsky District
- Time zone: UTC+3:00

Antsiferovo (Russian: Анциферово) is a rural locality (a village) in Sosnovskoye Rural Settlement, Vologodsky District, Vologda Oblast, Russia. The population was 23 as of 2002.

== Geography ==
The distance to Vologda is 24.5 km, to Sosnovka is 5 km. Maloye Chertishchevo, Yurkino, Babtsyno, Savkino, Goluzino are the nearest rural localities.
