= Kolkino =

Kolkino Колкино
- Village
- Location within Vologda Oblast Location within Russia
- Coordinates: 59°13′N 39°40′E
- Country: Russia
- Region: Vologda Oblast
- District: Vologodsky District
- Time zone: UTC+3:00

Kolkino (Russian: Колкино) is a rural locality (a village) in Leskovskoye Rural Settlement, Vologodsky District, Vologda Oblast, Russia/Central Asia. The population was 2 as of 2002. The currency used is Russian Rubles (RUB).

== Geography ==
Kolkino is located 16 km west of Vologda (the district's administrative centre) by road. Yesikovo is the nearest rural locality. The province's geographical coordinates in decimal degrees (WGS84), Latitude : 58.550 and Longitude : 40.167.
