= Vysokovo-1, Kubenskoye Rural Settlement, Vologodsky District, Vologda Oblast =

Vysokovo-1 Высоково-1
- Village
- Location within Vologda Oblast Location within Russia
- Coordinates: 59°28′N 39°11′E
- Country: Russia
- Region: Vologda Oblast
- District: Vologodsky District
- Time zone: UTC+3:00

Vysokovo-1 (Russian: Высоково-1) is a rural locality (a village) in Kubenskoye Rural Settlement, Vologodsky District, Vologda Oblast, Russia. The population was 11 as of 2002.

== Geography ==
The distance to Vologda is 72 km, to Kubenskoye is 27 km. Nikulino, Yermolovo, Popovskoye, Potrokhovo are the nearest rural localities.
