= Kolotilovo =

Kolotilovo Колотилово
- Village
- Location within Vologda Oblast Location within Russia
- Coordinates: 59°05′N 39°38′E
- Country: Russia
- Region: Vologda Oblast
- District: Vologodsky District

Population
  - Total: 7
- Time zone: UTC+3:00

Kolotilovo (Russian: Колотилово) is a rural locality (a village) in Sosnovskoye Rural Settlement, Vologodsky District, Vologda Oblast, Russia. The population was 7 as of 2002. There is 1 street.

== Geography ==
The distance to Vologda is 61 km, to Novlenskoye is 1 km. Chekshevo, Romanovo, Kurovo, Perkhuryevo, Dmitriyevskoye, Novlenskoye are the nearest rural localities.
