= Krasny Dvor, Cherepovetsky District, Vologda Oblast =

Krasny Dvor Красный Двор
- Village
- Location within Vologda Oblast Location within Russia
- Coordinates: 58°45′N 37°20′E
- Country: Russia
- Region: Vologda Oblast
- District: Cherepovetsky District
- Time zone: UTC+3:00

Krasny Dvor (Russian: Красный Двор) is a rural locality (a village) in Nikolo-Ramenskoye Rural Settlement, Cherepovetsky District, Vologda Oblast, Russia. The population was six, as of 2002. There are two streets.

== Geography ==
Krasny Dvor is located 88 km (55 mi) southwest of Cherepovets (the district's administrative centre) by road. Nikolo-Ramenye is the nearest rural locality.
