= Lavrovo, Cherepovetsky District, Vologda Oblast =

Lavrovo Лаврово
- Village
- Location within Vologda Oblast Location within Russia
- Coordinates: 58°55′N 38°10′E
- Country: Russia
- Region: Vologda Oblast
- District: Cherepovetsky District
- Time zone: UTC+3:00

Lavrovo (Russian: Лаврово) is a rural locality (a village) in Myaksinskoye Rural Settlement, Cherepovetsky District, Vologda Oblast, Russia. The population was 16 as of 2002.

== Geography ==
Lavrovo is located 31 km (19 mi) southeast of Cherepovets (the district's administrative centre) by road. Mikhalevo is the nearest locality. Ur nearest lake, animal in fino-ugorian, Lake of damn
