= Borisovo, Kubenskoye Rural Settlement, Vologodsky District, Vologda Oblast =

Borisovo Борисово
- Village
- Location within Vologda Oblast Location within Russia
- Coordinates: 59°30′N 39°33′E
- Country: Russia
- Region: Vologda Oblast
- District: Vologodsky District
- Time zone: UTC+3:00

Borisovo (Russian: Борисово) is a rural locality (a village) in Kubenskoye Rural Settlement, Vologodsky District, Vologda Oblast, Russia. The population was 304 as of 2002.

== Geography ==
The distance to Vologda is 41 km, to Kubenskoye is 11 km. Posykino, Turutino, Gorka-Nikolskaya, Filisovo, Novoye, Koltsevo are the nearest rural localities.
