= Beloye, Mayskoye Rural Settlement, Vologodsky District, Vologda Oblast =

Beloye Белое
- Village
- Location within Vologda Oblast Location within Russia
- Coordinates: 59°16′N 39°37′E
- Country: Russia
- Region: Vologda Oblast
- District: Vologodsky District
- Time zone: UTC+3:00

Beloye (Russian: Белое) is a rural locality (a village) in Mayskoye Rural Settlement, Vologodsky District, Vologda Oblast, Russia. The population was 1 as of 2002.

== Geography ==
The distance to Vologda is 10km, to Mayskoye is 7 km. Raskopino, Kuleberevo, Maurino, Akulovo, Dityatyevo, Pribytkovo are the nearest villages, creek Kozma.
