= Gorka-Pokrovskaya =

Gorka-Pokrovskaya Горка-Покровская
- Village
- Location within Vologda Oblast Location within Russia
- Coordinates: 59°41′N 39°13′E
- Country: Russia
- Region: Vologda Oblast
- District: Vologodsky District
- Time zone: UTC+3:00

Gorka-Pokrovskaya (Russian: Горка-Покровская) is a rural locality (a village) in Novlenskoye Rural Settlement, Vologodsky District, Vologda Oblast, Russia. The population was 17 as of 2002.

== Geography ==
The distance to Vologda is 73 km, to Novlenskoye is 10 km. Kobelevo, Sazonovo, Anfalovo, Podberezye, Syama, Bereznik are the nearest rural localities.
