= Ilyinskoye, Maysky Selsoviet, Vologodsky District, Vologda Oblast =

Ilyinskoye Ильинское
- Village
- Location within Vologda Oblast Location within Russia
- Coordinates: 59°17′N 39°39′E
- Country: Russia
- Region: Vologda Oblast
- District: Vologodsky District
- Time zone: UTC+3:00

Ilyinskoye (Russian: Ильинское) is a rural locality (a village) in Mayskoye Rural Settlement, Vologodsky District, Vologda Oblast, Russia. The population was 379 as of 2002.

== Geography ==
The distance to Vologda is 18 km, to Maysky is 6 km. Maurino, Myagrino, Mitenskoye, Petrakovo and Skorodumka are the nearest rural localities.
