= Nikolo-Ramenye =

Nikolo-Ramenye Николо-Раменье
- Village
- Location within Vologda Oblast Location within Russia
- Coordinates: 58°48′N 37°22′E
- Country: Russia
- Region: Vologda Oblast
- District: Cherepovetsky District
- Time zone: UTC+3:00

Nikolo-Ramenye (Russian: Николо-Раменье) is a rural locality (a village) and the administrative center of Nikolo-Ramenskoye Rural Settlement, Cherepovetsky District, Vologda Oblast, Russia. The population was 144 as of 2002.

== Geography ==
Nikolo-Ramenye is located 82 km (51 mi) southwest of Cherepovets (the district's administrative centre) by road. Yagnitsa is the nearest rural locality.
