= Verkhneye Anisimovo =

Verkhneye Anisimovo Верхнее Анисимово
- Village
- Location within Vologda Oblast Location within Russia
- Coordinates: 60°35′N 45°35′E
- Country: Russia
- Region: Vologda Oblast
- District: Velikoustyugsky District
- Time zone: UTC+3:00

Verkhneye Anisimovo (Russian: Верхнее Анисимово) is a rural locality (a village) in Opokskoye Rural Settlement, Velikoustyugsky District, Vologda Oblast, Russia. The population was 105 as of 2002.

== Geography ==
Verkhneye Anisimovo is located 54 km southwest of Veliky Ustyug (the district's administrative centre) by road. Nizhneye Anisimovo is the nearest rural locality.
