= Dulovo, Kubenskoye Rural Settlement, Vologodsky District, Vologda Oblast =

Dulovo Дулово
- Village
- Location within Vologda Oblast Location within Russia
- Coordinates: 59°26′N 39°09′E
- Country: Russia
- Region: Vologda Oblast
- District: Vologodsky District
- Time zone: UTC+3:00

Dulovo (Russian: Дулово) is a rural locality (a village) in Kubenskoye Rural Settlement, Vologodsky District, Vologda Oblast, Russia. The population was 17 as of 2002.

== Geography ==
The distance to Vologda is 74 km, to Kubenskoye is 29 km. Demino, Yefimovo, Krivoye, Dolmatovo, Lavrentyevo are the nearest rural localities.
