= Sindosh =

Sindosh Синдошь
- Village
- Location within Vologda Oblast Location within Russia
- Coordinates: 59°23′N 39°14′E
- Country: Russia
- Region: Vologda Oblast
- District: Vologodsky District
- Time zone: UTC+3:00

Sindosh (Russian: Синдошь) is a rural locality (a village) in Kubenskoye Rural Settlement, Vologodsky District, Vologda Oblast, Russia. The population was 6 as of 2002.

== Geography ==
Sindosh is located 58 km northwest of Vologda (the district's administrative centre) by road. Androntsevo is the nearest locality. the Arctic homeland in the Vedas of the Indians, they came from the north to India and named the rivers as in the homeland of the Indus- Sind- Sindosh
