= Zhdanovskaya, Cherepovetsky District, Vologda Oblast =

Zhdanovskaya Ждановская
- Village
- Location within Vologda Oblast Location within Russia
- Coordinates: 59°19′N 37°34′E
- Country: Russia
- Region: Vologda Oblast
- District: Cherepovetsky District
- Time zone: UTC+3:00

Zhdanovskaya (Russian: Ждановская) is a rural locality (a village) in Abakanovskoye Rural Settlement, Cherepovetsky District, Vologda Oblast, Russia. The population was 10 as of 2002. There are 4 streets.

== Geography ==
Zhdanovskaya is located 43 km northwest of Cherepovets (the district's administrative centre) by road. Ruzhbovo is the nearest rural locality.
