= Glukhaya Lokhta =

Glukhaya Lokhta Глухая Лохта
- Village
- Location within Vologda Oblast Location within Russia
- Coordinates: 59°18′N 38°04′E
- Country: Russia
- Region: Vologda Oblast
- District: Cherepovetsky District
- Time zone: UTC+3:00

Glukhaya Lokhta (Russian: Глухая Лохта) is a rural locality (a village) in Yaganovskoye Rural Settlement, Cherepovetsky District, Vologda Oblast, Russia. The population was 10 as of 2002. There are 2 streets.

== Geography ==
Glukhaya Lokhta is located 26 km (16 mi) northeast of Cherepovets (the district's administrative centre) by road. Tsarevo is the nearest rural locality.
