= Grigoryevskoye, Cherepovetsky District, Vologda Oblast =

Grigoryevskoye Григорьевское
- Village
- Location within Vologda Oblast Location within Russia
- Coordinates: 58°48′N 38°21′E
- Country: Russia
- Region: Vologda Oblast
- District: Cherepovetsky District
- Time zone: UTC+3:00

Grigoryevskoye (Russian: Григорьевское) is a rural locality (a village) in Myaksinskoye Rural Settlement, Cherepovetsky District, Vologda Oblast, Russia. The population was 6 as of 2002.

== Geography ==
Grigoryevskoye is located 50 km (31 mi) southeast of Cherepovets (the district's administrative centre) by road. Petrovskoye is the nearest rural locality.
