= Isakovo, Novlenskoye Rural Settlement, Vologodsky District, Vologda Oblast =

Isakovo Исаково
- Village
- Location within Vologda Oblast Location within Russia
- Coordinates: 59°40′N 39°12′E
- Country: Russia
- Region: Vologda Oblast
- District: Vologodsky District
- Time zone: UTC+3:00

Isakovo (Russian: Исаково) is a rural locality (a village) in Novlenskoye Rural Settlement, Vologodsky District, Vologda Oblast, Russia. The population was 2 as of 2002.

== Geography ==
The distance to Vologda is 75 km, to Novlenskoye is 9 km. Avdeyevo, Bubyrevo, Bobelevo, Bryukhachevo are the nearest rural localities.
