= Kolbino, Mayskoye Rural Settlement, Vologodsky District, Vologda Oblast =

Kolbino Колбино
- Village
- Location within Vologda Oblast Location within Russia
- Coordinates: 59°22′N 39°41′E
- Country: Russia
- Region: Vologda Oblast
- District: Vologodsky District
- Time zone: UTC+3:00

Kolbino (Russian: Колбино) is a rural locality (a village) in Mayskoye Rural Settlement, Vologodsky District, Vologda Oblast, Russia. The population was 1 as of 2002.

== Geography ==
The distance to Vologda is 27 km, to Mayskoye is 13 km. Pasynkovo, Belavino, Kolbino, Ivanovskoye, Shatalovo are the nearest rural localities.
