= Novoye Domozerovo =

Novoye Domozerovo Новое Домозерово
- Village
- Location within Vologda Oblast Location within Russia
- Coordinates: 59°02′N 38°08′E
- Country: Russia
- Region: Vologda Oblast
- District: Cherepovetsky District
- Time zone: UTC+3:00

Novoye Domozerovo (Russian: Новое Домозерово) is a rural locality (a village) and the administrative center of Yugskoye Rural Settlement, Cherepovetsky District, Vologda Oblast, Russia. The population was 564 as of 2002. There are 8 streets.

== Geography ==
Novoye Domozerovo is located 23 km (14 mi) southeast of Cherepovets (the district's administrative centre) by road. Burtsevo is the nearest rural locality.
