= Pogorelovo, Sosnovskoye Rural Settlement, Vologodsky District, Vologda Oblast =

Pogorelovo Погорелово
- Village
- Location within Vologda Oblast Location within Russia
- Coordinates: 59°08′N 39°35′E
- Country: Russia
- Region: Vologda Oblast
- District: Vologodsky District
- Time zone: UTC+3:00

Pogorelovo (Russian: Погорелово) is a rural locality (a village) in Sosnovskoye Rural Settlement, Vologodsky District, Vologda Oblast, Russia. The population was 609 as of 2002. There are 7 streets.

== Geography ==
Pogorelovo is located 26 km southwest of Vologda (the district's administrative centre) by road. Lantyevo is the nearest rural locality.
