= Voskresenskoye, Sosnovskoye Rural Settlement, Vologodsky District, Vologda Oblast =

Voskresenskoye Воскресенское
- Village
- Location within Vologda Oblast Location within Russia
- Coordinates: 59°07′N 39°38′E
- Country: Russia
- Region: Vologda Oblast
- District: Vologodsky District
- Time zone: UTC+3:00

Voskresenskoye (Russian: Воскресенское) is a rural locality (a village) in Sosnovskoye Rural Settlement, Vologodsky District, Vologda Oblast, Russia. The population was 3 as of 2002.

== Geography ==
The distance to Vologda is 34.5 km, to Sosnovka is 15 km. Bokovo, Novoye, Levino are the nearest rural localities.
