= Yasnaya Polyana, Vologda Oblast =

Yasnaya Polyana Ясная Поляна
- Village
- Location within Vologda Oblast Location within Russia
- Coordinates: 59°09′N 37°54′E
- Country: Russia
- Region: Vologda Oblast
- District: Cherepovetsky District
- Time zone: UTC+3:00

Yasnaya Polyana (Russian: Ясная Поляна) is a rural locality (a village) in Tonshalovskoye Rural Settlement, Cherepovetsky District, Vologda Oblast, Russia. The population was 760 as of 2002. There are 4 streets.

== Geography ==
Yasnaya Polyana is located 5 km north of Cherepovets (the district's administrative centre) by road. Cherepovets is the nearest rural locality.
