= Antsiferovo, Spasskoye Rural Settlement, Vologodsky District, Vologda Oblast =

Antsiferovo Анциферово
- Village
- Location within Vologda Oblast Location within Russia
- Coordinates: 59°10′N 39°44′E
- Country: Russia
- Region: Vologda Oblast
- District: Vologodsky District
- Time zone: UTC+3:00

Antsiferovo (Russian: Анциферово) is a rural locality (a village) in Spasskoye Rural Settlement, Vologodsky District, Vologda Oblast, Russia. The population was 1 as of 2002.

== Geography ==
The distance to Vologda is 17 km, to Nepotyagovo is 7 km. Yaminovo, Zakryshkino, Rogozkino are the nearest rural localities.
