= Bolshoye Krasnovo =

Bolshoye Krasnovo Большое Красново
- Village
- Location within Vologda Oblast Location within Russia
- Coordinates: 59°26′N 38°08′E
- Country: Russia
- Region: Vologda Oblast
- District: Cherepovetsky District
- Time zone: UTC+3:00

Bolshoye Krasnovo (Russian: Большое Красново) is a rural locality (a village) in Yaganovskoye Rural Settlement, Cherepovetsky District, Vologda Oblast, Russia. The population was 14 as of 2002.

== Geography ==
Bolshoye Krasnovo is located 47 km (29 mi) northeast of Cherepovets (the district's administrative centre) by road. Karelskaya Mushnya is the nearest rural locality.
