= Novaya Derevnya, Cherepovetsky District, Vologda Oblast =

Novaya Derevnya Новая Деревня
- Village
- Location within Vologda Oblast Location within Russia
- Coordinates: 59°00′N 38°28′E
- Country: Russia
- Region: Vologda Oblast
- District: Cherepovetsky District
- Time zone: UTC+3:00

Novaya Derevnya (Russian: Новая Деревня) is a rural locality (a village) in Yugskoye Rural Settlement, Cherepovetsky District, Vologda Oblast, Russia. The population was 11 as of 2002.

== Geography ==
Novaya Derevnya is located 46 km (29 mi) southeast of Cherepovets (the district's administrative centre) by road. Pronino is the nearest rural locality.
