= Voskresenskoye, Kubenskoye Rural Settlement, Vologodsky District, Vologda Oblast =

Voskresenskoye Воскресенское
- Village
- Location within Vologda Oblast Location within Russia
- Coordinates: 59°28′N 39°24′E
- Country: Russia
- Region: Vologda Oblast
- District: Vologodsky District
- Time zone: UTC+3:00

Voskresenskoye (Russian: Воскресенское) is a rural locality (a village) in Kubenskoye Rural Settlement, Vologodsky District, Vologda Oblast, Russia. The population was 18 as of 2002.

== Geography ==
The distance to Vologda is 48 km, to Kubenskoye is 16 km. Bugrino, Prokunino, Filino are the nearest rural localities.
