= Yeremeyevo, Cherepovetsky District, Vologda Oblast =

Yeremeyevo Еремеево
- Village
- Location within Vologda Oblast Location within Russia
- Coordinates: 59°15′N 37°39′E
- Country: Russia
- Region: Vologda Oblast
- District: Cherepovetsky District
- Time zone: UTC+3:00

Yeremeyevo (Russian: Еремеево) is a rural locality (a village) in Abakanovskoye Rural Settlement, Cherepovetsky District, Vologda Oblast, Russia. The population was 1 as of 2002. There are 3 streets.

== Geography ==
Yeremeyevo is located 33 km northwest of Cherepovets (the district's administrative centre) by road. Mikhaylovo is the nearest rural locality.
