= Karelskaya Mushnya =

Karelskaya Mushnya Карельская Мушня
- Village
- Location within Vologda Oblast Location within Russia
- Coordinates: 59°27′N 38°08′E
- Country: Russia
- Region: Vologda Oblast
- District: Cherepovetsky District
- Time zone: UTC+3:00

Karelskaya Mushnya (Russian: Карельская Мушня) is a rural locality (a village) in Yaganovskoye Rural Settlement, Cherepovetsky District, Vologda Oblast, Russia. The population was 28 as of 2002.

== Geography ==
Karelskaya Mushnya is located 47 km (29 mi) north of Cherepovets (the district's administrative centre) by road. Bolshoye Krasnovo is the nearest rural locality.
