= Nizhny Angoboy =

Nizhny Angoboy Нижний Аньгобой
- Village
- Location within Vologda Oblast Location within Russia
- Coordinates: 59°24′N 38°12′E
- Country: Russia
- Region: Vologda Oblast
- District: Cherepovetsky District
- Time zone: UTC+3:00

Nizhny Angoboy (Russian: Нижний Аньгобой) is a rural locality (a village) in Yaganovskoye Rural Settlement, Cherepovetsky District, Vologda Oblast, Russia. The population was 11 as of 2002.

== Geography ==
Nizhny Angoboy is located 46 km (29 mi) northeast of Cherepovets (the district's administrative centre) by road. Verkhny Angoboy is the nearest rural locality.
