= Bolshaya Shormanga =

Bolshaya Shormanga Большая Шорманга
- Selo
- Location within Vologda Oblast Location within Russia
- Coordinates: 59°00′N 38°30′E
- Country: Russia
- Region: Vologda Oblast
- District: Cherepovetsky District
- Time zone: UTC+3:00

Bolshaya Shormanga (Russian: Большая Шорманга) is a rural locality (a selo) in Yugskoye Rural Settlement, Cherepovetsky District, Vologda Oblast, Russia. The population was 9 as of 2002.

== Geography ==
Bolshaya Shormanga is located 48 km (30 mi) southeast of Cherepovets (the district's administrative centre) by road. Novaya Derevnya is the nearest rural locality.
