= Kishkino, Semyonkovskoye Rural Settlement, Vologodsky District, Vologda Oblast =

Kishkino Кишкино
- Village
- Location within Vologda Oblast Location within Russia
- Coordinates: 59°18′N 39°46′E
- Country: Russia
- Region: Vologda Oblast
- District: Vologodsky District
- Time zone: UTC+3:00

Kishkino (Russian: Кишкино) is a rural locality (a village) in Semyonkovskoye Rural Settlement, Vologodsky District, Vologda Oblast, Russia. The population was 2 as of 2002.

== Geography ==
The distance to Vologda is 16 km, to Semyonkovo is 8 km. Molbishcha, Petrakovo, Turbachevo are the nearest rural localities.
