= Maloye Kalinnikovo =

Maloye Kalinnikovo Малое Калинниково
- Village
- Location within Vologda Oblast Location within Russia
- Coordinates: 59°23′N 37°49′E
- Country: Russia
- Region: Vologda Oblast
- District: Cherepovetsky District
- Time zone: UTC+3:00

Maloye Kalinnikovo (Russian: Малое Калинниково) is a rural locality (a village) in Voskresenskoye Rural Settlement, Cherepovetsky District, Vologda Oblast, Russia. The population was 2 as of 2002.

== Geography ==
Maloye Kalinnikovo is located 42 km (26 mi) north of Cherepovets (the district's administrative centre) by road. Tolstikovo is the nearest rural locality.
