= Bolshaya Dubrovka =

Bolshaya Dubrovka Большая Дубровка
- Village
- Location within Vologda Oblast Location within Russia
- Coordinates: 58°47′N 38°24′E
- Country: Russia
- Region: Vologda Oblast
- District: Cherepovetsky District
- Time zone: UTC+3:00

Bolshaya Dubrovka (Russian: Большая Дубровка) is a rural locality (a village) in Myaksinskoye Rural Settlement, Cherepovetsky District, Vologda Oblast, Russia. The population was 16 as of 2002.

== Geography ==
Bolshaya Dubrovka is located 55 km (34 mi) southeast of Cherepovets (the district's administrative centre) by road. Chechino is the nearest rural locality.
