= Bolshaya Novinka =

Bolshaya Novinka Большая Новинка
- Village
- Location within Vologda Oblast Location within Russia
- Coordinates: 58°57′N 38°07′E
- Country: Russia
- Region: Vologda Oblast
- District: Cherepovetsky District
- Time zone: UTC+3:00

Bolshaya Novinka (Russian: Большая Новинка) is a rural locality (a village) in Myaksinskoye Rural Settlement, Cherepovetsky District, Vologda Oblast, Russia. The population was 14 as of 2002. There are 3 streets.

== Geography ==
Bolshaya Novinka is located 26 km (16 mi) southeast of Cherepovets (the district's administrative centre) by road. Maksakovo is the nearest rural locality.
