= Bolshoye Chertishchevo =

Bolshoye Chertishchevo Большое Чертищево
- Village
- Location within Vologda Oblast Location within Russia
- Coordinates: 59°09′N 39°32′E
- Country: Russia
- Region: Vologda Oblast
- District: Vologodsky District
- Time zone: UTC+3:00

Bolshoye Chertishchevo (Russian: Большое Чертищево) is a rural locality (a village) in Sosnovskoye Rural Settlement, Vologodsky District, Vologda Oblast, Russia. The population was 1 as of 2002.

== Geography ==
Bolshoye Chertishchevo is located 27 km southwest of Vologda (the district's administrative centre) by road. Maloye Chertishchevo is the nearest rural locality.
