= Dolgovo, Markovskoye Rural Settlement, Vologodsky District, Vologda Oblast =

Dolgovo Долгово
- Village
- Location within Vologda Oblast Location within Russia
- Coordinates: 59°07′N 40°15′E
- Country: Russia
- Region: Vologda Oblast
- District: Vologodsky District
- Time zone: UTC+3:00

Dolgovo (Russian: Долгово) is a rural locality (a village) in Markovskoye Rural Settlement, Vologodsky District, Vologda Oblast, Russia. The population was 6 as of 2002.

== Geography ==
The distance to Vologda is 30 km, to Vasilyevskoye is 8 km. Glushitsa, Rogachyovo, Ivanovka are the nearest rural localities.
