= Nazarovskaya, Cherepovetsky District, Vologda Oblast =

Nazarovskaya Назаровская
- Village
- Location within Vologda Oblast Location within Russia
- Coordinates: 59°19′N 38°09′E
- Country: Russia
- Region: Vologda Oblast
- District: Cherepovetsky District
- Time zone: UTC+3:00

Nazarovskaya (Russian: Назаровская) is a rural locality (a village) in Yaganovskoye Rural Settlement, Cherepovetsky District, Vologda Oblast, Russia. The population was 8 as of 2002.

== Geography ==
Nazarovskaya is located 35 km (22 mi) northeast of Cherepovets (the district's administrative centre) by road. Yaganovo is the nearest rural locality.
