= Borisovo, Prilukskoye Rural Settlement, Vologodsky District, Vologda Oblast =

Borisovo Борисово
- Village
- Location within Vologda Oblast Location within Russia
- Coordinates: 59°20′N 39°55′E
- Country: Russia
- Region: Vologda Oblast
- District: Vologodsky District
- Time zone: UTC+3:00

Borisovo (Russian: Борисово) is a rural locality (a village) in Prilukskoye Rural Settlement, Vologodsky District, Vologda Oblast, Russia. The population was 3 as of 2002.

== Geography ==
The distance to Vologda is 25 km, to Dorozhnoye is 10 km. Velikoye, Arkhipovo, Mezhdurechye are the nearest rural localities.
