= Gorka-Zarechye =

Gorka-Zarechye Горка-Заречье
- Village
- Location within Vologda Oblast Location within Russia
- Coordinates: 59°23′N 38°00′E
- Country: Russia
- Region: Vologda Oblast
- District: Cherepovetsky District
- Time zone: UTC+3:00

Gorka-Zarechye (Russian: Горка-Заречье) is a rural locality (a village) in Voskresenskoye Rural Settlement, Cherepovetsky District, Vologda Oblast, Russia. The population was 3 as of 2002.

== Geography ==
Gorka-Zarechye is located 38 km (24 mi) northeast of Cherepovets (the district's administrative centre) by road. Bolshoy Dvor is the nearest rural locality.
