= Pogost Dmitriyevsky =

Pogost Dmitriyevsky Погост Дмитриевский
- Village
- Location within Vologda Oblast Location within Russia
- Coordinates: 59°17′N 39°04′E
- Country: Russia
- Region: Vologda Oblast
- District: Vologodsky District
- Time zone: UTC+3:00

Pogost Dmitriyevsky (Russian: Погост Дмитриевский) is a rural locality (a village) in Staroselskoye Rural Settlement, Vologodsky District, Vologda Oblast, Russia. The population was 4 as of 2002.

== Geography ==
Pogost Dmitriyevsky is located 66 km northwest of Vologda (the district's administrative centre) by road. Semyonkovo is the nearest rural locality.
