= Bolshaya Dora =

Bolshaya Dora Большая Дора
- Village
- Location within Vologda Oblast Location within Russia
- Coordinates: 59°04′36″N 37°37′44″E
- Country: Russia
- Region: Vologda Oblast
- District: Cherepovetsky District
- Time zone: UTC+3:00

Bolshaya Dora (Russian: Большая Дора) is a rural locality (a village) in Sudskoye Rural Settlement, Cherepovetsky District, Vologda Oblast, Russia. The population was 55 as of 2002. There are 7 streets.

== Geography ==
Bolshaya Dora is located 47 km (29 mi) southwest of Cherepovets (the district's administrative centre) by road. Malaya Dora is the nearest rural locality.
