= Kharlamovskaya =

Kharlamovskaya Харламовская
- Village
- Location within Vologda Oblast Location within Russia
- Coordinates: 58°48′N 37°12′E
- Country: Russia
- Region: Vologda Oblast
- District: Cherepovetsky District
- Time zone: UTC+3:00

Kharlamovskaya (Russian: Харламовская) is a rural locality (a village) in Nikolo-Ramenskoye Rural Settlement, Cherepovetsky District, Vologda Oblast, Russia. The population was 178 as of 2002. There are 14 streets.

== Geography ==
Kharlamovskaya is located 88 km (55 mi) southwest of Cherepovets (the district's administrative centre) by road. Ruchyi is the nearest rural locality.
