= Maryinskoye, Novlenskoye Rural Settlement, Vologodsky District, Vologda Oblast =

Maryinskoye Марьинское
- Village
- Location within Vologda Oblast Location within Russia
- Coordinates: 59°37′N 39°18′E
- Country: Russia
- Region: Vologda Oblast
- District: Vologodsky District
- Time zone: UTC+3:00

Maryinskoye (Russian: Марьинское) is a rural locality (a village) in Novlenskoye Rural Settlement, Vologodsky District, Vologda Oblast, Russia. The population was 59 as of 2002.

== Geography ==
The distance to Vologda is 62.5 km, to Novlenskoye is 2.5 km. Dmitriyevskoye is the nearest rural locality.
