= Novaya Yagnitsa =

Novaya Yagnitsa Новая Ягница
- Village
- Location within Vologda Oblast Location within Russia
- Coordinates: 58°44′N 37°29′E
- Country: Russia
- Region: Vologda Oblast
- District: Cherepovetsky District
- Time zone: UTC+3:00

Novaya Yagnitsa (Russian: Новая Ягница) is a rural locality (a village) in Yagnitskoye Rural Settlement, Cherepovetsky District, Vologda Oblast, Russia. The population was 19 as of 2002.

== Geography ==
Novaya Yagnitsa is located 98 km (61 mi) southwest of Cherepovets (the district's administrative centre) by road. Yagnitsa is the nearest rural locality.
