= Zaruchevye, Cherepovetsky District, Vologda Oblast =

Zaruchevye Заручевье
- Village
- Location within Vologda Oblast Location within Russia
- Coordinates: 59°17′N 37°40′E
- Country: Russia
- Region: Vologda Oblast
- District: Cherepovetsky District
- Time zone: UTC+3:00

Zaruchevye (Russian: Заручевье) is a rural locality (a village) in Abakanovskoye Rural Settlement, Cherepovetsky District, Vologda Oblast, Russia. The population was 17 as of 2002. There are 3 streets.

== Geography ==
Zaruchevye is located 37 km northwest of Cherepovets (the district's administrative centre) by road. Abakanovo is the nearest rural locality.
