= Mikhalevo, Podlesnoye Rural Settlement, Vologodsky District, Vologda Oblast =

Mikhalevo Михалёво
- Village
- Location within Vologda Oblast Location within Russia
- Coordinates: 59°05′N 39°58′E
- Country: Russia
- Region: Vologda Oblast
- District: Vologodsky District
- Time zone: UTC+3:00

Mikhalevo (Russian: Михалёво) is a rural locality (a village) in Podlesnoye Rural Settlement, Vologodsky District, Vologda Oblast, Russia. The population was 6 as of 2002.

== Geography ==
Mikhalevo is located 18 km southeast of Vologda (the district's administrative centre) by road. Nadeyevo is the nearest rural locality.
