= Vakhrushevo, Staroselsky Selsoviet, Vologodsky District, Vologda Oblast =

Vakhrushevo Вахрушево
- Village
- Location within Vologda Oblast Location within Russia
- Coordinates: 59°09′N 39°08′E
- Country: Russia
- Region: Vologda Oblast
- District: Vologodsky District
- Time zone: UTC+3:00

Vakhrushevo (Russian: Вахрушево) is a rural locality (a village) in Staroselskoye Rural Settlement, Vologodsky District, Vologda Oblast, Russia. The population was 7 as of 2002.

== Geography ==
Vakhrushevo is located 42 km west of Vologda (the district's administrative centre) by road. Romanovo is the nearest rural locality.
