= Zhavoronkovo, Cherepovetsky District, Vologda Oblast =

Zhavoronkovo Жаворонково
- Village
- Location within Vologda Oblast Location within Russia
- Coordinates: 58°58′N 38°27′E
- Country: Russia
- Region: Vologda Oblast
- District: Cherepovetsky District
- Time zone: UTC+3:00

Zhavoronkovo (Russian: Жаворонково) is a rural locality (a village) in Yugskoye Rural Settlement, Cherepovetsky District, Vologda Oblast, Russia. The population was 14 as of 2002.

== Geography ==
Zhavoronkovo is located 46 km southeast of Cherepovets (the district's administrative centre) by road. Piyevo is the nearest rural locality.
