= Andronovo, Veprevsky Selsoviet, Vologodsky District, Vologda Oblast =

Andronovo Андроново
- Village
- Location within Vologda Oblast Location within Russia
- Coordinates: 59°26′N 39°23′E
- Country: Russia
- Region: Vologda Oblast
- District: Vologodsky District
- Time zone: UTC+3:00

Andronovo (Russian: Андроново) is a rural locality (a village) in Kubenskoye Rural Settlement, Vologodsky District, Vologda Oblast, Russia. The population was 11 as of 2002.

== Geography ==
The distance to Vologda is 69 km, to Kubenskoye is 15 km. Ivanovskoye, Virlovo, Kocheurovo are the nearest rural localities.
