= Gorka-Ilyinskaya =

Gorka-Ilyinskaya Горка-Ильинская
- Village
- Location within Vologda Oblast Location within Russia
- Coordinates: 59°38′N 39°13′E
- Country: Russia
- Region: Vologda Oblast
- District: Vologodsky District
- Time zone: UTC+3:00

Gorka-Ilyinskaya (Russian: Горка-Ильинская) is a rural locality (a village) in Novlenskoye Rural Settlement, Vologodsky District, Vologda Oblast, Russia. The population was 8 as of 2002.

== Geography ==
Gorka-Ilyinskaya is located 66 km northwest of Vologda (the district's administrative centre) by road. Gorbovo is the nearest rural locality.
