= Irdomatka =

Irdomatka Ирдоматка
- Village
- Location within Vologda Oblast Location within Russia
- Coordinates: 59°06′N 38°05′E
- Country: Russia
- Region: Vologda Oblast
- District: Cherepovetsky District
- Time zone: UTC+3:00

Irdomatka (Russian: Ирдоматка) is a rural locality (a village) and the administrative center of Irdomatskoye Rural Settlement, Cherepovetsky District, Vologda Oblast, Russia. The population was 1,056 as of 2002. There are 61 streets.

== Geography ==
Irdomatka is located 13 km (8.1 mi) southeast of Cherepovets (the district's administrative centre) by road. Vaneyevo is the nearest rural locality.
