= Myshkino, Cherepovetsky District, Vologda Oblast =

Myshkino Мышкино
- Village
- Location within Vologda Oblast Location within Russia
- Coordinates: 58°43′N 37°20′E
- Country: Russia
- Region: Vologda Oblast
- District: Cherepovetsky District
- Time zone: UTC+3:00

Myshkino (Russian: Мышкино) is a rural locality (a village) in Yagnitskoye Rural Settlement, Cherepovetsky District, Vologda Oblast, Russia. The population was 3 as of 2002. There are 7 streets.

== Geography ==
Myshkino is located 94 km (58 mi) southwest of Cherepovets (the district's administrative centre) by road. Plenishnik is the nearest rural locality.
