= Peryevo, Spasskoye Rural Settlement, Vologodsky District, Vologda Oblast =

Peryevo Перьево
- Settlement
- Location within Vologda Oblast Location within Russia
- Coordinates: 59°02′N 39°46′E
- Country: Russia
- Region: Vologda Oblast
- District: Vologodsky District
- Time zone: UTC+3:00

Peryevo (Russian: Перьево) is a rural locality (a settlement) in Spasskoye Rural Settlement, Vologodsky District, Vologda Oblast, Russia. The population was 718 as of 2002, and there are 22 streets.

== Geography ==
Peryevo is located 22 km southwest of Vologda (the district's administrative centre) by road. Kishkino is the nearest rural locality.
