= Polezhayevo, Cherepovetsky District, Vologda Oblast =

Polezhayevo Полежаево
- Village
- Location within Vologda Oblast Location within Russia
- Coordinates: 58°44′N 38°30′E
- Country: Russia
- Region: Vologda Oblast
- District: Cherepovetsky District
- Time zone: UTC+3:00

Polezhayevo (Russian: Полежаево) is a rural locality (a village) in Myaksinskoye Rural Settlement, Cherepovetsky District, Vologda Oblast, Russia. The population was 3 as of 2002.

== Geography ==
Polezhayevo is located 64 km (40 mi) southeast of Cherepovets (the district's administrative centre) by road. Kornigovka is the nearest rural locality.
