= Maryinskoye, Semyonkovskoye Rural Settlement, Vologodsky District, Vologda Oblast =

Maryinskoye Марьинское
- Village
- Location within Vologda Oblast Location within Russia
- Coordinates: 59°16′N 39°48′E
- Country: Russia
- Region: Vologda Oblast
- District: Vologodsky District
- Time zone: UTC+3:00

Maryinskoye (Russian: Марьинское) is a rural locality (a village) in Semyonkovskoye Rural Settlement, Vologodsky District, Vologda Oblast, Russia. The population was 59 as of 2002.

== Geography ==
The distance to Vologda is 12 km, to Semyonkovo is 4 km. Podberevskoye is the nearest rural locality.
