= Ploskovo, Cherepovetsky District, Vologda Oblast =

Ploskovo Плосково
- Village
- Location within Vologda Oblast Location within Russia
- Coordinates: 58°36′N 37°25′E
- Country: Russia
- Region: Vologda Oblast
- District: Cherepovetsky District
- Time zone: UTC+3:00

Ploskovo (Russian: Плосково) is a rural locality (a village) in Yagnitskoye Rural Settlement, Cherepovetsky District, Vologda Oblast, Russia. The population was 107 as of 2002. There are five streets.

== Geography ==
Ploskovo is located 113 km (70 mi) southwest of Cherepovets (the district's administrative centre) by road. Ramenye is the nearest rural locality.
