= Prokunino, Staroselskoye Rural Settlement, Vologodsky District, Vologda Oblast =

Prokunino Прокунино
- Village
- Location within Vologda Oblast Location within Russia
- Coordinates: 59°29′N 39°23′E
- Country: Russia
- Region: Vologda Oblast
- District: Vologodsky District
- Time zone: UTC+3:00

Prokunino (Russian: Прокунино) is a rural locality (a village) in Staroselskoye Rural Settlement, Vologodsky District, Vologda Oblast, Russia. The population was 1 as of 2002.

== Geography ==
Prokunino is located 65 km northwest of Vologda (the district's administrative centre) by road. Pogost Dmitriyevsky is the nearest rural locality.
