= Seltso-Ryabovo =

Seltso-Ryabovo Сельцо-Рябово
- Village
- Location within Vologda Oblast Location within Russia
- Coordinates: 58°56′N 38°26′E
- Country: Russia
- Region: Vologda Oblast
- District: Cherepovetsky District
- Time zone: UTC+3:00

Seltso-Ryabovo (Russian: Сельцо-Рябово) is a rural locality (a village) in Yugskoye Rural Settlement, Cherepovetsky District, Vologda Oblast, Russia. The population was 5 as of 2002.

== Geography ==
Seltso-Ryabovo is located 46 km southeast of Cherepovets (the district's administrative centre) by road. Ryabovo is the nearest rural locality.
