= Bolshoy Dvor, Vologodsky District, Vologda Oblast =

Bolshoy Dvor Большой Двор
- Village
- Location within Vologda Oblast Location within Russia
- Coordinates: 59°25′N 38°58′E
- Country: Russia
- Region: Vologda Oblast
- District: Vologodsky District
- Time zone: UTC+3:00

Bolshoy Dvor (Russian: Большой Двор) is a rural locality (a village) in Kubenskoye Rural Settlement, Vologodsky District, Vologda Oblast, Russia. The population was 4 as of 2002.

== Geography ==
Bolshoy Dvor is located 73 km northwest of Vologda (the district's administrative centre) by road. Dekteri is the nearest rural locality.
