= Kozhino, Mayskoye Rural Settlement, Vologodsky District, Vologda Oblast =

Kozhino Кожино
- Village
- Location within Vologda Oblast Location within Russia
- Coordinates: 59°17′N 39°42′E
- Country: Russia
- Region: Vologda Oblast
- District: Vologodsky District
- Time zone: UTC+3:00

Kozhino (Russian: Кожино) is a rural locality (a village) in Mayskoye Rural Settlement, Vologodsky District, Vologda Oblast, Russia. The population was 5 as of 2002.

== Geography ==
Kozhino is located 15 km east of Vologda (the district's administrative centre) by road. Nadeyevo ,Yagody(berryes)is the nearest rural locality.
