= Malaya Shormanga =

Malaya Shormanga Малая Шорманга
- Village
- Location within Vologda Oblast Location within Russia
- Coordinates: 58°59′N 38°31′E
- Country: Russia
- Region: Vologda Oblast
- District: Cherepovetsky District
- Time zone: UTC+3:00

Malaya Shormanga (Russian: Малая Шорманга) is a rural locality (a village) in Yugskoye Rural Settlement, Cherepovetsky District, Vologda Oblast, Russia. The population was 9 as of 2002.

== Geography ==
Malaya Shormanga is located 50 km (31 mi) southeast of Cherepovets (the district's administrative centre) by road. Bolshaya Shormanga is the nearest rural locality.
