= Maryinskaya, Cherepovetsky District, Vologda Oblast =

Maryinskaya Марьинская
- Village
- Location within Vologda Oblast Location within Russia
- Coordinates: 59°19′N 37°54′E
- Country: Russia
- Region: Vologda Oblast
- District: Cherepovetsky District
- Time zone: UTC+3:00

Maryinskaya (Russian: Марьинская) is a rural locality (a village) in Yargomzhskoye Rural Settlement, Cherepovetsky District, Vologda Oblast, Russia. The population was 14 as of 2002.

== Geography ==
Maryinskaya is located 30 km (19 mi) north of Cherepovets (the district's administrative centre) by road. Slobodino is the nearest rural locality.
