= Muravyovo, Cherepovetsky District, Vologda Oblast =

Muravyovo Муравьёво
- Village
- Location within Vologda Oblast Location within Russia
- Coordinates: 58°42′N 37°57′E
- Country: Russia
- Region: Vologda Oblast
- District: Cherepovetsky District
- Time zone: UTC+3:00

Muravyovo (Russian: Муравьёво) is a rural locality (a village) in Yagnitskoye Rural Settlement, Cherepovetsky District, Vologda Oblast, Russia. The population was 2 as of 2002.

== Geography ==
Muravyovo is located 124 km (77 mi) south of Cherepovets (the district's administrative centre) by road. Mikhalkovo is the nearest rural locality.
