= Tolstikovo, Cherepovetsky District, Vologda Oblast =

Tolstikovo Толстиково
- Village
- Location within Vologda Oblast Location within Russia
- Coordinates: 59°24′N 37°51′E
- Country: Russia
- Region: Vologda Oblast
- District: Cherepovetsky District
- Time zone: UTC+3:00

Tolstikovo (Russian: Толстиково) is a rural locality (a village) in Voskresenskoye Rural Settlement, Cherepovetsky District, Vologda Oblast, Russia. The population was 5 as of 2002.

== Geography ==
Tolstikovo is located 39 km north of Cherepovets (the district's administrative centre) by road. Maloye Kalinnikovo is the nearest rural locality.
