= Dorofeyevo, Vologda Oblast =

Dorofeyevo Дорофеево
- Village
- Location within Vologda Oblast Location within Russia
- Coordinates: 58°50′N 38°17′E
- Country: Russia
- Region: Vologda Oblast
- District: Cherepovetsky District
- Time zone: UTC+3:00

Dorofeyevo (Russian: Дорофеево) is a rural locality (a village) in Myaksinskoye Rural Settlement, Cherepovetsky District, Vologda Oblast, Russia. The population was 10 as of 2002.

== Geography ==
By road, Dorofeyevo is located 43 km (27 mi) southeast of Cherepovets (the district's administrative centre). Dyakonovo is the nearest rural locality.
