= Grigoryevo, Cherepovetsky District, Vologda Oblast =

Grigoryevo Григорьево
- Village
- Location within Vologda Oblast Location within Russia
- Coordinates: 58°54′N 38°12′E
- Country: Russia
- Region: Vologda Oblast
- District: Cherepovetsky District
- Time zone: UTC+3:00

Grigoryevo (Russian: Григорьево) is a rural locality (a village) in Yagnitskoye Rural Settlement, Cherepovetsky District, Vologda Oblast, Russia. The population was 20 as of 2002.

== Geography ==
Grigoryevo is located 108 km (67 mi) south of Cherepovets (the district's administrative centre) by road. Ionovo is the nearest rural locality.
