= Matveyevskoye, Novlenskoye Rural Settlement, Vologodsky District, Vologda Oblast =

Matveyevskoye Матвеевское
- Village
- Location within Vologda Oblast Location within Russia
- Coordinates: 59°46′N 39°02′E
- Country: Russia
- Region: Vologda Oblast
- District: Vologodsky District
- Time zone: UTC+3:00

Matveyevskoye (Russian: Матвеевское) is a rural locality (a village) in Novlenskoye Rural Settlement, Vologodsky District, Vologda Oblast, Russia. The population was 14 as of 2002.

== Geography ==
The distance to Vologda is 84 km, to Novlenskoye is 24 km. Malgino is the nearest rural locality.
