= Novoye Zakharovo =

Novoye Zakharovo Новое Захарово
- Village
- Location within Vologda Oblast Location within Russia
- Coordinates: 59°30′N 37°57′E
- Country: Russia
- Region: Vologda Oblast
- District: Cherepovetsky District
- Time zone: UTC+3:00

Novoye Zakharovo (Russian: Новое Захарово) is a rural locality (a village) in Voskresenskoye Rural Settlement, Cherepovetsky District, Vologda Oblast, Russia. The population was 2 as of 2002.

== Geography ==
Novoye Zakharovo is located 50 km (31 mi) northeast of Cherepovets (the district's administrative centre) by road. Zaosechye is the nearest rural locality.
