= Sredniye Chudi =

Sredniye Chudi Средние Чуди
- Village
- Location within Vologda Oblast Location within Russia
- Coordinates: 58°47′N 37°26′E
- Country: Russia
- Region: Vologda Oblast
- District: Cherepovetsky District
- Time zone: UTC+3:00

Sredniye Chudi (Russian: Средние Чуди) is a rural locality (a village) in Nikolo-Ramenskoye Rural Settlement, Cherepovetsky District, Vologda Oblast, Russia. The population was 21 as of 2002.

== Geography ==
Sredniye Chudi is located 87 km southwest of Cherepovets (the district's administrative centre) by road. Nikolo-Ramenye is the nearest rural locality.
