= Verhny Angoboy =

Verhny Angoboy Верхний Аньгобой
- Village
- Location within Vologda Oblast Location within Russia
- Coordinates: 59°23′N 38°11′E
- Country: Russia
- Region: Vologda Oblast
- District: Cherepovetsky District
- Time zone: UTC+3:00

Verhny Angoboy (Russian: Верхний Аньгобой) is a rural locality (a village) in Yaganovskoye Rural Settlement, Cherepovetsky District, Vologda Oblast, Russia. The population was 4 as of 2002.

== Geography ==
Verhny Angoboy is located 43 km northeast of Cherepovets (the district's administrative centre) by road. Nizhny Angoboy is the nearest rural locality.
