= Fetinino, Vologodsky District, Vologda Oblast =

Fetinino Фетинино
- Village
- Location within Vologda Oblast Location within Russia
- Coordinates: 59°21′N 39°46′E
- Country: Russia
- Region: Vologda Oblast
- District: Vologodsky District
- Time zone: UTC+3:00

Fetinino (Russian: Фетинино) is a rural locality (a village) in Semyonkovskoye Rural Settlement, Vologodsky District, Vologda Oblast, Russia. The population was 742 as of 2002. There are 6 streets.

== Geography ==
Fetinino is located 19 km (12 mi) northwest of Vologda (the district's administrative centre) by road. Yakovlevskoye is the nearest rural locality.
