= Maloye Chertishchevo =

Maloye Chertishchevo Малое Чертищево
- Village
- Location within Vologda Oblast Location within Russia
- Coordinates: 59°09′N 39°33′E
- Country: Russia
- Region: Vologda Oblast
- District: Vologodsky District
- Time zone: UTC+3:00

Maloye Chertishchevo (Russian: Малое Чертищево) is a rural locality (a village) in Sosnovskoye Rural Settlement, Vologodsky District, Vologda Oblast, Russia. The population was 2 as of 2002.

== Geography ==
Maloye Chertishchevo is located 26 km west of Vologda (the district's administrative centre) by road. Bolshoye Chertishchevo is the nearest rural locality.
