= Moseyev Pochinok =

Moseyev Pochinok Мосеев Починок
- Village
- Location within Vologda Oblast Location within Russia
- Coordinates: 60°43′N 46°04′E
- Country: Russia
- Region: Vologda Oblast
- District: Velikoustyugsky District
- Time zone: UTC+3:00

Moseyev Pochinok (Russian: Мосеев Починок) is a rural locality (a village) in Mardengskoye Rural Settlement, Velikoustyugsky District, Vologda Oblast, Russia. The population was 4 as of 2002.

== Geography ==
Moseyev Pochinok is located 18 km southwest of Veliky Ustyug (the district's administrative centre) by road. Teltevo is the nearest rural locality.
