= Prokshino, Cherepovetsky District, Vologda Oblast =

Prokshino Прокшино
- Village
- Location within Vologda Oblast Location within Russia
- Coordinates: 59°39′N 38°04′E
- Country: Russia
- Region: Vologda Oblast
- District: Cherepovetsky District
- Time zone: UTC+3:00

Prokshino (Russian: Прокшино) is a rural locality (a village) in Voskresenskoye Rural Settlement, Cherepovetsky District, Vologda Oblast, Russia. The population was 3 as of 2002.

== Geography ==
Prokshino is located 70 km (43 mi) northeast of Cherepovets (the district's administrative centre) by road. Panteleymonovskoye is the nearest rural locality.
