= Rubtsovo, Vologodsky District, Vologda Oblast =

Rubtsovo Рубцово
- Settlement
- Location within Vologda Oblast Location within Russia
- Coordinates: 59°12′N 39°47′E
- Country: Russia
- Region: Vologda Oblast
- District: Vologodsky District
- Time zone: UTC+3:00

Rubtsovo (Russian: Рубцово) is a rural locality (a settlement) in Leskovskoye Rural Settlement, Vologodsky District, Vologda Oblast, Russia. The population was 228 as of 2002. There are 3 streets.

== Geography ==
Rubtsovo is located 8 km west of Vologda (the district's administrative centre) by road. Vatlanovo is the nearest rural locality.
