= Ruzhbovo =

Ruzhbovo Ружбово
- Village
- Location within Vologda Oblast Location within Russia
- Coordinates: 59°19′N 37°35′E
- Country: Russia
- Region: Vologda Oblast
- District: Cherepovetsky District
- Time zone: UTC+3:00

Ruzhbovo (Russian: Ружбово) is a rural locality (a village) in Abakanovskoye Rural Settlement, Cherepovetsky District, Vologda Oblast, Russia. The population was 4 as of 2002. There are 3 streets.

== Geography ==
Ruzhbovo is located 41 km (25 mi) northwest of Cherepovets (the district's administrative centre) by road. Zhdanovskaya is the nearest rural locality.
