= Semyonovskoye, Podlesnoy Selsoviet, Vologodsky District, Vologda Oblast =

Semyonovskoye Семёновское
- Village
- Location within Vologda Oblast Location within Russia
- Coordinates: 59°04′N 40°00′E
- Country: Russia
- Region: Vologda Oblast
- District: Vologodsky District
- Time zone: UTC+3:00

Semyonovskoye (Russian: Семёновское) is a rural locality (a village) in Podlesnoye Rural Settlement, Vologodsky District, Vologda Oblast, Russia. The population was 4 as of 2002.

== Geography ==
The distance to Vologda is 28 km, to Ogarkovo is 15 km. Melnikovo is the nearest rural locality.
