= Dulepovo =

Dulepovo Дулепово
- Village
- Location within Vologda Oblast Location within Russia
- Coordinates: 59°17′N 39°35′E
- Country: Russia
- Region: Vologda Oblast
- District: Vologodsky District
- Time zone: UTC+3:00

Dulepovo (Russian: Дулепово) is a rural locality (a village) in Mayskoye Rural Settlement, Vologodsky District, Vologda Oblast, Russia. The population was 60 as of 2002. There are 4 streets.

== Geography ==
Dulepovo is located 21 km northwest of Vologda (the district's administrative centre) by road. Pailovo is the nearest locality. Creek Mesha Расстояние от Дулепова до Вологды 12 km
