= Kunovo, Vologda Oblast =

Kunovo Куново
- Village
- Location within Vologda Oblast Location within Russia
- Coordinates: 59°24′N 38°58′E
- Country: Russia
- Region: Vologda Oblast
- District: Vologodsky District
- Time zone: UTC+3:00

Kunovo (Russian: Куново) is a rural locality (a village) in Kubenskoye Rural Settlement, Vologodsky District, Vologda Oblast, Russia. The population was 8 as of 2002.

== Geography ==
Kunovo is located 73 km northwest of Vologda (the district's administrative centre) by road. Dekteri is the nearest rural locality. it is named because of the monetary unit of kuna Rus of the 13th century and modern Croatia
