= Malechkino =

Malechkino Малечкино
- Settlement
- Location within Vologda Oblast Location within Russia
- Coordinates: 59°12′N 37°51′E
- Country: Russia
- Region: Vologda Oblast
- District: Cherepovetsky District
- Time zone: UTC+3:00

Malechkino (Russian: Малечкино) is a rural locality (a settlement) and the administrative center of Malechkinskoye Rural Settlement, Cherepovetsky District, Vologda Oblast, Russia. The population was 2,200 as of 2002. There are 10 streets.

== Geography ==
Malechkino is located 16 km (9.9 mi) northwest of Cherepovets (the district's administrative centre) by road. Kurilovo is the nearest rural locality.
