= Mitenskoye, Cherepovetsky District, Vologda Oblast =

Mitenskoye Митенское
- Village
- Location within Vologda Oblast Location within Russia
- Coordinates: 59°17′N 38°10′E
- Country: Russia
- Region: Vologda Oblast
- District: Cherepovetsky District
- Time zone: UTC+3:00

Mitenskoye (Russian: Митенское) is a rural locality (a village) in Yaganovskoye Rural Settlement, Cherepovetsky District, Vologda Oblast, Russia. The population was 7 as of 2002.

== Geography ==
Mitenskoye is located 31 km (19 mi) northeast of Cherepovets (the district's administrative centre) by road. Dor is the nearest rural locality.
