= Novaya Svobodka =

Novaya Svobodka Новая Свободка
- Village
- Location within Vologda Oblast Location within Russia
- Coordinates: 58°50′N 38°16′E
- Country: Russia
- Region: Vologda Oblast
- District: Cherepovetsky District
- Time zone: UTC+3:00

Novaya Svobodka (Russian: Новая Свободка) is a rural locality (a village) in Myaksinskoye Rural Settlement, Cherepovetsky District, Vologda Oblast, Russia. The population was 1 as of 2002.

== Geography ==
Novaya Svobodka is located 43 km (27 mi) southeast of Cherepovets (the district's administrative centre) by road. Lysaya Gora is the nearest rural locality.
