= Staroye Domozerovo =

Staroye Domozerovo Старое Домозерово
- Village
- Location within Vologda Oblast Location within Russia
- Coordinates: 59°02′N 38°10′E
- Country: Russia
- Region: Vologda Oblast
- District: Cherepovetsky District
- Time zone: UTC+3:00

Staroye Domozerovo (Russian: Старое Домозерово) is a rural locality (a village) in Yugskoye Rural Settlement, Cherepovetsky District, Vologda Oblast, Russia. The population was 3 as of 2002.

== Geography ==
Staroye Domozerovo is located 26 km southeast of Cherepovets (the district's administrative centre) by road. Novoye Domozerovo is the nearest rural locality.
