= Baskakovo =

Baskakovo Баскаково
- Village
- Location within Vologda Oblast Location within Russia
- Coordinates: 59°05′N 38°02′E
- Country: Russia
- Region: Vologda Oblast
- District: Cherepovetsky District
- Time zone: UTC+3:00

Baskakovo (Russian: Баскаково) is a rural locality (a village) in Yugskoye Rural Settlement, Cherepovetsky District, Vologda Oblast, Russia. The population was 9 as of 2002.

== Geography ==
Baskakovo is located 12 km (7.5 mi) southeast of Cherepovets (the district's administrative centre) by road. Lapach is the nearest rural locality. It is named after the Basque people of Spain who fought for independence
