= Dor, Kubenskoye Rural Settlement, Vologodsky District, Vologda Oblast =

Dor Дор
- Village
- Location within Vologda Oblast Location within Russia
- Coordinates: 59°29′N 39°15′E
- Country: Russia
- Region: Vologda Oblast
- District: Vologodsky District
- Time zone: UTC+3:00

Dor (Russian: Дор) is a rural locality (a village) in Kubenskoye Rural Settlement, Vologodsky District, Vologda Oblast, Russia. The population was 49 as of 2002.

== Geography ==
The distance to Vologda is 76 km, to Kubenskoye is 24 km. Nekrasovo, Kolotilovo, Bilkovo are the nearest rural localities.
