= Kiselevo, Cherepovetsky District, Vologda Oblast =

Kiselevo Киселево
- Village
- Location within Vologda Oblast Location within Russia
- Coordinates: 59°15′N 37°49′E
- Country: Russia
- Region: Vologda Oblast
- District: Cherepovetsky District
- Time zone: UTC+3:00

Kiselevo (Russian: Киселево) is a rural locality (a village) in Malechkinskoye Rural Settlement, Cherepovetsky District, Vologda Oblast, Russia. The population was 12 as of 2002.

== Geography ==
Kiselevo is located 22 km (14 mi) northwest of Cherepovets (the district's administrative centre) by road. Leontyevo is the nearest rural locality.
