= Kostenevo, Cherepovetsky District, Vologda Oblast =

Kostenevo Костенево
- Village
- Location within Vologda Oblast Location within Russia
- Coordinates: 59°23′N 38°09′E
- Country: Russia
- Region: Vologda Oblast
- District: Cherepovetsky District
- Time zone: UTC+3:00

Kostenevo (Russian: Костенево) is a rural locality (a village) in Yaganovskoye Rural Settlement, Cherepovetsky District, Vologda Oblast, Russia. The population was 37 as of 2002.

== Geography ==
Kostenevo is located 40 km (25 mi) northeast of Cherepovets (the district's administrative centre) by road. Sokolovo is the nearest rural locality.
