= Malye Strazhi =

Malye Strazhi Малые Стражи
- Village
- Location within Vologda Oblast Location within Russia
- Coordinates: 59°20′N 38°11′E
- Country: Russia
- Region: Vologda Oblast
- District: Cherepovetsky District
- Time zone: UTC+3:00

Malye Strazhi (Russian: Малые Стражи) is a rural locality (a village) in Yaganovskoye Rural Settlement, Cherepovetsky District, Vologda Oblast, Russia. The population was 6 as of 2002.

== Geography ==
Malye Strazhi is located 38 km (24 mi) northeast of Cherepovets (the district's administrative centre) by road. Bolshiye Strazhi is the nearest rural locality.
