= Mikhalevo, Novlenskoye Rural Settlement, Vologodsky District, Vologda Oblast =

Mikhalevo Михалёво
- Village
- Location within Vologda Oblast Location within Russia
- Coordinates: 59°41′N 38°54′E
- Country: Russia
- Region: Vologda Oblast
- District: Vologodsky District
- Time zone: UTC+3:00

Mikhalevo (Russian: Михалёво) is a rural locality (a village) in Novlenskoye Rural Settlement, Vologodsky District, Vologda Oblast, Russia. The population was 6 as of 2002.

== Geography ==
The distance to Vologda is 96 km, to Novlenskoye is 25 km. Shavrovo is the nearest rural locality.
