= Nosovskoye =

Nosovskoye Носовское
- Selo
- Location within Vologda Oblast Location within Russia
- Coordinates: 59°10′N 37°54′E
- Country: Russia
- Region: Vologda Oblast
- District: Cherepovetsky District
- Time zone: UTC+3:00

Nosovskoye (Russian: Носовское) is a rural locality (a selo) in Tonshalovskoye Rural Settlement, Cherepovetsky District, Vologda Oblast, Russia. The population was 40 as of 2002. There are 2 streets.

== Geography ==
Nosovskoye is located 11 km (6.8 mi) north of Cherepovets (the district's administrative centre) by road. Bolshoy Dvor is the nearest rural locality.
