= Petrakovo, Novlenskoye Rural Settlement, Vologodsky District, Vologda Oblast =

Petrakovo Петраково
- Village
- Location within Vologda Oblast Location within Russia
- Coordinates: 59°29′N 38°55′E
- Country: Russia
- Region: Vologda Oblast
- District: Vologodsky District
- Time zone: UTC+3:00

Petrakovo (Russian: Петраково) is a rural locality (a village) in Novlenskoye Rural Settlement, Vologodsky District, Vologda Oblast, Russia. The population was 11 as of 2002.

== Geography ==
Petrakovo is located 87 km northwest of Vologda (the district's administrative centre) by road. Yarunovo is the nearest rural locality.
