= Vasyukovo, Cherepovetsky District, Vologda Oblast =

Vasyukovo Васюково
- Village
- Location within Vologda Oblast Location within Russia
- Coordinates: 58°42′N 37°44′E
- Country: Russia
- Region: Vologda Oblast
- District: Cherepovetsky District
- Time zone: UTC+3:00

Vasyukovo (Russian: Васюково) is a rural locality (a village) in Yagnitskoye Rural Settlement, Cherepovetsky District, Vologda Oblast, Russia. The population was 21 as of 2002.

== Geography ==
Vasyukovo is located 107 km south of Cherepovets (the district's administrative centre) by road. Bolshoy Dvor is the nearest rural locality.
