= Zhavoronkovo, Vologodsky District, Vologda Oblast =

Zhavoronkovo Жаворонково
- Village
- Location within Vologda Oblast Location within Russia
- Coordinates: 59°09′N 39°27′E
- Country: Russia
- Region: Vologda Oblast
- District: Vologodsky District
- Time zone: UTC+3:00

Zhavoronkovo (Russian: Жаворонково) is a rural locality (a village) in Staroselskoye Rural Settlement, Vologodsky District, Vologda Oblast, Russia. The population was 6 as of 2002.

== Geography ==
Zhavoronkovo is located 27 km southwest of Vologda (the district's administrative centre) by road. Ananyino is the nearest rural locality.
