= Anfalovo, Cherepovetsky District, Vologda Oblast =

Anfalovo Анфалово
- Village
- Location within Vologda Oblast Location within Russia
- Coordinates: 58°58′N 37°27′E
- Country: Russia
- Region: Vologda Oblast
- District: Cherepovetsky District
- Time zone: UTC+3:00

Anfalovo (Russian: Анфалово) is a rural locality (a village) in Korotovskoye Rural Settlement, Cherepovetsky District, Vologda Oblast, Russia. The population was 14 as of 2002.

== Geography ==
Anfalovo is located 62 km (39 mi) southwest of Cherepovets (the district's administrative centre) by road. Parshino is the nearest rural locality.
