= Gorely Pochinok =

Gorely Pochinok Горелый Починок
- Village
- Location within Vologda Oblast Location within Russia
- Coordinates: 59°31′N 37°24′E
- Country: Russia
- Region: Vologda Oblast
- District: Cherepovetsky District
- Time zone: UTC+3:00

Gorely Pochinok (Russian: Горелый Починок) is a rural locality (a village) in Voskresenskoye Rural Settlement, Cherepovetsky District, Vologda Oblast, Russia. The population was 38 as of 2002.

== Geography ==
Gorely Pochinok is located 71 km (44 mi) northwest of Cherepovets (the district's administrative centre) by road. Ivanovo is the nearest rural locality.
