= Khlamovo, Cherepovetsky District, Vologda Oblast =

Khlamovo Хламово
- Village
- Location within Vologda Oblast Location within Russia
- Coordinates: 58°53′N 38°13′E
- Country: Russia
- Region: Vologda Oblast
- District: Cherepovetsky District
- Time zone: UTC+3:00

Khlamovo (Russian: Хламово) is a rural locality (a village) in Myaksinskoye Rural Settlement, Cherepovetsky District, Vologda Oblast, Russia. The population was 11 as of 2002.

== Geography ==
Khlamovo is located 36 km (22 mi) southeast of Cherepovets (the district's administrative centre) by road. Myaksa is the nearest rural locality.
