= Kraskovo, Cherepovetsky District, Vologda Oblast =

Kraskovo Красково
- Village
- Location within Vologda Oblast Location within Russia
- Coordinates: 59°35′N 37°29′E
- Country: Russia
- Region: Vologda Oblast
- District: Cherepovetsky District
- Time zone: UTC+3:00

Kraskovo (Russian: Красково) is a rural locality (a village) in Voskresenskoye Rural Settlement, Cherepovetsky District, Vologda Oblast, Russia. The population was 5 as of 2002.

== Geography ==
Kraskovo is located 77 km (48 mi) northwest of Cherepovets (the district's administrative centre) by road. Novodubrovka is the nearest rural locality.
