= Maslozavod, Novlenskoye Rural Settlement, Vologodsky District, Vologda Oblast =

Maslozavod Маслозавод
- Village
- Location within Vologda Oblast Location within Russia
- Coordinates: 59°33′N 39°08′E
- Country: Russia
- Region: Vologda Oblast
- District: Vologodsky District
- Time zone: UTC+3:00

Maslozavod (Russian: Маслозавод) is a rural locality (a village) in Novlenskoye Rural Settlement, Vologodsky District, Vologda Oblast, Russia. The population was 11 as of 2002.

== Geography ==
The distance to Vologda is 76 km, to Novlenskoye is 13 km. Mitropolye is the nearest rural locality.
