= Mitenskoye, Novlenskoye Rural Settlement, Vologodsky District, Vologda Oblast =

Mitenskoye Митенское
- Village
- Location within Vologda Oblast Location within Russia
- Coordinates: 59°42′N 39°11′E
- Country: Russia
- Region: Vologda Oblast
- District: Vologodsky District
- Time zone: UTC+3:00

Mitenskoye (Russian: Митенское) is a rural locality (a village) in Novlenskoye Rural Settlement, Vologodsky District, Vologda Oblast, Russia. The population was 5 as of 2002.

== Geography ==
The distance to Vologda is 73 km, to Novlenskoye is 13 km. Gridenskoye is the nearest rural locality.
