= Myaksa =

Myaksa Мякса
- Selo
- Location within Vologda Oblast Location within Russia
- Coordinates: 58°53′N 38°11′E
- Country: Russia
- Region: Vologda Oblast
- District: Cherepovetsky District
- Time zone: UTC+3:00

Myaksa (Russian: Мякса) is a rural locality (a selo) and the administrative center of Myaksinskoye Rural Settlement, Cherepovetsky District, Vologda Oblast, Russia. The population was 1,143 as of 2002. There are 21 streets.

== Geography ==
Myaksa is located 35 km (22 mi) southeast of Cherepovets (the district's administrative centre) by road. Voshchazhnikovo is the nearest rural locality.
