= Neverov Bor =

Neverov Bor Неверов Бор
- Settlement
- Location within Vologda Oblast Location within Russia
- Coordinates: 59°07′N 37°37′E
- Country: Russia
- Region: Vologda Oblast
- District: Cherepovetsky District
- Time zone: UTC+3:00

Neverov Bor (Russian: Неверов Бор) is a rural locality (a settlement) in Sudskoye Rural Settlement, Cherepovetsky District, Vologda Oblast, Russia. The population was 184 as of 2002. There are 4 streets.

== Geography ==
Neverov Bor is located 45 km (28 mi) west of Cherepovets (the district's administrative centre) by road. Leontyevka is the nearest rural locality.
