= Pakhotino, Cherepovetsky District, Vologda Oblast =

Pakhotino Пахотино
- Village
- Location within Vologda Oblast Location within Russia
- Coordinates: 59°36′N 37°39′E
- Country: Russia
- Region: Vologda Oblast
- District: Cherepovetsky District
- Time zone: UTC+3:00

Pakhotino (Russian: Пахотино) is a rural locality (a village) in Voskresenskoye Rural Settlement, Cherepovetsky District, Vologda Oblast, Russia. The population was 14 as of 2002.

== Geography ==
Pakhotino is located 68 km (42 mi) northwest of Cherepovets (the district's administrative centre) by road. Annino is the nearest rural locality.
