= Parshino, Cherepovetsky District, Vologda Oblast =

Parshino Паршино
- Village
- Location within Vologda Oblast Location within Russia
- Coordinates: 58°58′N 37°28′E
- Country: Russia
- Region: Vologda Oblast
- District: Cherepovetsky District
- Time zone: UTC+3:00

Parshino (Russian: Паршино) is a rural locality (a village) in Korotovskoye Rural Settlement, Cherepovetsky District, Vologda Oblast, Russia. The population was 17 as of 2002. There are 2 streets.

== Geography ==
Parshino is located 63 km (39 mi) southwest of Cherepovets (the district's administrative centre) by road. Anfalovo is the nearest rural locality.
