= Petrakovo, Cherepovetsky District, Vologda Oblast =

Petrakovo Петраково
- Village
- Location within Vologda Oblast Location within Russia
- Coordinates: 59°03′N 38°01′E
- Country: Russia
- Region: Vologda Oblast
- District: Cherepovetsky District
- Time zone: UTC+3:00

Petrakovo (Russian: Петраково) is a rural locality (a village) in Yugskoye Rural Settlement, Cherepovetsky District, Vologda Oblast, Russia. The population was 25 as of 2002.

== Geography ==
Petrakovo is located 15 km (9.3 mi) southeast of Cherepovets (the district's administrative centre) by road. Blinovo is the nearest rural locality.
