= Soyvolovskaya =

Soyvolovskaya Сойволовская
- Village
- Location within Vologda Oblast Location within Russia
- Coordinates: 59°11′N 37°29′E
- Country: Russia
- Region: Vologda Oblast
- District: Cherepovetsky District
- Time zone: UTC+3:00

Soyvolovskaya (Russian: Сойволовская) is a rural locality (a village) in Nelazskoye Rural Settlement, Cherepovetsky District, Vologda Oblast, Russia. The population was 30 as of 2002. There are 6 streets.

== Geography ==
Soyvolovskaya is located 43 km northwest of Cherepovets (the district's administrative centre) by road. Pleshanovo is the nearest rural locality.
