= Volochaninovo =

Volochaninovo Волочаниново
- Village
- Location within Vologda Oblast Location within Russia
- Coordinates: 59°09′N 39°58′E
- Country: Russia
- Region: Vologda Oblast
- District: Vologodsky District
- Time zone: UTC+3:00

Volochaninovo (Russian: Волочаниново) is a rural locality (a village) in Podlesnoye Rural Settlement, Vologodsky District, Vologda Oblast, Russia. The population was 15 as of 2002.

== Geography ==
Volochaninovo is located between Kharachevo and Burlevo. Volochaninovo is located 10 km southeast of Vologda (the district's administrative centre) by road. Kharachevo is the nearest rural locality.
