= Zadniye Chudi =

Zadniye Chudi Задние Чуди
- Village
- Location within Vologda Oblast Location within Russia
- Coordinates: 58°46′N 37°28′E
- Country: Russia
- Region: Vologda Oblast
- District: Cherepovetsky District
- Time zone: UTC+3:00

Zadniye Chudi (Russian: Задние Чуди) is a rural locality (a village) in Nikolo-Ramenskoye Rural Settlement, Cherepovetsky District, Vologda Oblast, Russia. The population was 25 as of 2002.

== Geography ==
Zadniye Chudi is located 89 km southwest of Cherepovets (the district's administrative centre) by road. Yagnitsa is the nearest rural locality.
