= Deminskaya, Cherepovetsky District, Vologda Oblast =

Deminskaya Деминская
- Village
- Location within Vologda Oblast Location within Russia
- Coordinates: 59°31′N 38°05′E
- Country: Russia
- Region: Vologda Oblast
- District: Cherepovetsky District
- Time zone: UTC+3:00

Deminskaya (Russian: Деминская) is a rural locality (a village) in Voskresenskoye Rural Settlement, Cherepovetsky District, Vologda Oblast, Russia. The population was 7 as of 2002.

== Geography ==
Deminskaya is located 56 km (35 mi) northeast of Cherepovets (the district's administrative centre) by road. Tekar is the nearest rural locality.
