= Isayevo, Novlenskoye Rural Settlement, Vologodsky District, Vologda Oblast =

Isayevo Исаево
- Village
- Location within Vologda Oblast Location within Russia
- Coordinates: 59°26′N 39°38′E
- Country: Russia
- Region: Vologda Oblast
- District: Vologodsky District
- Time zone: UTC+3:00

Isayevo (Russian: Исаево) is a rural locality (a village) in Novlenskoye Rural Settlement, Vologodsky District, Vologda Oblast, Russia. The population was 3 as of 2002.

== Geography ==
Isayevo is located 84 km northwest of Vologda (the district's administrative centre) by road. Matveyevskoye is the nearest rural locality.
