= Khorkhorino =

Khorkhorino Хорхорино
- Village
- Location within Vologda Oblast Location within Russia
- Coordinates: 60°48′N 46°14′E
- Country: Russia
- Region: Vologda Oblast
- District: Velikoustyugsky District
- Time zone: UTC+3:00

Khorkhorino (Russian: Хорхорино) is a rural locality (a village) in Yudinskoye Rural Settlement, Velikoustyugsky District, Vologda Oblast, Russia. The population was 67 as of 2002. There are 7 streets.

== Geography ==
Khorkhorino is located 8 km northwest of Veliky Ustyug (the district's administrative centre) by road. Zolotavtsevo is the nearest rural locality.
