= Lokhta, Cherepovetsky District, Vologda Oblast =

Lokhta Лохта
- Selo
- Location within Vologda Oblast Location within Russia
- Coordinates: 59°18′N 38°06′E
- Country: Russia
- Region: Vologda Oblast
- District: Cherepovetsky District
- Time zone: UTC+3:00

Lokhta (Russian: Лохта) is a rural locality (a selo) in Yaganovskoye Rural Settlement, Cherepovetsky District, Vologda Oblast, Russia. The population was 19 as of 2002.

== Geography ==
Lokhta is located 26 km (16 mi) northeast of Cherepovets (the district's administrative centre) by road. Tsarevo is the nearest rural locality.
