= Malaya Dora =

Malaya Dora Малая Дора
- Village
- Location within Vologda Oblast Location within Russia
- Coordinates: 59°05′N 37°37′E
- Country: Russia
- Region: Vologda Oblast
- District: Cherepovetsky District
- Time zone: UTC+3:00

Malaya Dora (Russian: Малая Дора) is a rural locality (a village) in Sudskoye Rural Settlement, Cherepovetsky District, Vologda Oblast, Russia. The population was 7 as of 2002. There are 2 streets.

== Geography ==
Malaya Dora is located 45 km (28 mi) southwest of Cherepovets (the district's administrative centre) by road. Bolshaya Dora is the nearest rural locality.
