= Oseyevskaya =

Oseyevskaya Осеевская
- Village
- Location within Vologda Oblast Location within Russia
- Coordinates: 59°19′N 37°43′E
- Country: Russia
- Region: Vologda Oblast
- District: Cherepovetsky District
- Time zone: UTC+3:00

Oseyevskaya (Russian: Осеевская) is a rural locality (a village) in Abakanovskoye Rural Settlement, Cherepovetsky District, Vologda Oblast, Russia. The population was 14 as of 2002. There are 4 streets.

== Geography ==
Oseyevskaya is located 40 km (25 mi) northwest of Cherepovets (the district's administrative centre) by road. Demyanka is the nearest rural locality.
