= Ploskoye, Cherepovetsky District, Vologda Oblast =

Ploskoye Плоское
- Village
- Location within Vologda Oblast Location within Russia
- Coordinates: 58°45′N 38°25′E
- Country: Russia
- Region: Vologda Oblast
- District: Cherepovetsky District
- Time zone: UTC+3:00

Ploskoye (Russian: Плоское) is a rural locality (a village) in Myaksinskoye Rural Settlement, Cherepovetsky District, Vologda Oblast, Russia. The population was 33 as of 2002.

== Geography ==
Ploskoye is located 55 km (34 mi) southeast of Cherepovets (the district's administrative centre) by road. Muzga is the nearest rural locality.
