= Popovskoye, Kubenskoye Rural Settlement, Vologodsky District, Vologda Oblast =

Popovskoye Поповское
- Village
- Location within Vologda Oblast Location within Russia
- Coordinates: 59°27′N 39°10′E
- Country: Russia
- Region: Vologda Oblast
- District: Vologodsky District
- Time zone: UTC+3:00

Popovskoye (Russian: Поповское) is a rural locality (a village) in Kubenskoye Rural Settlement, Vologodsky District, Vologda Oblast, Russia. The population was 32 as of 2002.

== Geography ==
The distance to Vologda is 70.5 km, to Kubenskoye is 28 km. Dolmatovo is the nearest rural locality.
