= Kiriki-Ulita =

Kiriki-Ulita Кирики-Улита
- Village
- Location within Vologda Oblast Location within Russia
- Coordinates: 59°10′N 39°51′E
- Country: Russia
- Region: Vologda Oblast
- District: Vologodsky District
- Time zone: UTC+3:00

Kiriki-Ulita (Russian: Кирики-Улита) is a rural locality (a village) in Spasskoye Rural Settlement, Vologodsky District, Vologda Oblast, Russia. The population was 5 as of 2002. There are 18 streets.

== Geography ==
Kiriki-Ulita is located 7 km southwest of Vologda (the district's administrative centre) by road. Boltino is the nearest rural locality.
