= Kurkino, Novlenskoye Rural Settlement, Vologodsky District, Vologda Oblast =

Kurkino Куркино
- Village
- Location within Vologda Oblast Location within Russia
- Coordinates: 59°45′N 39°05′E
- Country: Russia
- Region: Vologda Oblast
- District: Vologodsky District
- Time zone: UTC+3:00

Kurkino (Russian: Куркино) is a rural locality (a village) in Kubenskoye Rural Settlement, Vologodsky District, Vologda Oblast, Russia. The population was 4 as of 2002.

== Geography ==
Kurkino is located 80 km northwest of Vologda (the district's administrative centre) by road. Roslovskoye is the nearest rural locality.
