= Malaya Gorka, Vologodsky District, Vologda Oblast =

Malaya Gorka Малая Горка
- Village
- Location within Vologda Oblast Location within Russia
- Coordinates: 59°32′N 39°05′E
- Country: Russia
- Region: Vologda Oblast
- District: Vologodsky District
- Time zone: UTC+3:00

Malaya Gorka (Russian: Малая Горка) is a rural locality (a village) in Novlenskoye Rural Settlement, Vologodsky District, Vologda Oblast, Russia. The population was 5 as of 2002.

== Geography ==
Malaya Gorka is located 77 km northwest of Vologda (the district's administrative centre) by road. Zrelovo is the nearest rural locality.
