= Ostretsovo, Novlenskoye Rural Settlement, Vologodsky District, Vologda Oblast =

Ostretsovo Острецово
- Village
- Location within Vologda Oblast Location within Russia
- Coordinates: 59°33′N 39°26′E
- Country: Russia
- Region: Vologda Oblast
- District: Vologodsky District
- Time zone: UTC+3:00

Ostretsovo (Russian: Острецово) is a rural locality (a village) in Novlenskoye Rural Settlement, Vologodsky District, Vologda Oblast, Russia. The population was 11 as of 2002.

== Geography ==
The distance to Vologda is 70 km, to Novlenskoye is 10 km. Osinovka is the nearest rural locality.
