= Ozero, Cherepovetsky District, Vologda Oblast =

Ozero Озеро
- Village
- Location within Vologda Oblast Location within Russia
- Coordinates: 59°02′N 38°05′E
- Country: Russia
- Region: Vologda Oblast
- District: Cherepovetsky District
- Time zone: UTC+3:00

Ozero (Russian: Озеро) is a rural locality (a village) in Yugskoye Rural Settlement, Cherepovetsky District, Vologda Oblast, Russia. The population was 60 as of 2002. There are 8 streets.

== Geography ==
Ozero is located 20 km (12 mi) southeast of Cherepovets (the district's administrative centre) by road. Finskaya is the nearest rural locality.
