= Pogost Voskresenye =

Pogost Voskresenye Погост Воскресенье
- Selo
- Location within Vologda Oblast Location within Russia
- Coordinates: 59°25′N 39°41′E
- Country: Russia
- Region: Vologda Oblast
- District: Vologodsky District
- Time zone: UTC+3:00

Pogost Voskresenye (Russian: Погост Воскресенье) is a rural locality (a selo) in Kubenskoye Rural Settlement, Vologodsky District, Vologda Oblast, Russia. The population was 7 as of 2002.

== Geography ==
Pogost Voskresenye is located 33 km northwest of Vologda (the district's administrative centre) by road. Dereventsevo is the nearest rural locality.
