= Staroye Zakharovo =

Staroye Zakharovo Старое Захарово
- Village
- Location within Vologda Oblast Location within Russia
- Coordinates: 59°29′N 37°58′E
- Country: Russia
- Region: Vologda Oblast
- District: Cherepovetsky District
- Time zone: UTC+3:00

Staroye Zakharovo (Russian: Старое Захарово) is a rural locality (a village) in Voskresenskoye Rural Settlement, Cherepovetsky District, Vologda Oblast, Russia. The population was 10 as of 2002.

== Geography ==
Staroye Zakharovo is located 49 km north of Cherepovets (the district's administrative centre) by road. Ivanovskoye is the nearest rural locality.
