= Anashkino, Cherepovetsky District, Vologda Oblast =

Anashkino Анашкино
- Village
- Location within Vologda Oblast Location within Russia
- Coordinates: 59°20′N 37°38′E
- Country: Russia
- Region: Vologda Oblast
- District: Cherepovetsky District
- Time zone: UTC+3:00

Anashkino (Russian: Анашкино) is a rural locality (a village) in Abakanovskoye Rural Settlement, Cherepovetsky District, Vologda Oblast, Russia. The population was 2 as of 2002.

== Geography ==
Anashkino is located 42 km (26 mi) northwest of Cherepovets (the district's administrative centre) by road. Sumino is the nearest rural locality.
