= Avdeyevskaya =

Avdeyevskaya Авдеевская
- Village
- Location within Vologda Oblast Location within Russia
- Coordinates: 59°18′N 37°55′E
- Country: Russia
- Region: Vologda Oblast
- District: Cherepovetsky District
- Time zone: UTC+3:00

Avdeyevskaya (Russian: Авде́евская) is a rural locality (a village) in Yaromzhskoye Rural Settlement of Cherepovetsky District, Vologda Oblast, Russia. The population was 14 as of 2002. There is 1 street.

== Geography ==
Avdeyevskaya is located 26 km north of Cherepovets (the district's administrative centre) by road. Ramenye is the nearest rural locality.
