= Chikovo, Cherepovetsky District, Vologda Oblast =

Chikovo Чиково
- Village
- Location within Vologda Oblast Location within Russia
- Coordinates: 58°53′N 38°36′E
- Country: Russia
- Region: Vologda Oblast
- District: Cherepovetsky District
- Time zone: UTC+3:00

Chikovo (Russian: Чиково) is a rural locality (a village) in Yugskoye Rural Settlement, Cherepovetsky District, Vologda Oblast, Russia. The population was 24 as of 2002.

== Geography ==
Chikovo is located 63 km (39 mi) southeast of Cherepovets (the district's administrative centre) by road. Voskresenskoye is the nearest rural locality.
