= Dora, Cherepovetsky District, Vologda Oblast =

Dora Дора
- Village
- Location within Vologda Oblast Location within Russia
- Coordinates: 59°04′N 37°37′E
- Country: Russia
- Region: Vologda Oblast
- District: Cherepovetsky District
- Time zone: UTC+3:00

Dora (Russian: Дора) is a rural locality (a village) in Abakanovskoye Rural Settlement, Cherepovetsky District, Vologda Oblast, Russia. The population was 119 as of 2002. There are 4 streets.

== Geography ==
Dora is located 54 km (34 mi) northwest of Cherepovets (the district's administrative centre) by road. Yeltukhovo is the nearest rural locality.
