= Krominskaya, Vologda Oblast =

Krominskaya Кроминская
- Village
- Location within Vologda Oblast Location within Russia
- Coordinates: 59°16′N 37°39′E
- Country: Russia
- Region: Vologda Oblast
- District: Cherepovetsky District
- Time zone: UTC+3:00

Krominskaya (Russian: Кроминская) is a rural locality (a village) in Abakanovskoye Rural Settlement, Cherepovetsky District, Vologda Oblast, Russia. The population was 17 as of 2002. There are five streets.

== Geography ==
Krominskaya is located 33 km (21 mi) northwest of Cherepovets (the district's administrative centre) by road. Selishche is the nearest rural locality.
