= Malonovlenskoye =

Malonovlenskoye Малоновленское
- Village
- Location within Vologda Oblast Location within Russia
- Coordinates: 59°22′N 39°18′E
- Country: Russia
- Region: Vologda Oblast
- District: Vologodsky District
- Time zone: UTC+3:00

Malonovlenskoye (Russian: Малоновленское) is a rural locality (a village) in Kubenskoye Rural Settlement, Vologodsky District, Vologda Oblast, Russia. The population was 132 as of 2002. There are 4 streets.

== Geography ==
Malonovlenskoye is located 54 km northwest of Vologda (the district's administrative centre) by road. Verkhnevologodsky is the nearest rural locality.
