= Nepotyagovo =

Nepotyagovo Непотягово
- Settlement
- Location within Vologda Oblast Location within Russia
- Coordinates: 59°08′N 39°48′E
- Country: Russia
- Region: Vologda Oblast
- District: Vologodsky District
- Time zone: UTC+3:00

Nepotyagovo (Russian: Непотягово) is a rural locality (a settlement) and the administrative center of Spasskoye Rural Settlement, Vologodsky District, Vologda Oblast, Russia. The population was 1,200 as of 2002. There are 31 streets.

== Geography ==
Nepotyagovo is located 11 km southwest of Vologda (the district's administrative centre) by road. Kudrino is the nearest rural locality.
