= Ogoryltsevo =

Ogoryltsevo Огорыльцево
- Village
- Location within Vologda Oblast Location within Russia
- Coordinates: 60°44′N 46°08′E
- Country: Russia
- Region: Vologda Oblast
- District: Velikoustyugsky District
- Time zone: UTC+3:00

Ogoryltsevo (Russian: Огорыльцево) is a rural locality (a village) in Mardengskoye Rural Settlement, Velikoustyugsky District, Vologda Oblast, Russia. The population was 13 as of 2002.

== Geography ==
Ogoryltsevo is located 14 km southwest of Veliky Ustyug (the district's administrative centre) by road. Torzhino is the nearest rural locality.
