= Reshetnikovo, Vologodsky District, Vologda Oblast =

Reshetnikovo Решетниково
- Village
- Location within Vologda Oblast Location within Russia
- Coordinates: 59°27′N 39°27′E
- Country: Russia
- Region: Vologda Oblast
- District: Vologodsky District
- Time zone: UTC+3:00

Reshetnikovo (Russian: Решетниково) is a rural locality (a village) in Kubenskoye Rural Settlement, Vologodsky District, Vologda Oblast, Russia. The population was 3 as of 2002.

== Geography ==
Reshetnikovo is located 48 km northwest of Vologda (the district's administrative centre) by road. Kocheurovo is the nearest rural locality.
