= Tonshalovo =

Tonshalovo Тоншалово
- Settlement
- Location within Vologda Oblast Location within Russia
- Coordinates: 59°11′N 37°56′E
- Country: Russia
- Region: Vologda Oblast
- District: Cherepovetsky District
- Time zone: UTC+3:00

Tonshalovo (Russian: Тоншалово) is a rural locality (a settlement) in Tonshalovskoye Rural Settlement, Cherepovetsky District, Vologda Oblast, Russia. The population was 4,102 as of 2002. There are 11 streets.

== Geography ==
Tonshalovo is located 9 km northeast of Cherepovets (the district's administrative centre) by road. Gorka is the nearest rural locality.
