= Dor, Staroselsky Selsoviet, Vologodsky District, Vologda Oblast =

Dor Дор
- Village
- Location within Vologda Oblast Location within Russia
- Coordinates: 59°06′N 39°13′E
- Country: Russia
- Region: Vologda Oblast
- District: Vologodsky District
- Time zone: UTC+3:00

Dor (Russian: Дор) is a rural locality (a village) in Staroselskoye Rural Settlement, Vologodsky District, Vologda Oblast, Russia. The population was 11 as of 2002.

== Geography ==
The distance to Vologda is 54 km, to Striznevo is 13 km. Novgorodovo, Derevyagino, Skripilovo are the nearest rural localities.
