= Kharinskaya =

Kharinskaya Харинская
- Village
- Location within Vologda Oblast Location within Russia
- Coordinates: 59°15′N 37°37′E
- Country: Russia
- Region: Vologda Oblast
- District: Cherepovetsky District
- Time zone: UTC+3:00

Kharinskaya (Russian: Харинская) is a rural locality (a village) in Abakanovskoye Rural Settlement, Cherepovetsky District, Vologda Oblast, Russia. The population was 8 as of 2002. There are 6 streets.

== Geography ==
Kharinskaya is located 34 km (21 mi) northwest of Cherepovets (the district's administrative centre) by road. Yeremeyevo is the nearest rural locality.
