= Nadeyeyvo =

Nadeyeyvo Надеево
- Settlement
- Location within Vologda Oblast Location within Russia
- Coordinates: 59°05′N 39°57′E
- Country: Russia
- Region: Vologda Oblast
- District: Vologodsky District
- Time zone: UTC+3:00

Nadeyeyvo (Russian: Надеево) is a rural locality (a settlement) in Podlesnoye Rural Settlement, Vologodsky District, Vologda Oblast, Russia. The population was 1,540 as of 2002. There are 8 streets.

== Geography ==
Nadeyeyvo is located 17 km southeast of Vologda (the district's administrative centre) by road. Mikhalevo is the nearest rural locality.
