= Nikiforovo, Vologodsky District, Vologda Oblast =

Nikiforovo Никифорово
- Village
- Location within Vologda Oblast Location within Russia
- Coordinates: 59°14′23″N 39°46′50″E
- Country: Russia
- Region: Vologda Oblast
- District: Vologodsky District
- Time zone: UTC+3:00

Nikiforovo (Russian: Никифорово) is a rural locality (a village) in Mayskoye Rural Settlement, Vologodsky District, Vologda Oblast, Russia. The population was 28 as of 2002.

== Geography ==
Nikiforovo is located 11 km northwest of Vologda (the district's administrative centre) by road. Sulinskoye is the nearest rural locality.
