= Novoye, Kubenskoye Rural Settlement, Vologodsky District, Vologda Oblast =

Novoye Новое
- Village
- Location within Vologda Oblast Location within Russia
- Coordinates: 59°30′N 39°32′E
- Country: Russia
- Region: Vologda Oblast
- District: Vologodsky District
- Time zone: UTC+3:00

Novoye (Russian: Новое) is a rural locality (a village) in Kubenskoye Rural Settlement, Vologodsky District, Vologda Oblast, Russia. The population was 230 as of 2002.

== Geography ==
The distance to Vologda is 43.5 km, to Kubenskoye is 12 km. Gorka-Nikolskaya is the nearest rural locality.
