= Severnaya Ferma =

Severnaya Ferma Северная Ферма
- Selo
- Location within Vologda Oblast Location within Russia
- Coordinates: 59°24′N 39°04′E
- Country: Russia
- Region: Vologda Oblast
- District: Vologodsky District
- Time zone: UTC+3:00

Severnaya Ferma (Russian: Северная Ферма) is a rural locality (a selo) in Kubenskoye Rural Settlement, Vologodsky District, Vologda Oblast, Russia. The population was 12 as of 2002. There are 4 streets.

== Geography ==
Severnaya Ferma is located 66 km northwest of Vologda (the district's administrative centre) by road. Seredneye is the nearest rural locality.
