= Veshnyaki =

Veshnyaki Вешняки
- Village
- Location within Vologda Oblast Location within Russia
- Coordinates: 58°50′N 37°13′E
- Country: Russia
- Region: Vologda Oblast
- District: Cherepovetsky District
- Time zone: UTC+3:00 (MSK)

Veshnyaki (Russian: Вешняки) is a rural locality (a village) in Nikolo-Ramenskoye Rural Settlement, Cherepovetsky District, Vologda Oblast, Russia. The population was 98 as of 2002.

== Geography ==
Veshnyaki is located 87 km southwest of Cherepovets (the district's administrative centre) by road. Kharlamovskaya is the nearest rural locality.
