= Voshchazhnikovo =

Voshchazhnikovo Вощажниково
- Village
- Location within Vologda Oblast Location within Russia
- Coordinates: 58°53′N 38°12′E
- Country: Russia
- Region: Vologda Oblast
- District: Cherepovetsky District
- Time zone: UTC+3:00

Voshchazhnikovo (Russian: Вощажниково) is a rural locality (a village) in Myaksinskoye Rural Settlement, Cherepovetsky District, Vologda Oblast, Russia. The population was 21 as of 2002.

== Geography ==
Voshchazhnikovo is located 38 km southeast of Cherepovets (the district's administrative centre) by road. Grigorevo is the nearest rural locality.
