= Andronovo, Nesvoysky Selsoviet, Vologodsky District, Vologda Oblast =

Andronovo Андроново
- Village
- Location within Vologda Oblast Location within Russia
- Coordinates: 59°21′N 39°29′E
- Country: Russia
- Region: Vologda Oblast
- District: Vologodsky District
- Time zone: UTC+3:00

Andronovo (Russian: Андроново) is a rural locality (a village) in Kubenskoye Rural Settlement, Vologodsky District, Vologda Oblast, Russia. The population was 4 as of 2002.

== Geography ==
Andronovo is located 29 km northwest of Vologda (the district's administrative centre) by road. Selyunino is the nearest rural locality.
