= Bolshoye Novo =

Bolshoye Novo Большое Ново
- Village
- Location within Vologda Oblast Location within Russia
- Coordinates: 59°07′N 37°34′E
- Country: Russia
- Region: Vologda Oblast
- District: Cherepovetsky District
- Time zone: UTC+3:00

Bolshoye Novo (Russian: Большое Ново) is a rural locality (a village) in Sudskoye Rural Settlement, Cherepovetsky District, Vologda Oblast, Russia. The population was 66 as of 2002.

== Geography ==
Bolshoye Novo is located 40 km (25 mi) west of Cherepovets (the district's administrative centre) by road. Maloye Novo is the nearest rural locality.
