= Dor, Pudegsky Selsoviet, Vologodsky District, Vologda Oblast =

Dor Дор
- Village
- Location within Vologda Oblast Location within Russia
- Coordinates: 59°08′N 39°25′E
- Country: Russia
- Region: Vologda Oblast
- District: Vologodsky District
- Time zone: UTC+3:00

Dor (Russian: Дор) is a rural locality (a village) in Pudegskoye Rural Settlement, Vologodsky District, Vologda Oblast, Russia. The population was 2 as of 2002.

== Geography ==
The distance to Vologda is 32 km, to Striznevo is 9 km. Utkino, Opuchkovo, Yurchakovo are the nearest rural localities.
