= Kachalka, Cherepovetsky District, Vologda Oblast =

Kachalka Качалка
- Village
- Location within Vologda Oblast Location within Russia
- Coordinates: 59°29′N 37°29′E
- Country: Russia
- Region: Vologda Oblast
- District: Cherepovetsky District
- Time zone: UTC+3:00

Kachalka (Russian: Качалка) is a rural locality (a village) in Voskresenskoye Rural Settlement, Cherepovetsky District, Vologda Oblast, Russia. The population was 9 as of 2002.

== Geography ==
Kachalka is located 65 km (40 mi) northwest of Cherepovets (the district's administrative centre) by road. Popovka is the nearest rural locality.
