= Kalinkino =

Kalinkino Калинкино
- Village
- Location within Vologda Oblast Location within Russia
- Coordinates: 59°17′N 39°28′E
- Country: Russia
- Region: Vologda Oblast
- District: Vologodsky District
- Time zone: UTC+3:00

Kalinkino (Russian: Калинкино) is a rural locality (a village) in Mayskoye Rural Settlement, Vologodsky District, Vologda Oblast, Russia. The population was 36 as of 2002.

== Geography ==
The distance to Vologda is 32 km, to Maysky is 16 km. Pochenga, Knyazhevo, Rossolovo, Tretnikovo, Zarya, Osinnik are the nearest rural localities.
