= Khvoshchevik =

Khvoshchevik Хвощевик
- Village
- Location within Vologda Oblast Location within Russia
- Coordinates: 58°47′N 38°21′E
- Country: Russia
- Region: Vologda Oblast
- District: Cherepovetsky District
- Time zone: UTC+3:00

Khvoshchevik (Russian: Хвощевик) is a rural locality (a village) in Myaksinskoye Rural Settlement, Cherepovetsky District, Vologda Oblast, Russia. The population was 19 as of 2002.

== Geography ==
Khvoshchevik is located 50 km (31 mi) southeast of Cherepovets (the district's administrative centre) by road. Pavlokovo is the nearest rural locality.
