= Klopuzovo =

Klopuzovo Клопузово
- Village
- Location within Vologda Oblast Location within Russia
- Coordinates: 58°56′N 37°30′E
- Country: Russia
- Region: Vologda Oblast
- District: Cherepovetsky District
- Time zone: UTC+3:00

Klopuzovo (Russian: Клопузово) is a rural locality (a village) in Korotovskoye Rural Settlement, Cherepovetsky District, Vologda Oblast, Russia. The population was 23 as of 2002. There are 2 streets.

== Geography ==
Klopuzovo is located 67 km (42 mi) southwest of Cherepovets (the district's administrative centre) by road. Sosnovka is the nearest rural locality.
