= Maslovo, Cherepovetsky District, Vologda Oblast =

Maslovo Маслово
- Village
- Location within Vologda Oblast Location within Russia
- Coordinates: 58°52′N 38°34′E
- Country: Russia
- Region: Vologda Oblast
- District: Cherepovetsky District
- Time zone: UTC+3:00

Maslovo (Russian: Маслово) is a rural locality (a village) in Yugskoye Rural Settlement, Cherepovetsky District, Vologda Oblast, Russia. The population was 11 as of 2002.

== Geography ==
Maslovo is located 65 km (40 mi) southeast of Cherepovets (the district's administrative centre) by road. Zavidovo is the nearest rural locality.
