= Novoye, Sosnovskoye Rural Settlement, Vologodsky District, Vologda Oblast =

Novoye Новое
- Village
- Location within Vologda Oblast Location within Russia
- Coordinates: 59°13′N 39°42′E
- Country: Russia
- Region: Vologda Oblast
- District: Vologodsky District
- Time zone: UTC+3:00

Novoye (Russian: Новое) is a rural locality (a village) in Sosnovskoye Rural Settlement, Vologodsky District, Vologda Oblast, Russia. The population was 230 as of 2002.

== Geography ==
The distance to Vologda is 35.5 km, to Sosnovka is 16 km. Sosnovy Bereg is the nearest rural locality.
