= Okhlopkovo, Vologodsky District, Vologda Oblast =

Okhlopkovo Охлопково
- Village
- Location within Vologda Oblast Location within Russia
- Coordinates: 59°25′N 39°43′E
- Country: Russia
- Region: Vologda Oblast
- District: Vologodsky District
- Time zone: UTC+3:00

Okhlopkovo (Russian: Охлопково) is a rural locality (a village) in Kubenskoye Rural Settlement, Vologodsky District, Vologda Oblast, Russia. The population was 1 as of 2002.

== Geography ==
Okhlopkovo is located 35 km northwest of Vologda (the district's administrative centre) by road. Okulovo is the nearest rural locality.
