= Semenkovo, Staroselskoye Rural Settlement, Vologodsky District, Vologda Oblast =

Semenkovo Семёнково
- Village
- Location within Vologda Oblast Location within Russia
- Coordinates: 59°17′N 39°04′E
- Country: Russia
- Region: Vologda Oblast
- District: Vologodsky District
- Time zone: UTC+3:00

Semenkovo (Russian: Семёнково) is a rural locality (a village) in Staroselskoye Rural Settlement, Vologodsky District, Vologda Oblast, Russia. The population was 8 as of 2002.

== Geography ==
The distance to Vologda is 68 km, to Striznevo is 17 km. Koskovo is the nearest rural locality.
