= Shelkovo, Cherepovetsky District, Vologda Oblast =

Shelkovo Шелково
- Village
- Location within Vologda Oblast Location within Russia
- Coordinates: 58°58′N 38°23′E
- Country: Russia
- Region: Vologda Oblast
- District: Cherepovetsky District
- Time zone: UTC+3:00

Shelkovo (Russian: Шелково) is a rural locality (a village) in Yugskoye Rural Settlement, Cherepovetsky District, Vologda Oblast, Russia. The population was 14, as of 2002.

== Geography ==
Shelkovo is located 44 km southeast of Cherepovets (the district's administrative centre) by road. Pokrovskoye is the nearest rural locality.
