= Terekhovo, Cherepovetsky District, Vologda Oblast =

Terekhovo Терехово
- Village
- Location within Vologda Oblast Location within Russia
- Coordinates: 59°38′N 38°06′E
- Country: Russia
- Region: Vologda Oblast
- District: Cherepovetsky District
- Time zone: UTC+3:00

Terekhovo (Russian: Терехово) is a rural locality (a village) in Voskresenskoye Rural Settlement, Cherepovetsky District, Vologda Oblast, Russia. The population was 1 as of 2002.

== Geography ==
Terekhovo is located 67 km northeast of Cherepovets (the district's administrative centre) by road. Vaskovo is the nearest rural locality.
