= Gribkovo, Vologda Oblast =

Gribkovo Грибково
- Settlement
- Location within Vologda Oblast Location within Russia
- Coordinates: 59°06′N 40°03′E
- Country: Russia
- Region: Vologda Oblast
- District: Vologodsky District
- Time zone: UTC+3:00

Gribkovo (Russian: Грибково) is a rural locality (a settlement) in Podlesnoye Rural Settlement, Vologodsky District, Vologda Oblast, Russia. The population was 1,101 as of 2002. There are 16 streets.

== Geography ==
Gribkovo is located 17 km southeast of Vologda (the district's administrative centre) by road. Pervomayskoye is the nearest rural locality.
