= Katayevo, Cherepovetsky District, Vologda Oblast =

Katayevo Катаево
- Village
- Location within Vologda Oblast Location within Russia
- Coordinates: 58°51′N 38°51′E
- Country: Russia
- Region: Vologda Oblast
- District: Cherepovetsky District
- Time zone: UTC+3:00

Katayevo (Russian: Катаево) is a rural locality (a village) in Yugskoye Rural Settlement, Cherepovetsky District, Vologda Oblast, Russia. The population was 25 as of 2002.

== Geography ==
Katayevo is located 75 km (47 mi) southeast of Cherepovets (the district's administrative centre) by road. Shishovka is the nearest rural locality.
