= Katilovo, Cherepovetsky District, Vologda Oblast =

Katilovo Катилово
- Village
- Location within Vologda Oblast Location within Russia
- Coordinates: 58°58′N 37°26′E
- Country: Russia
- Region: Vologda Oblast
- District: Cherepovetsky District
- Time zone: UTC+3:00

Katilovo (Russian: Катилово) is a rural locality (a village) in Korotovskoye Rural Settlement, Cherepovetsky District, Vologda Oblast, Russia. The population was 7 as of 2002.

== Geography ==
Katilovo is located 61 km (38 mi) southwest of Cherepovets (the district's administrative centre) by road. Uloma is the nearest rural locality.
