= Kostyayevka =

Kostyayevka Костяевка
- Village
- Location within Vologda Oblast Location within Russia
- Coordinates: 59°02′N 37°53′E
- Country: Russia
- Region: Vologda Oblast
- District: Cherepovetsky District
- Time zone: UTC+3:00

Kostyayevka (Russian: Костяевка) is a rural locality (a village) in Yugskoye Rural Settlement, Cherepovetsky District, Vologda Oblast, Russia. The population was 4 as of 2002. There are 12 streets.

== Geography ==
Kostyayevka is located 11 km (6.8 mi) south of Cherepovets (the district's administrative centre) by road. Gorodishche is the nearest rural locality.
