= Nikulino, Kuebnskoye Rural Settlement, Vologodsky District, Vologda Oblast =

Nikulino Никулино
- Village
- Location within Vologda Oblast Location within Russia
- Coordinates: 59°27′N 39°11′E
- Country: Russia
- Region: Vologda Oblast
- District: Vologodsky District
- Time zone: UTC+3:00

Nikulino (Russian: Никулино) is a rural locality (a village) in Kubenskoye Rural Settlement, Vologodsky District, Vologda Oblast, Russia. The population was 1 as of 2002.

== Geography ==
The distance to Vologda is 73 km, to Kubenskoye is 27 km. Yefimovo is the nearest rural locality.
