= Pazhetskoye =

Pazhetskoye Пажецкое
- Village
- Location within Vologda Oblast Location within Russia
- Coordinates: 59°32′N 37°26′E
- Country: Russia
- Region: Vologda Oblast
- District: Cherepovetsky District
- Time zone: UTC+3:00

Pazhetskoye (Russian: Пажецкое) is a rural locality (a village) in Voskresenskoye Rural Settlement, Cherepovetsky District, Vologda Oblast, Russia. The population was 14 as of 2002.

== Geography ==
Pazhetskoye is located 70 km (43 mi) northwest of Cherepovets (the district's administrative centre) by road. Vorotynya is the nearest rural locality.
