= Pevomaysky (settlement), Vologodsky District, Vologda Oblast =

Pevomaysky Первомайский
- Settlement
- Location within Vologda Oblast Location within Russia
- Coordinates: 59°44′N 39°04′E
- Country: Russia
- Region: Vologda Oblast
- District: Vologodsky District
- Time zone: UTC+3:00

Pevomaysky (Russian: Первомайский) is a rural locality (a settlement) in Novlenskoye Rural Settlement, Vologodsky District, Vologda Oblast, Russia. The population was 3 as of 2002.

== Geography ==
The distance to Vologda is 85 km, to Novlenskoye is 20 km. Aksenovo is the nearest rural locality.
