= Prislon, Cherepovetsky District, Vologda Oblast =

Prislon Прислон
- Village
- Location within Vologda Oblast Location within Russia
- Coordinates: 59°32′N 37°24′E
- Country: Russia
- Region: Vologda Oblast
- District: Cherepovetsky District
- Time zone: UTC+3:00

Prislon (Russian: Прислон) is a rural locality (a village) in Voskresenskoye Rural Settlement, Cherepovetsky District, Vologda Oblast, Russia. The population was 5 as of 2002.

== Geography ==
Prislon is located 72 km (45 mi) northwest of Cherepovets (the district's administrative centre) by road. Ulazorsky is the nearest rural locality.
