= Sarayevo, Mayskoye Rural Settlement, Vologodsky District, Vologda Oblast =

Sarayevo Сараево
- Village
- Location within Vologda Oblast Location within Russia
- Coordinates: 59°19′N 39°33′E
- Country: Russia
- Region: Vologda Oblast
- District: Vologodsky District
- Time zone: UTC+3:00

Sarayevo (Russian: Сараево) is a rural locality (a village) in Mayskoye Rural Settlement, Vologodsky District, Vologda Oblast, Russia. The population was 2 as of 2002.

== Geography ==
The distance to Vologda is 25 km, to Maysky is 10km. Kovylievo is the nearest village, creek Mesha.
