= Shchetinskoye =

Shchetinskoye Щетинское
- Selo
- Location within Vologda Oblast Location within Russia
- Coordinates: 58°49′N 38°18′E
- Country: Russia
- Region: Vologda Oblast
- District: Cherepovetsky District
- Time zone: UTC+3:00

Shchetinskoye (Russian: Щетинское) is a rural locality (a selo) in Myaksinskoye Rural Settlement, Cherepovetsky District, Vologda Oblast, Russia. The population was 246 as of 2002. There are 3 streets.

== Geography ==
Shchetinskoye is located 45 km southeast of Cherepovets (the district's administrative centre) by road. Novinka is the nearest rural locality.
