= Shuklino, Cherepovetsky District, Vologda Oblast =

Shuklino Шуклино
- Village
- Location within Vologda Oblast Location within Russia
- Coordinates: 59°19′N 37°32′E
- Country: Russia
- Region: Vologda Oblast
- District: Cherepovetsky District
- Time zone: UTC+3:00

Shuklino (Russian: Шуклино) is a rural locality (a village) in Abakanovskoye Rural Settlement, Cherepovetsky District, Vologda Oblast, Russia. The population was 4 as of 2002.

== Geography ==
Shuklino is located 47 km northwest of Cherepovets (the district's administrative centre) by road. Klimovskaya is the nearest rural locality.
