= Vysokovo-1 (Novlenskoye) =

Vysokovo-1 Высоково-1
- Village
- Location within Vologda Oblast Location within Russia
- Coordinates: 59°34′N 39°06′E
- Country: Russia
- Region: Vologda Oblast
- District: Vologodsky District
- Time zone: UTC+3:00

Vysokovo-1 (Russian: Высоково-1) is a rural locality (a village) in Novlenskoye Rural Settlement, Vologodsky District, Vologda Oblast, Russia. The population was 11 as of 2002.

== Geography ==
Vysokovo-1 is located 75 km northwest of Vologda (the district's administrative centre) by road. Yakutkino is the nearest rural locality.
