= Yaganovo =

Yaganovo Яганово
- Selo
- Location within Vologda Oblast Location within Russia
- Coordinates: 59°19′N 38°08′E
- Country: Russia
- Region: Vologda Oblast
- District: Cherepovetsky District
- Time zone: UTC+3:00

Yaganovo (Russian: Яганово) is a rural locality (a selo) and the administrative center of Yaganovskoye Rural Settlement, Cherepovetsky District, Vologda Oblast, Russia. The population was 823 as of 2002. There are 11 streets.

== Geography ==
Yaganovo is located 33 km northeast of Cherepovets (the district's administrative centre) by road. Nazarovskaya is the nearest rural locality.
