= Gavino, Vologda Oblast =

Gavino Гавино
- Village
- Location within Vologda Oblast Location within Russia
- Coordinates: 58°58′N 37°40′E
- Country: Russia
- Region: Vologda Oblast
- District: Cherepovetsky District
- Time zone: UTC+3:00

Gavino (Russian: Гавино) is a rural locality (a village) in Korotovskoye Rural Settlement, Cherepovetsky District, Vologda Oblast, Russia. The population was 24 as of a 2002 census. There are 3 streets.

== Geography ==
Gavino is located 86 km (53 mi) southwest of Cherepovets (the district's administrative centre) by road. Dubrovo is the nearest rural locality.
