= Pavshino, Kubenskoye Rural Settlement, Vologodsky District, Vologda Oblast =

Pavshino Павшино
- Village
- Location within Vologda Oblast Location within Russia
- Coordinates: 59°21′N 39°13′E
- Country: Russia
- Region: Vologda Oblast
- District: Vologodsky District
- Time zone: UTC+3:00

Pavshino (Russian: Павшино) is a rural locality (a village) in Kubenskoye Rural Settlement, Vologodsky District, Vologda Oblast, Russia. The population was 4 as of 2002.

== Geography ==
The distance to Vologda is 59 km, to Kubenskoye is 26 km. Odoleikha is the nearest rural locality.
