= Pochinok, Spasskoye Rural Settlement, Vologodsky District, Vologda Oblast =

Pochinok Починок
- Village
- Location within Vologda Oblast Location within Russia
- Coordinates: 58°54′N 39°29′E
- Country: Russia
- Region: Vologda Oblast
- District: Vologodsky District
- Time zone: UTC+3:00

Pochinok (Russian: Починок) is a rural locality (a village) in Spasskoye Rural Settlement, Vologodsky District, Vologda Oblast, Russia. The population was 2 as of 2002.

== Geography ==
The distance to Vologda is 67.6 km, to Nepotyagovo is 32 km. Kruglitsa is the nearest rural locality.
