= Prokino, Staroselskoye Rural Settlement, Vologodsky District, Vologda Oblast =

Prokino Прокино
- Village
- Location within Vologda Oblast Location within Russia
- Coordinates: 59°07′N 39°27′E
- Country: Russia
- Region: Vologda Oblast
- District: Vologodsky District
- Time zone: UTC+3:00

Prokino (Russian: Прокино) is a rural locality (a village) in Staroselskoye Rural Settlement, Vologodsky District, Vologda Oblast, Russia. The population was 11 as of 2002.

== Geography ==
Prokino is located 36 km southwest of Vologda (the district's administrative centre) by road. Kubayevo is the nearest rural locality.
