= Sandalovo =

Sandalovo Сандалово
- Village
- Location within Vologda Oblast Location within Russia
- Coordinates: 59°14′N 37°38′E
- Country: Russia
- Region: Vologda Oblast
- District: Cherepovetsky District
- Time zone: UTC+3:00

Sandalovo (Russian: Сандалово) is a rural locality (a village) in Abakanovskoye Rural Settlement, Cherepovetsky District, Vologda Oblast, Russia. The population was 17 as of 2002. There are 4 streets.

== Geography ==
Sandalovo is located 30 km (19 mi) northwest of Cherepovets (the district's administrative centre) by road. Volkovo is the nearest locality. etimologia
