= Shiryayevo, Vologodsky District, Vologda Oblast =

Shiryayevo Ширяево
- Village
- Location within Vologda Oblast Location within Russia
- Coordinates: 59°25′N 39°39′E
- Country: Russia
- Region: Vologda Oblast
- District: Vologodsky District
- Time zone: UTC+3:00

Shiryayevo (Russian: Ширяево) is a rural locality (a village) in Kubenskoye Rural Settlement, Vologodsky District, Vologda Oblast, Russia. The population was 3 as of 2002.

== Geography ==
Shiryayevo is located 29 km northeast of Vologda (the district's administrative centre) by road. Kurovskoye is the nearest rural locality.
