= Tishinovo =

Tishinovo Тишиново
- Village
- Location within Vologda Oblast Location within Russia
- Coordinates: 59°06′N 40°08′E
- Country: Russia
- Region: Vologda Oblast
- District: Vologodsky District
- Time zone: UTC+3:00

Tishinovo (Russian: Тишиново) is a rural locality (a village) in Markovskoye Rural Settlement, Vologodsky District, Vologda Oblast, Russia. The population was 16 as of 2002.

== Geography ==
Tishinovo is located 26 km southeast of Vologda (the district's administrative centre) by road. Paprikha is the nearest rural locality. the village was a place of pilgrimage for ufologists in 1999-2012
