= Yagnitsa =

Yagnitsa Ягница
- Village
- Location within Vologda Oblast Location within Russia
- Coordinates: 58°44′N 37°33′E
- Country: Russia
- Region: Vologda Oblast
- District: Cherepovetsky District
- Time zone: UTC+3:00

Yagnitsa (Russian: Ягница) is a rural locality (a village) in Yagnitskoye Rural Settlement, Cherepovetsky District, Vologda Oblast, Russia. The population was 368 as of 2002. There are 8 streets.

== Geography ==
Yagnitsa is located 95 km southwest of Cherepovets (the district's administrative centre) by road. Novaya Yagnitsa is the nearest rural locality.
