= Yekimovo, Cherepovetsky District, Vologda Oblast =

Yekimovo Екимово
- Village
- Location within Vologda Oblast Location within Russia
- Coordinates: 59°22′N 37°49′E
- Country: Russia
- Region: Vologda Oblast
- District: Cherepovetsky District
- Time zone: UTC+3:00

Yekimovo (Russian: Екимово) is a rural locality (a village) in Voskresenskoye Rural Settlement, Cherepovetsky District, Vologda Oblast, Russia. The population was 15 as of 2002.

== Geography ==
Yekimovo is located 44 km north of Cherepovets (the district's administrative centre) by road. Petryayevo is the nearest rural locality.
