= Dubnishnoye =

Dubnishnoye Дубнишное
- Village
- Location within Vologda Oblast Location within Russia
- Coordinates: 58°52′N 38°40′E
- Country: Russia
- Region: Vologda Oblast
- District: Cherepovetsky District
- Time zone: UTC+3:00

Dubnishnoye (Russian: Дубнишное) is a rural locality (a village) in Yugskoye Rural Settlement, Cherepovetsky District, Vologda Oblast, Russia. The population was 15 as of 2002.

== Geography ==
Dubnishnoye is located 64 km (40 mi) southeast of Cherepovets (the district's administrative centre) by road. Ilmovik is the nearest rural locality.
