= Gosha, Vologda Oblast =

Gosha Гоша
- Selo
- Location within Vologda Oblast Location within Russia
- Coordinates: 59°03′N 38°20′E
- Country: Russia
- Region: Vologda Oblast
- District: Cherepovetsky District
- Time zone: UTC+3:00

Gosha (Russian: Гоша) is a rural locality (a selo) in Yugskoye Rural Settlement, Cherepovetsky District, Vologda Oblast, Russia. The population was 50 as of 2002. There are 8 streets.

== Geography ==
Gosha is located 45 km (28 mi) southeast of Cherepovets (the district's administrative centre) by road. Ochenikovo is the nearest rural locality.
