= Konechnoye =

Konechnoye Конечное
- Village
- Location within Vologda Oblast Location within Russia
- Coordinates: 58°59′N 38°06′E
- Country: Russia
- Region: Vologda Oblast
- District: Cherepovetsky District
- Time zone: UTC+3:00

Konechnoye (Russian: Конечное) is a rural locality (a village) in Yugskoye Rural Settlement, Cherepovetsky District, Vologda Oblast, Russia. The population was 30 as of 2002. There are 12 streets.

== Geography ==
Konechnoye is located 22 km (14 mi) southeast of Cherepovets (the district's administrative centre) by road. Bolshaya Novinka is the nearest rural locality.
