= Makarovo, Novlenskoye Rural Settlement, Vologodsky District, Vologda Oblast =

Makarovo Макарово
- Village
- Location within Vologda Oblast Location within Russia
- Coordinates: 59°38′N 39°12′E
- Country: Russia
- Region: Vologda Oblast
- District: Vologodsky District
- Time zone: UTC+3:00

Makarovo (Russian: Макарово) is a rural locality (a village) in Novlenskoye Rural Settlement, Vologodsky District, Vologda Oblast, Russia. The population was 2 as of 2002.

== Geography ==
The distance to Vologda is 68 km, to Novlenskoye is 8 km. Bedrino is the nearest rural locality.
