= Malye Ugly =

Malye Ugly Малые Углы
- Village
- Location within Vologda Oblast Location within Russia
- Coordinates: 59°22′N 37°56′E
- Country: Russia
- Region: Vologda Oblast
- District: Cherepovetsky District
- Time zone: UTC+3:00

Malye Ugly (Russian: Малые Углы) is a rural locality (a village) in Voskresenskoye Rural Settlement, Cherepovetsky District, Vologda Oblast, Russia. The population was 23 as of 2002.

== Geography ==
Malye Ugly is located 33 km (21 mi) north of Cherepovets (the district's administrative centre) by road. Bolshiye Ugly is the nearest rural locality.
