= Nefedovo, Vologodsky District, Vologda Oblast =

Nefedovo Нефедово
- Village
- Location within Vologda Oblast Location within Russia
- Coordinates: 59°45′N 39°04′E
- Country: Russia
- Region: Vologda Oblast
- District: Vologodsky District
- Time zone: UTC+3:00

Nefedovo (Russian: Нефедово) is a rural locality (a village) in Novlenskoye Rural Settlement, Vologodsky District, Vologda Oblast, Russia. The population was 250 as of 2002. There are five streets.

== Geography ==
Nefedovo is located 82 km northwest of Vologda (the district's administrative centre) by road. Malgino is the nearest rural locality.
