= Podgorye, Vologodsky District, Vologda Oblast =

Podgorye Подгорье
- Village
- Location within Vologda Oblast Location within Russia
- Coordinates: 59°01′N 39°46′E
- Country: Russia
- Region: Vologda Oblast
- District: Vologodsky District
- Time zone: UTC+3:00

Podgorye (Russian: Подгорье) is a rural locality (a village) in Spasskoye Rural Settlement, Vologodsky District, Vologda Oblast, Russia. The population was 1 as of 2002. There are 2 streets.

== Geography ==
Podgorye is located 24 km southwest of Vologda (the district's administrative centre) by road. Podomartsevo is the nearest rural locality.
