= Popovka, Mayskoye Rural Settlement, Vologodsky District, Vologda Oblast =

Popovka Поповка
- Village
- Location within Vologda Oblast Location within Russia
- Coordinates: 59°16′N 39°40′E
- Country: Russia
- Region: Vologda Oblast
- District: Vologodsky District
- Time zone: UTC+3:00

Popovka (Russian: Поповка) is a rural locality (a village) in Mayskoye Rural Settlement, Vologodsky District, Vologda Oblast, Russia. The population was 69 as of 2002.

== Geography ==
The distance to Vologda is 20km, to Maysky is 4 km. Marfino ,Yagody(berry) is the nearest rural locality.
