= Pronino, Cherepovetsky District, Vologda Oblast =

Pronino Пронино
- Village
- Location within Vologda Oblast Location within Russia
- Coordinates: 59°00′N 38°27′E
- Country: Russia
- Region: Vologda Oblast
- District: Cherepovetsky District
- Time zone: UTC+3:00

Pronino (Russian: Пронино) is a rural locality (a village) in Yugskoye Rural Settlement, Cherepovetsky District, Vologda Oblast, Russia. The population was 22 as of 2002.

== Geography ==
Pronino is located 45 km (28 mi) southeast of Cherepovets (the district's administrative centre) by road. Vorobyovo is the nearest rural locality.
