= Slabeyevo =

Slabeyevo Слабеево
- Village
- Location within Vologda Oblast Location within Russia
- Coordinates: 59°14′N 37°40′E
- Country: Russia
- Region: Vologda Oblast
- District: Cherepovetsky District
- Time zone: UTC+3:00

Slabeyevo (Russian: Слабеево) is a rural locality (a village) in Abakanovskoye Rural Settlement, Cherepovetsky District, Vologda Oblast, Russia. The population was 30 as of 2002. There are 3 streets.

== Geography ==
Slabeyevo is located 29 km northwest of Cherepovets (the district's administrative centre) by road. Yeremeyevo is the nearest rural locality.
