= Sokolnikovo =

Sokolnikovo Сокольниково
- Village
- Location within Vologda Oblast Location within Russia
- Coordinates: 59°30′N 37°38′E
- Country: Russia
- Region: Vologda Oblast
- District: Cherepovetsky District
- Time zone: UTC+3:00

Sokolnikovo (Russian: Сокольниково) is a rural locality (a village) in Voskresenskoye Rural Settlement, Cherepovetsky District, Vologda Oblast, Russia. The population was 7 as of 2002.

== Geography ==
Sokolnikovo is located 57 km northwest of Cherepovets (the district's administrative centre) by road. Dmitriyevskoye is the nearest rural locality.
