= Tsarevo, Cherepovetsky District, Vologda Oblast =

Tsarevo Царево
- Village
- Location within Vologda Oblast Location within Russia
- Coordinates: 59°18′N 38°06′E
- Country: Russia
- Region: Vologda Oblast
- District: Cherepovetsky District
- Time zone: UTC+3:00

Tsarevo (Russian: Царево) is a rural locality (a village) in Yaganovskoye Rural Settlement, Cherepovetsky District, Vologda Oblast, Russia. The population was 22 as of 2002.

== Geography ==
Tsarevo is located 27 km northeast of Cherepovets (the district's administrative centre) by road. Lokhta is the nearest rural locality.
