= Tsypoglazovo =

Tsypoglazovo Цыпоглазово
- Village
- Location within Vologda Oblast Location within Russia
- Coordinates: 59°17′N 39°53′E
- Country: Russia
- Region: Vologda Oblast
- District: Vologodsky District
- Time zone: UTC+3:00

Tsypoglazovo (Russian: Цыпоглазово) is a rural locality (a village) in Semyonkovskoye Rural Settlement, Vologodsky District, Vologda Oblast, Russia. The population was 4 as of 2002.

== Geography ==
Tsypoglazovo is located 9 km north of Vologda (the district's administrative centre) by road. Kozhevnikovo is the nearest rural locality.
