= Velyamikovo =

Velyamikovo Вельямиково
- Village
- Location within Vologda Oblast Location within Russia
- Coordinates: 58°58′N 38°32′E
- Country: Russia
- Region: Vologda Oblast
- District: Cherepovetsky District
- Time zone: UTC+3:00

Velyamikovo (Russian: Вельямиково) is a rural locality (a village) in Yugskoye Rural Settlement, Cherepovetsky District, Vologda Oblast, Russia. The population was 16 as of 2002. There are 3 streets.

== Geography ==
Velyamikovo is located 54 km southeast of Cherepovets (the district's administrative centre) by road. Kuznetsovo is the nearest rural locality.
