= Zaonikiyevo =

Zaonikiyevo Заоникиево
- Passing loop
- Location within Vologda Oblast Location within Russia
- Coordinates: 59°18′N 39°55′E
- Country: Russia
- Region: Vologda Oblast
- District: Vologodsky District
- Time zone: UTC+3:00

Zaonikiyevo (Russian: Заоникиево) is a rural locality (a passing loop) in Prilukskoye Rural Settlement, Vologodsky District, Vologda Oblast, Russia. The population was 3 as of 2002.

== Geography ==
Zaonikiyevo is located 14 km north of Vologda (the district's administrative centre) by road. Semenkovo-2 is the nearest rural locality.
