= Bavlenskoye =

Bavlenskoye Бавленское
- Village
- Location within Vologda Oblast Location within Russia
- Coordinates: 58°59′N 38°15′E
- Country: Russia
- Region: Vologda Oblast
- District: Cherepovetsky District
- Time zone: UTC+3:00

Bavlenskoye (Russian: Бавленское) is a rural locality (a village) in Yugskoye Rural Settlement, Cherepovetsky District, Vologda Oblast, Russia. The population was 1 as of 2002.

== Geography ==
Bavlenskoye is located 39 km (24 mi) southeast of Cherepovets (the district's administrative centre) by road. Novogorodovo is the nearest rural locality.
