= Bogorodskoye, Vologodsky District, Vologda Oblast =

Bogorodskoye Богородское
- Village
- Location within Vologda Oblast Location within Russia
- Coordinates: 59°04′N 39°41′E
- Country: Russia
- Region: Vologda Oblast
- District: Vologodsky District
- Time zone: UTC+3:00

Bogorodskoye (Russian: Богородское) is a rural locality (a village) in Spasskoye Rural Settlement, Vologodsky District, Vologda Oblast, Russia. The population was 3 as of 2002.

== Geography ==
Bogorodskoye is located 27 km southwest of Vologda (the district's administrative centre) by road. Volnino is the nearest rural locality.
