= Ivashevo, Vologodsky District, Vologda Oblast =

Ivashevo Ивашево
- Village
- Location within Vologda Oblast Location within Russia
- Coordinates: 59°48′N 38°59′E
- Country: Russia
- Region: Vologda Oblast
- District: Vologodsky District
- Time zone: UTC+3:00

Ivashevo (Russian: Ивашево) is a rural locality (a village) in Novlenskoye Rural Settlement, Vologodsky District, Vologda Oblast, Russia. The population was 4 as of 2002.

== Geography ==
Ivashevo is located 91 km northwest of Vologda (the district's administrative centre) by road. Kudryavtsevo is the nearest rural locality.
