= Kipelovo, Vologda Oblast =

Kipelovo Кипелово
- Settlement
- Location within Vologda Oblast Location within Russia
- Coordinates: 59°14′N 39°08′E
- Country: Russia
- Region: Vologda Oblast
- District: Vologodsky District
- Time zone: UTC+3:00

Kipelovo (Russian: Кипелово) is a rural locality (a settlement) in Staroselskoye Rural Settlement, Vologodsky District, Vologda Oblast, Russia. The population was 882 as of 2002. There are 7 streets.

== Geography ==
Kipelovo is located 52 km northwest of Vologda (the district's administrative centre) by road. Gureikha is the nearest rural locality.
