= Litvinovo, Vologda Oblast =

Litvinovo Литвиново
- Village
- Location within Vologda Oblast Location within Russia
- Coordinates: 59°33′N 38°00′E
- Country: Russia
- Region: Vologda Oblast
- District: Cherepovetsky District
- Time zone: UTC+3:00

Litvinovo (Russian: Литвиново) is a rural locality (a village) in Voskresenskoye Rural Settlement, Cherepovetsky District, Vologda Oblast, Russia. The population was 6 as of 2002.

== Geography ==
Litvinovo is located 58 km (36 mi) northeast of Cherepovets (the district's administrative centre) by road. Gorka is the nearest rural locality.
