= Muzga, Vologda Oblast =

Muzga Музга
- Village
- Location within Vologda Oblast Location within Russia
- Coordinates: 58°45′N 38°24′E
- Country: Russia
- Region: Vologda Oblast
- District: Cherepovetsky District
- Time zone: UTC+3:00

Muzga (Russian: Музга) is a rural locality (a village) in Myaksinskoye Rural Settlement, Cherepovetsky District, Vologda Oblast, Russia. The population was 218 as of 2002. There are 4 streets.

== Geography ==
Muzga is located 53 km (33 mi) southeast of Cherepovets (the district's administrative centre) by road. Ilyinskoye is the nearest rural locality.
