= Novy Istochnik =

Novy Istochnik Новый Источник
- Settlement
- Location within Vologda Oblast Location within Russia
- Coordinates: 59°11′N 39°31′E
- Country: Russia
- Region: Vologda Oblast
- District: Vologodsky District
- Time zone: UTC+3:00

Novy Istochnik (Russian: Новый Источник) is a rural locality (a settlement) in Sosnovskoye Rural Settlement, Vologodsky District, Vologda Oblast, Russia. The population was 35 as of 2002. There are 3 streets.

== Geography ==
Novy Istochnik is located 24 km west of Vologda (the district's administrative centre) by road. Striznevo is the nearest rural locality.
