= Nyagoslovo =

Nyagoslovo Нягослово
- Village
- Location within Vologda Oblast Location within Russia
- Coordinates: 59°21′N 38°11′E
- Country: Russia
- Region: Vologda Oblast
- District: Cherepovetsky District
- Time zone: UTC+3:00

Nyagoslovo (Russian: Нягослово) is a rural locality (a village) in Yaganovskoye Rural Settlement, Cherepovetsky District, Vologda Oblast, Russia. The population was 3 as of 2002.

== Geography ==
Nyagoslovo is located 39 km (24 mi) northeast of Cherepovets (the district's administrative centre) by road. Pochinok is the nearest rural locality.
