= Romanovo, Staroselskoye Rural Settlement, Vologodsky District, Vologda Oblast =

Romanovo Романово
- Village
- Location within Vologda Oblast Location within Russia
- Coordinates: 59°10′N 39°14′E
- Country: Russia
- Region: Vologda Oblast
- District: Vologodsky District
- Time zone: UTC+3:00

Romanovo (Russian: Романово) is a rural locality (a village) in Staroselskoye Rural Settlement, Vologodsky District, Vologda Oblast, Russia. The population was 10 as of 2002.

== Geography ==
The distance to Vologda is 46 km, to Striznevo is 5 km. Kotelnikovo is the nearest rural locality.
