= Skorbezhevo =

Skorbezhevo Скорбежево
- Village
- Location within Vologda Oblast Location within Russia
- Coordinates: 59°11′N 39°41′E
- Country: Russia
- Region: Vologda Oblast
- District: Vologodsky District
- Time zone: UTC+3:00
- Postal code: 160521

Skorbezhevo (Russian: Скорбежево) is a rural locality (a village) in Leskovskoye Rural Settlement, Vologodsky District, Vologda Oblast, Russia. The population was 2 as of 2002.

== Geography ==
Skorbezhevo is located 14 km southwest of Vologda (the district's administrative centre) by road. Yermakovo is the nearest rural locality.
