= Vladychnevo =

Vladychnevo Владычнево
- Village
- Location within Vologda Oblast Location within Russia
- Coordinates: 59°43′N 39°09′E
- Country: Russia
- Region: Vologda Oblast
- District: Vologodsky District
- Time zone: UTC+3:00

Vladychnevo (Russian: Владычнево) is a rural locality (a village) in Novlenskoye Rural Settlement, Vologodsky District, Vologda Oblast, Russia. The population was 165 as of 2002.

== Geography ==
The distance to Vologda is 75 km, to Novlenskoye is 15 km. Mitenskoye, Dilyalevo, Lepigino, Nagornovo are the nearest rural localities.
