= Barskoye Pole =

Barskoye Pole Барское Поле
- Village
- Location within Vologda Oblast Location within Russia
- Coordinates: 58°57′N 38°23′E
- Country: Russia
- Region: Vologda Oblast
- District: Cherepovetsky District
- Time zone: UTC+3:00

Barskoye Pole (Russian: Барское Поле) is a rural locality (a village) in Yugskoye Rural Settlement, Cherepovetsky District, Vologda Oblast, Russia. The population was 20 as of 2002.

== Geography ==
Barskoye Pole is located 43 km (27 mi) southeast of Cherepovets (the district's administrative centre) by road. Batransky is the nearest rural locality.
