= Khmelevoye =

Khmelevoye Хмелевое
- Village
- Location within Vologda Oblast Location within Russia
- Coordinates: 58°44′N 38°27′E
- Country: Russia
- Region: Vologda Oblast
- District: Cherepovetsky District
- Time zone: UTC+3:00

Khmelevoye (Russian: Хмелевое) is a rural locality (a village) in Myaksinskoye Rural Settlement, Cherepovetsky District, Vologda Oblast, Russia. The population was 40 as of 2002.

== Geography ==
Khmelevoye is located 58 km (36 mi) southeast of Cherepovets (the district's administrative centre) by road. Ploskoye is the nearest rural locality.
