= Korobovo, Vologodsky District, Vologda Oblast =

Korobovo Коробово
- Village
- Location within Vologda Oblast Location within Russia
- Coordinates: 59°37′N 39°20′E
- Country: Russia
- Region: Vologda Oblast
- District: Vologodsky District
- Time zone: UTC+3:00

Korobovo (Russian: Коробово) is a rural locality (a village) in Sosnovskoye Rural Settlement, Vologodsky District, Vologda Oblast, Russia. The population was 158 as of 2002. There are 4 streets.

== Geography ==
Korobovo is located 61 km northwest of Vologda (the district's administrative centre) by road. Andryushino is the nearest rural locality.
