= Leontyevka, Vologda Oblast =

Leontyevka Леонтьевка
- Village
- Location within Vologda Oblast Location within Russia
- Coordinates: 59°07′N 37°35′E
- Country: Russia
- Region: Vologda Oblast
- District: Cherepovetsky District
- Time zone: UTC+3:00

Leontyevka (Russian: Леонтьевка) is a rural locality (a village) in Sudskoye Rural Settlement, Cherepovetsky District, Vologda Oblast, Russia. The population was 16 as of 2002.

== Geography ==
Leontyevka is located 41 km (25 mi) west of Cherepovets (the district's administrative centre) by road. Suda is the nearest rural locality.
