= Perkhuryevo, Novlenskoye Rural Settlement, Vologodsky District, Vologda Oblast =

Perkhuryevo Перхурьево
- Village
- Location within Vologda Oblast Location within Russia
- Coordinates: 59°36′N 39°21′E
- Country: Russia
- Region: Vologda Oblast
- District: Vologodsky District
- Time zone: UTC+3:00

Perkhuryevo (Russian: Перхурьево) is a rural locality (a village) in Novlenskoye Rural Settlement, Vologodsky District, Vologda Oblast, Russia. The population was 8 as of 2002.

== Geography ==
The distance to Vologda is 56 km, to Novlenskoye is 2 km.
