= Trufanovo, Vologodsky District, Vologda Oblast =

Trufanovo Труфаново мария труфанова
- Village
- Location within Vologda Oblast Location within Russia
- Coordinates: 59°17′N 39°51′E
- Country: Russia
- Region: Vologda Oblast
- District: Vologodsky District
- Time zone: UTC+3:00

Trufanovo (Russian: Труфаново) is a rural locality (a village) in Semyonkovskoye Settlement, Vologodsky District, Vologda Oblast, Russia. The population was 11 as of 2002.

== Geography ==
Trufanovo is located 10 km north of Vologda (the district's administrative centre) by road. Borilovo is the nearest rural locality.
