= Ugryumovo =

Ugryumovo Угрюмово
- Selo
- Location within Vologda Oblast Location within Russia
- Coordinates: 59°23′N 38°08′E
- Country: Russia
- Region: Vologda Oblast
- District: Cherepovetsky District
- Time zone: UTC+3:00

Ugryumovo (Russian: Угрюмово) is a rural locality (a selo) in Yaganovskoye Rural Settlement, Cherepovetsky District, Vologda Oblast, Russia. The population was 32 as of 2002. There are 3 streets.

== Geography ==
Ugryumovo is located 41 km north of Cherepovets (the district's administrative centre) by road. Gorka is the nearest rural locality.
