= Vaneyevo =

Vaneyevo Ванеево
- Village
- Location within Vologda Oblast Location within Russia
- Coordinates: 59°06′N 38°04′E
- Country: Russia
- Region: Vologda Oblast
- District: Cherepovetsky District
- Time zone: UTC+3:00

Vaneyevo (Russian: Ванеево) is a rural locality (a village) in Irdomatskoye Rural Settlement, Cherepovetsky District, Vologda Oblast, Russia. The population was 65 as of 2002. There are 15 streets.

== Geography ==
Vaneyevo is located 12 km southeast of Cherepovets (the district's administrative centre) by road. Irdomatka is the nearest rural locality.
