= Yershovo, Cherepovetsky District, Vologda Oblast =

Yershovo Ершово
- Village
- Location within Vologda Oblast Location within Russia
- Coordinates: 58°56′N 38°13′E
- Country: Russia
- Region: Vologda Oblast
- District: Cherepovetsky District
- Time zone: UTC+3:00

Yershovo (Russian: Ершово) is a rural locality (a village) in Myaksinskoye Rural Settlement, Cherepovetsky District, Vologda Oblast, Russia. The population was 6 as of 2002.

== Geography ==
Yershovo is located 33 km southeast of Cherepovets (the district's administrative centre) by road. Bykovo is the nearest rural locality.
