= Zabolotye, Vologodsky District, Vologda Oblast =

Zabolotye Заболотье
- Village
- Location within Vologda Oblast Location within Russia
- Coordinates: 59°38′N 38°59′E
- Country: Russia
- Region: Vologda Oblast
- District: Vologodsky District
- Time zone: UTC+3:00

Zabolotye (Russian: Заболотье) is a rural locality (a village) in Novlenskoye Rural Settlement, Vologodsky District, Vologda Oblast, Russia. The population was 1 as of 2002.

== Geography ==
Zabolotye is located 88 km northwest of Vologda (the district's administrative centre) by road. Bobrovskoye is the nearest rural locality.
