= Bocheyno =

Bocheyno Бочейно
- Village
- Location within Vologda Oblast Location within Russia
- Coordinates: 59°02′N 37°24′E
- Country: Russia
- Region: Vologda Oblast
- District: Cherepovetsky District
- Time zone: UTC+3:00

Bocheyno (Russian: Бочейно) is a rural locality (a village) in Korotovskoye Rural Settlement, Cherepovetsky District, Vologda Oblast, Russia. The population was 6 as of 2002. There are 2 streets.

== Geography ==
Bocheyno is located 54 km (34 mi) southwest of Cherepovets (the district's administrative centre) by road. Gorka is the nearest rural locality.
