= Derevnishcha =

Derevnishcha Деревнища
- Village
- Location within Vologda Oblast Location within Russia
- Coordinates: 59°26′N 37°48′E
- Country: Russia
- Region: Vologda Oblast
- District: Cherepovetsky District
- Time zone: UTC+3:00

Derevnishcha (Russian: Деревнища) is a rural locality (a village) in Voskresenskoye Rural Settlement, Cherepovetsky District, Vologda Oblast, Russia. The population was 16 as of 2002.

== Geography ==
Derevnishcha is located 47 km (29 mi) north of Cherepovets (the district's administrative centre) by road. Dermyaninskoye is the nearest rural locality.
