= Duravino =

Duravino Дуравино
- Village
- Location within Vologda Oblast Location within Russia
- Coordinates: 59°04′N 40°01′E
- Country: Russia
- Region: Vologda Oblast
- District: Vologodsky District
- Time zone: UTC+3:00

Duravino (Russian: Дуравино) is a rural locality (a village) in Podlesnoye Rural Settlement, Vologodsky District, Vologda Oblast, Russia. The population was 9 as of 2002.

== Geography ==
The distance to Vologda is 27 km, to Ogarkovo is 14 km. Pogorelka, Melnikovo, Vinnikovo, Semyonovskoye, Kostino are the nearest rural localities.
