= Khemalda =

Khemalda Хемалда
- Village
- Location within Vologda Oblast Location within Russia
- Coordinates: 59°07′N 38°04′E
- Country: Russia
- Region: Vologda Oblast
- District: Cherepovetsky District
- Time zone: UTC+3:00

Khemalda (Russian: Хемалда) is a rural locality (a village) in Irdomatskoye Rural Settlement, Cherepovetsky District, Vologda Oblast, Russia. The population was 25 as of 2002. There are 2 streets.

== Geography ==
Khemalda is located 13 km (8.1 mi) east of Cherepovets (the district's administrative centre) by road. Vaneyevo is the nearest rural locality.
