= Konishchevo, Vologodsky District, Vologda Oblast =

Konishchevo Конищево
- Village
- Location within Vologda Oblast Location within Russia
- Coordinates: 59°08′N 39°47′E
- Country: Russia
- Region: Vologda Oblast
- District: Vologodsky District
- Time zone: UTC+3:00

Konishchevo (Russian: Конищево) is a rural locality (a village) in Sosnovskoye Rural Settlement, Vologodsky District, Vologda Oblast, Russia. The population was 2 as of 2002.

== Geography ==
Konishchevo is located 13 km southwest of Vologda (the district's administrative centre) by road. Mozhayskoye is the nearest rural locality.
