= Makoveyevo =

Makoveyevo Маковеево
- Village
- Location within Vologda Oblast Location within Russia
- Coordinates: 59°34′N 37°19′E
- Country: Russia
- Region: Vologda Oblast
- District: Cherepovetsky District
- Time zone: UTC+3:00

Makoveyevo (Russian: Маковеево) is a rural locality (a village) in Voskresenskoye Rural Settlement, Cherepovetsky District, Vologda Oblast, Russia. The population was 1 as of 2002.

== Geography ==
Makoveyevo is located 78 km (48 mi) northwest of Cherepovets (the district's administrative centre) by road. Ulazorsky is the nearest rural locality.
