= Pavlikovo, Vologodsky District, Vologda Oblast =

Pavlikovo Павликово
- Village
- Location within Vologda Oblast Location within Russia
- Coordinates: 59°15′N 39°03′E
- Country: Russia
- Region: Vologda Oblast
- District: Vologodsky District
- Time zone: UTC+3:00

Pavlikovo (Russian: Павликово) is a rural locality (a village) in Staroselskoye Rural Settlement, Vologodsky District, Vologda Oblast, Russia. The population was 2 as of 2002.

== Geography ==
Pavlikovo is located 69 km west of Vologda (the district's administrative centre) by road. Tatarinovo is the nearest rural locality.
