= Pavlokovo =

Pavlokovo Павлоково
- Village
- Location within Vologda Oblast Location within Russia
- Coordinates: 58°47′N 38°20′E
- Country: Russia
- Region: Vologda Oblast
- District: Cherepovetsky District
- Time zone: UTC+3:00

Pavlokovo (Russian: Павлоково) is a rural locality (a village) in Myaksinskoye Rural Settlement, Cherepovetsky District, Vologda Oblast, Russia. The population was 40 as of 2002.

== Geography ==
Pavlokovo is located 49 km (30 mi) southeast of Cherepovets (the district's administrative centre) by road. Petrovskoye is the nearest rural locality.
