= Shukhobod =

Shukhobod Шухободь
- Selo
- Location within Vologda Oblast Location within Russia
- Coordinates: 59°13′N 37°42′E
- Country: Russia
- Region: Vologda Oblast
- District: Cherepovetsky District
- Time zone: UTC+3:00

Shukhobod (Russian: Шухободь) is a rural locality (a selo) in Abakanovskoye Rural Settlement, Cherepovetsky District, Vologda Oblast, Russia. The population was 1,542 as of 2002. There are 4 streets.

== Geography ==
Shukhobod is located 29 km northwest of Cherepovets (the district's administrative centre) by road. Korablevo is the nearest rural locality.
