= Surkovo, Vologda Oblast =

Surkovo Сурково
- Village
- Location within Vologda Oblast Location within Russia
- Coordinates: 58°59′N 38°20′E
- Country: Russia
- Region: Vologda Oblast
- District: Cherepovetsky District
- Time zone: UTC+3:00

Surkovo (Russian: Сурково) is a rural locality (a village) in Yugskoye Rural Settlement, Cherepovetsky District, Vologda Oblast, Russia. The population was 239 as of 2002. There are 2 streets.

== Geography ==
Surkovo is located about 37 km southeast of Cherepovets, the district's administrative centre, by road. The nearest rural locality is Tolmachevo.
