= Vlasyevo, Vologodsky District, Vologda Oblast =

Vlasyevo Власьево
- Village
- Location within Vologda Oblast Location within Russia
- Coordinates: 59°20′N 39°34′E
- Country: Russia
- Region: Vologda Oblast
- District: Vologodsky District
- Time zone: UTC+3:00

Vlasyevo (Russian: Власьево) is a rural locality (a village) in Kubenskoye Rural Settlement, Vologodsky District, Vologda Oblast, Russia. The population was 3 as of 2002.

== Geography ==
Vlasyevo is located 32 km northwest of Vologda (the district's administrative centre) by road. Anisovo is the nearest rural locality.
