= Yurovo, Vologodsky District, Vologda Oblast =

Yurovo Юрово
- Village
- Location within Vologda Oblast Location within Russia
- Coordinates: 59°08′N 39°45′E
- Country: Russia
- Region: Vologda Oblast
- District: Vologodsky District
- Time zone: UTC+3:00

Yurovo (Russian: Юрово) is a rural locality (a village) in Spasskoye Rural Settlement, Vologodsky District, Vologda Oblast, Russia. The population was 82 as of 2002. There are 4 streets.

== Geography ==
Yurovo is located 13 km southwest of Vologda (the district's administrative centre) by road. Zvyaga is the nearest rural locality.
