= Akinkhovo =

Akinkhovo Акиньхово
- Village
- Location within Vologda Oblast Location within Russia
- Coordinates: 59°02′N 37°19′E
- Country: Russia
- Region: Vologda Oblast
- District: Cherepovetsky District
- Time zone: UTC+3:00

Akinkhovo (Russian: Акиньхово) is a rural locality (a village) in Korotovskoye Rural Settlement, Cherepovetsky District, Vologda Oblast, Russia. The population was 35 as of 2002.

== Geography ==
Akinkhovo is located 54 km (34 mi) southwest of Cherepovets (the district's administrative centre) by road. Ryazan is the nearest rural locality.
