= Aleshino, Vologodsky District, Vologda Oblast =

Aleshino Алёшино
- Village
- Location within Vologda Oblast Location within Russia
- Coordinates: 59°25′N 39°40′E
- Country: Russia
- Region: Vologda Oblast
- District: Vologodsky District
- Time zone: UTC+3:00

Aleshino (Russian: Алёшино) is a rural locality (a village) in Kubenskoye Rural Settlement, Vologodsky District, Vologda Oblast, Russia. The population was 39 as of 2002.

== Geography ==
Aleshino is located 31 km northwest of Vologda (the district's administrative centre) by road. Pogost Voskresenye is the nearest rural locality.
