= Alexandrovo, Vologodsky District, Vologda Oblast =

Alexandrovo Александрово
- Village
- Location within Vologda Oblast Location within Russia
- Coordinates: 59°19′N 39°23′E
- Country: Russia
- Region: Vologda Oblast
- District: Vologodsky District
- Time zone: UTC+3:00

Alexandrovo (Russian: Александрово) is a rural locality (a village) in Mayskoye Rural Settlement, Vologodsky District, Vologda Oblast, Russia. The population was 1 as of 2002.

== Geography ==
Alexandrovo is located 35 km northwest of Vologda (the district's administrative centre) by road. Koryakino is the nearest rural locality.
