= Khantanovo =

Khantanovo Хантаново
- Village
- Location within Vologda Oblast Location within Russia
- Coordinates: 58°54′N 38°14′E
- Country: Russia
- Region: Vologda Oblast
- District: Cherepovetsky District
- Time zone: UTC+3:00

Khantanovo (Russian: Хантаново) is a rural locality (a village) in Myaksinskoye Rural Settlement, Cherepovetsky District, Vologda Oblast, Russia. The population was 16 as of 2002.

== Geography ==
Khantanovo is located 39 km (24 mi) southeast of Cherepovets (the district's administrative centre) by road. Voshchazhnikovo is the nearest rural locality.
