= Kizboy =

Kizboy Кизбой
- Village
- Location within Vologda Oblast Location within Russia
- Coordinates: 59°37′N 37°35′E
- Country: Russia
- Region: Vologda Oblast
- District: Cherepovetsky District
- Time zone: UTC+3:00

Kizboy (Russian: Кизбой) is a rural locality (a village) in Voskresenskoye Rural Settlement, Cherepovetsky District, Vologda Oblast, Russia. The population was 6 as of 2002. There are 2 streets.

== Geography ==
Kizboy is located 70 km (43 mi) northwest of Cherepovets (the district's administrative centre) by road. Maltsevo is the nearest rural locality.
