= Korablevo =

Korablevo Кораблево
- Village
- Location within Vologda Oblast Location within Russia
- Coordinates: 59°13′N 37°42′E
- Country: Russia
- Region: Vologda Oblast
- District: Cherepovetsky District
- Time zone: UTC+3:00

Korablevo (Russian: Кораблево) is a rural locality (a village) in Abakanovskoye Rural Settlement, Cherepovetsky District, Vologda Oblast, Russia. The population was 38 as of 2002. There are 3 streets.

== Geography ==
Korablevo is located 29 km (18 mi) northwest of Cherepovets (the district's administrative centre) by road. Shukhobod is the nearest rural locality.
