= Kozokhta =

Kozokhta Козохта
- Selo
- Location within Vologda Oblast Location within Russia
- Coordinates: 59°00′N 38°13′E
- Country: Russia
- Region: Vologda Oblast
- District: Cherepovetsky District
- Time zone: UTC+3:00

Kozokhta (Russian: Козохта) is a rural locality (a selo) in Yugskoye Rural Settlement, Cherepovetsky District, Vologda Oblast, Russia. The population was 5 as of 2002. There are 2 streets.

== Geography ==
Kozokhta is located 30 km (19 mi) southeast of Cherepovets (the district's administrative centre) by road. Zhary is the nearest rural locality.
