= Muravyovo, Vologodsky District, Vologda Oblast =

Muravyovo Муравьево
- Village
- Location within Vologda Oblast Location within Russia
- Coordinates: 59°20′N 40°00′E
- Country: Russia
- Region: Vologda Oblast
- District: Vologodsky District
- Time zone: UTC+3:00

Muravyovo (Russian: Муравьево) is a rural locality (a village) in Prilukskoye Rural Settlement, Vologodsky District, Vologda Oblast, Russia. The population was 3 as of 2002.

== Geography ==
Muravyovo is located 17 km northeast of Vologda (the district's administrative centre) by road. Vedrovo is the nearest rural locality.
