= Novotryumovo =

Novotryumovo Новотрюмово
- Village
- Location within Vologda Oblast Location within Russia
- Coordinates: 59°28′N 37°50′E
- Country: Russia
- Region: Vologda Oblast
- District: Cherepovetsky District
- Time zone: UTC+3:00

Novotryumovo (Russian: Новотрюмово) is a rural locality (a village) in Voskresenskoye Rural Settlement, Cherepovetsky District, Vologda Oblast, Russia. The population was 6 as of 2002.

== Geography ==
Novotryumovo is located 43 km (27 mi) north of Cherepovets (the district's administrative centre) by road. Gorka is the nearest rural locality.
