= Ochenikovo =

Ochenikovo Очениково
- Village
- Location within Vologda Oblast Location within Russia
- Coordinates: 59°01′N 38°20′E
- Country: Russia
- Region: Vologda Oblast
- District: Cherepovetsky District
- Time zone: UTC+3:00

Ochenikovo (Russian: Очениково) is a rural locality (a village) in Yugskoye Rural Settlement, Cherepovetsky District, Vologda Oblast, Russia. The population was 34 as of 2002.

== Geography ==
Ochenikovo is located 40 km (25 mi) southeast of Cherepovets (the district's administrative centre) by road. Dmitriyevskoye is the nearest rural locality.
