= Plyushchevo, Vologodsky District, Vologda Oblast =

Plyushchevo Плющево
- Village
- Location within Vologda Oblast Location within Russia
- Coordinates: 59°39′N 39°16′E
- Country: Russia
- Region: Vologda Oblast
- District: Vologodsky District
- Time zone: UTC+3:00

Plyushchevo (Russian: Плющево) is a rural locality (a village) in Novlenskoye Rural Settlement, Vologodsky District, Vologda Oblast, Russia. The population was 12 as of 2002.

== Geography ==
Plyushchevo is located 64 km northwest of Vologda (the district's administrative centre) by road. Podolets is the nearest rural locality.
