= Pochinok, Leskovskoye Rural Settlement, Vologodsky District, Vologda Oblast =

Pochinok Починок
- Village
- Location within Vologda Oblast Location within Russia
- Coordinates: 59°12′N 39°37′E
- Country: Russia
- Region: Vologda Oblast
- District: Vologodsky District
- Time zone: UTC+3:00

Pochinok (Russian: Починок) is a rural locality (a village) in Leskovskoye Rural Settlement, Vologodsky District, Vologda Oblast, Russia. The population was 2 as of 2002.

== Geography ==
The distance to Vologda is 16 km, to Leskovo is 1 km. Leskovo is the nearest rural locality.
