= Shabanova Gora =

Shabanova Gora Шабанова Гора
- Village
- Location within Vologda Oblast Location within Russia
- Coordinates: 59°27′N 37°52′E
- Country: Russia
- Region: Vologda Oblast
- District: Cherepovetsky District
- Time zone: UTC+3:00

Shabanova Gora (Russian: Шабанова Гора) is a rural locality (a village) in Voskresenskoye Rural Settlement, Cherepovetsky District, Vologda Oblast, Russia. The population was 36 as of 2002.

== Geography ==
Shabanova Gora is located 41 km north of Cherepovets (the district's administrative centre) by road. Gorka is the nearest rural locality.
