= Voynovo, Vologda Oblast =

Voynovo Войново
- Village
- Location within Vologda Oblast Location within Russia
- Coordinates: 59°12′N 37°56′E
- Country: Russia
- Region: Vologda Oblast
- District: Cherepovetsky District
- Time zone: UTC+3:00

Voynovo (Russian: Войново) is a rural locality (village) in Tonshalovskoye Rural Settlement, Cherepovetsky District, Vologda Oblast, Russia. The population was 37 as of 2002. There are 4 streets.

== Geography ==
Voynovo is located 12 km northeast of Cherepovets (the district's administrative centre) by road. Tonshalovo is the nearest rural locality.
