= Gora, Cherepovetsky District, Vologda Oblast =

Gora Гора
- Village
- Location within Vologda Oblast Location within Russia
- Coordinates: 59°34′N 37°16′E
- Country: Russia
- Region: Vologda Oblast
- District: Cherepovetsky District
- Time zone: UTC+3:00

Gora (Russian: Гора) is a rural locality (a village) in Voskresenskoye Rural Settlement, Cherepovetsky District, Vologda Oblast, Russia. The population was 5 as of 2002.

== Geography ==
Gora is located 81 km (50 mi) northwest of Cherepovets (the district's administrative centre) by road. Zakharovo is the nearest rural locality.
