= Laptevo, Vologda Oblast =

Laptevo Лаптево
- Village
- Location within Vologda Oblast Location within Russia
- Coordinates: 59°29′N 37°33′E
- Country: Russia
- Region: Vologda Oblast
- District: Cherepovetsky District
- Time zone: UTC+3:00

Laptevo (Russian: Лаптево) is a rural locality (a village) in Voskresenskoye Rural Settlement, Cherepovetsky District, Vologda Oblast, Russia. The population was 5 as of 2002.

== Geography ==
Laptevo is located 61 km (38 mi) northwest of Cherepovets (the district's administrative centre) by road. Popovka is the nearest rural locality.
