= Maryukhino, Vologda Oblast =

Maryukhino Марюхино
- Village
- Location within Vologda Oblast Location within Russia
- Coordinates: 59°09′N 39°52′E
- Country: Russia
- Region: Vologda Oblast
- District: Vologodsky District
- Time zone: UTC+3:00

Maryukhino (Russian: Марюхино) is a rural locality (a village) in Novlenskoye Rural Settlement, Vologodsky District, Vologda Oblast, Russia. The population was 298 as of 2002. There are 8 streets.

== Geography ==
Maryukhino is located 8 km south of Vologda (the district's administrative centre) by road. Petrovskoye is the nearest rural locality.
