= Smykovo, Vologda Oblast =

Smykovo Смыково
- Village
- Location within Vologda Oblast Location within Russia
- Coordinates: 59°18′N 39°36′E
- Country: Russia
- Region: Vologda Oblast
- District: Vologodsky District
- Time zone: UTC+3:00

Smykovo (Russian: Смыково) is a rural locality (a village) in Mayskoye Rural Settlement, Vologodsky District, Vologda Oblast, Russia. The population was 5 as of 2002. There are 3 streets.

== Geography ==
Smykovo is located 11 km northwest of Vologda (the district's administrative centre) by road. Kovyliovo is the nearest locality. Creek Mesha
