= Utkino, Vologodsky District, Vologda Oblast =

Utkino Уткино
- Settlement
- Location within Vologda Oblast Location within Russia
- Coordinates: 59°08′N 39°24′E
- Country: Russia
- Region: Vologda Oblast
- District: Vologodsky District
- Time zone: UTC+3:00

Utkino (Russian: Уткино) is a rural locality (a settlement) in Staroselskoye Rural Settlement, Vologodsky District, Vologda Oblast, Russia. The population was 720 as of 2002. There are 4 streets.

== Geography ==
Utkino is located 32 km southwest of Vologda (the district's administrative centre) by road. Dor is the nearest rural locality.
