= Zhilino, Vologodsky District, Vologda Oblast =

Zhilino Жилино
- Village
- Location within Vologda Oblast Location within Russia
- Coordinates: 59°07′N 39°48′E
- Country: Russia
- Region: Vologda Oblast
- District: Vologodsky District
- Time zone: UTC+3:00

Zhilino (Russian: Жилино) is a rural locality (a village) in Spasskoye Rural Settlement, Vologodsky District, Vologda Oblast, Russia. The population was 1 as of 2002. There are 14 streets.

== Geography ==
Zhilino is located 14 km southwest of Vologda (the district's administrative centre) by road. Tropino is the nearest rural locality.
