= Ilmovik =

Ilmovik Ильмовик
- Village
- Location within Vologda Oblast Location within Russia
- Coordinates: 58°52′N 38°39′E
- Country: Russia
- Region: Vologda Oblast
- District: Cherepovetsky District
- Time zone: UTC+3:00

Ilmovik (Russian: Ильмовик) is a rural locality (a village) in Yugskoye Rural Settlement, Cherepovetsky District, Vologda Oblast, Russia. The population was 44 as of 2002.

== Geography ==
Ilmovik is located 62 km (39 mi) southeast of Cherepovets (the district's administrative centre) by road. Dubnishnoye is the nearest rural locality.
