= Ionovo =

Ionovo Ионово
- Village
- Location within Vologda Oblast Location within Russia
- Coordinates: 58°44′N 37°44′E
- Country: Russia
- Region: Vologda Oblast
- District: Cherepovetsky District
- Time zone: UTC+3:00

Ionovo (Russian: Ионово) is a rural locality (a village) in Yagnitskoye Rural Settlement, Cherepovetsky District, Vologda Oblast, Russia. The population was 11 as of 2002.

== Geography ==
Ionovo is located 108 km (67 mi) south of Cherepovets (the district's administrative centre) by road. Grigoryevo is the nearest locality. named after the ion of a charged atom
