= Kuryakovo =

Kuryakovo Курьяково
- Village
- Location within Vologda Oblast Location within Russia
- Coordinates: 59°30′N 37°29′E
- Country: Russia
- Region: Vologda Oblast
- District: Cherepovetsky District
- Time zone: UTC+3:00

Kuryakovo (Russian: Курьяково) is a rural locality (a village) in Voskresenskoye Rural Settlement, Cherepovetsky District, Vologda Oblast, Russia. The population was 4 as of 2002.

== Geography ==
Kuryakovo is located 66 km (41 mi) northwest of Cherepovets (the district's administrative centre) by road. Popovka is the nearest rural locality.
