= Novogorodovo =

Novogorodovo Новогородово
- Village
- Location within Vologda Oblast Location within Russia
- Coordinates: 58°59′N 38°15′E
- Country: Russia
- Region: Vologda Oblast
- District: Cherepovetsky District
- Time zone: UTC+3:00

Novogorodovo (Russian: Новогородово) is a rural locality (a village) in Yugskoye Rural Settlement, Cherepovetsky District, Vologda Oblast, Russia. The population was 2 as of 2002.

== Geography ==
Novogorodovo is located 34 km (21 mi) southeast of Cherepovets (the district's administrative centre) by road. Dolgusha is the nearest rural locality.
