= Ostyunino, Vologodsky District, Vologda Oblast =

Ostyunino Остюнино
- Village
- Location within Vologda Oblast Location within Russia
- Coordinates: 59°12′N 39°13′E
- Country: Russia
- Region: Vologda Oblast
- District: Vologodsky District
- Time zone: UTC+3:00

Ostyunino (Russian: Остюнино) is a rural locality (a village) in Staroselskoye Rural Settlement, Vologodsky District, Vologda Oblast, Russia. The population was 16 as of 2002.

== Geography ==
Ostyunino is located 46 km west of Vologda (the district's administrative centre) by road. Anchakovo is the nearest rural locality.
