= Rodiontsevo =

Rodiontsevo Родионцево
- Village
- Location within Vologda Oblast Location within Russia
- Coordinates: 59°10′N 39°50′E
- Country: Russia
- Region: Vologda Oblast
- District: Vologodsky District
- Time zone: UTC+3:00

Rodiontsevo (Russian: Родионцево) is a rural locality (a village) in Spasskoye Rural Settlement, Vologodsky District, Vologda Oblast, Russia. The population was 14 as of 2002. There are 48 streets.

== Geography ==
Rodiontsevo is located 6 km southwest of Vologda (the district's administrative centre) by road. Burtsevo is the nearest rural locality.
