= Strelkovo, Vologodsky District, Vologda Oblast =

Strelkovo Стрелково
- Village
- Location within Vologda Oblast Location within Russia
- Coordinates: 59°18′N 39°30′E
- Country: Russia
- Region: Vologda Oblast
- District: Vologodsky District
- Time zone: UTC+3:00

Strelkovo (Russian: Стрелково) is a rural locality (a village) in Mayskoye Rural Settlement, Vologodsky District, Vologda Oblast, Russia. The population was 19 as of 2002.

== Geography ==
Strelkovo is located 26 km northwest of Vologda (the district's administrative centre) by road. Goncharka is the nearest rural locality.
