= Tatarovo, Vologodsky District, Vologda Oblast =

Tatarovo Татарово
- Village
- Location within Vologda Oblast Location within Russia
- Coordinates: 59°22′N 39°29′E
- Country: Russia
- Region: Vologda Oblast
- District: Vologodsky District
- Time zone: UTC+3:00

Tatarovo (Russian: Татарово) is a rural locality (a village) in Kubenskoye Rural Settlement, Vologodsky District, Vologda Oblast, Russia. The population was 11 as of 2002.

== Geography ==
Tatarovo is located 42 km northwest of Vologda (the district's administrative centre) by road. Pavlovo is the nearest rural locality.
