= Titovo, Cherepovetsky District, Vologda Oblast =

Titovo Титово
- Village
- Location within Vologda Oblast Location within Russia
- Coordinates: 59°30′N 38°02′E
- Country: Russia
- Region: Vologda Oblast
- District: Cherepovetsky District
- Time zone: UTC+3:00

Titovo (Russian: Титово) is a rural locality (a village) in Voskresenskoye Rural Settlement, Cherepovetsky District, Vologda Oblast, Russia. The population was 1 as of 2002.

== Geography ==
Titovo is located 52 km northeast of Cherepovets (the district's administrative centre) by road. Yagodnaya is the nearest rural locality.
