= Ulazorsky =

Ulazorsky Улазорский
- Settlement
- Location within Vologda Oblast Location within Russia
- Coordinates: 59°33′N 37°23′E
- Country: Russia
- Region: Vologda Oblast
- District: Cherepovetsky District
- Time zone: UTC+3:00

Ulazorsky (Russian: Улазорский) is a rural locality (a settlement) in Voskresenskoye Rural Settlement, Cherepovetsky District, Vologda Oblast, Russia. The population was 83 as of 2002.

== Geography ==
Ulazorsky is located 75 km northwest of Cherepovets (the district's administrative centre) by road. Kozlovo is the nearest rural locality.
