= Chastobovo =

Chastobovo Частобово
- Village
- Location within Vologda Oblast Location within Russia
- Coordinates: 59°22′N 38°01′E
- Country: Russia
- Region: Vologda Oblast
- District: Cherepovetsky District
- Time zone: UTC+3:00

Chastobovo (Russian: Частобово) is a rural locality (a village) in the Klimovksoye Rural Settlement, Cherepovetsky District, Vologda Oblast, Russia. The population was 40 as of 2002.

== Geography ==
Chastobovo is located 33 km (21 mi) northeast of Cherepovets (the district's administrative centre) by road. Vasilyevskoye is the nearest rural locality.
