= Dementyevo =

Dementyevo Дементьево
- Village
- Location within Vologda Oblast Location within Russia
- Coordinates: 59°13′N 37°53′E
- Country: Russia
- Region: Vologda Oblast
- District: Cherepovetsky District
- Time zone: UTC+3:00

Dementyevo (Russian: Дементьево) is a rural locality (a village) in Malechkinskoye Rural Settlement, Cherepovetsky District, Vologda Oblast, Russia. The population was 4 as of 2002.

== Geography ==
Dementyevo is located 15 km (9.3 mi) north of Cherepovets (the district's administrative centre) by road. Zayakoshye is the nearest rural locality.
