= Dyakontsevo =

Dyakontsevo Дьяконцево
- Village
- Location within Vologda Oblast Location within Russia
- Coordinates: 59°31′N 39°14′E
- Country: Russia
- Region: Vologda Oblast
- District: Vologodsky District
- Time zone: UTC+3:00

Dyakontsevo (Russian: Дьяконцево) is a rural locality (a village) in Novlenskoye Rural Settlement, Vologodsky District, Vologda Oblast, Russia. The population was 2 as of 2002.

== Geography ==
Dyakontsevo is located 80 km northwest of Vologda (the district's administrative centre) by road. Laskovtsevo is the nearest rural locality.
