= Kornigovka =

Kornigovka Корниговка
- Village
- Location within Vologda Oblast Location within Russia
- Coordinates: 58°44′N 38°30′E
- Country: Russia
- Region: Vologda Oblast
- District: Cherepovetsky District
- Time zone: UTC+3:00

Kornigovka (Russian: Корниговка) is a rural locality (a village) in Myaksinskoye Rural Settlement, Cherepovetsky District, Vologda Oblast, Russia. The population was 1 as of 2002.

== Geography ==
Kornigovka is located 64 km (40 mi) southeast of Cherepovets (the district's administrative centre) by road. Polezhayevo is the nearest rural locality.
