= Kryukovo, Vologodsky District, Vologda Oblast =

Kryukovo Крюково
- Village
- Location within Vologda Oblast Location within Russia
- Coordinates: 59°37′N 39°13′E
- Country: Russia
- Region: Vologda Oblast
- District: Vologodsky District
- Time zone: UTC+3:00

Kryukovo (Russian: Крюково) is a rural locality (a village) in Novlenskoye Rural Settlement, Vologodsky District, Vologda Oblast, Russia. The population was 3 as of 2002.

== Geography ==
Kryukovo is located 34 km northwest of Vologda (the district's administrative centre) by road. Beketovo is the nearest rural locality.
