= Pogorelovo, Kubenskoye Rural Settlement, Vologodsky District, Vologda Oblast =

Pogorelovo Погорелово
- Village
- Location within Vologda Oblast Location within Russia
- Coordinates: 59°25′N 39°42′E
- Country: Russia
- Region: Vologda Oblast
- District: Vologodsky District
- Time zone: UTC+3:00

Pogorelovo (Russian: Погорелово) is a rural locality (a village) in Kubenskoye Rural Settlement, Vologodsky District, Vologda Oblast, Russia. The population was 15 as of 2002.

== Geography ==
The distance to Vologda is 32 km, to Kubenskoye is 2 km.
