= Pribytkovo, Novlenskoye Rural Settlement, Vologodsky District, Vologda Oblast =

Pribytkovo Прибытково
- Village
- Location within Vologda Oblast Location within Russia
- Coordinates: 59°40′N 39°01′E
- Country: Russia
- Region: Vologda Oblast
- District: Vologodsky District
- Time zone: UTC+3:00

Pribytkovo (Russian: Прибытково) is a rural locality (a village) in Novlenskoye Rural Settlement, Vologodsky District, Vologda Oblast, Russia. The population was 4 as of 2002.

== Geography ==
The distance to Vologda is 96 km, to Novlenskoye is 18 km.
