= Prokhorovo, Vologda Oblast =

Prokhorovo Прохорово
- Village
- Location within Vologda Oblast Location within Russia
- Coordinates: 59°09′N 39°30′E
- Country: Russia
- Region: Vologda Oblast
- District: Vologodsky District
- Time zone: UTC+3:00

Prokhorovo (Russian: Прохорово) is a rural locality (a village) in Sosnovskoye Rural Settlement, Vologodsky District, Vologda Oblast, Russia. The population was 13 as of 2002.

== Geography ==
Prokhorovo is located 26 km southwest of Vologda (the district's administrative centre) by road. Pirogovo is the nearest rural locality.
