= Seltsa =

Seltsa Сельца
- Village
- Location within Vologda Oblast Location within Russia
- Coordinates: 59°11′N 37°50′E
- Country: Russia
- Region: Vologda Oblast
- District: Cherepovetsky District
- Time zone: UTC+3:00

Seltsa (Russian: Сельца) is a rural locality (a village) in Tonshalovskoye Rural Settlement, Cherepovetsky District, Vologda Oblast, Russia. The population was 53 as of 2002. There are 2 streets.

== Geography ==
Seltsa is located 12 km northwest of Cherepovets (the district's administrative centre) by road. Bolshoy Dvor is the nearest rural locality.
