= Solmanskoye =

Solmanskoye Солманское
- Village
- Location within Vologda Oblast Location within Russia
- Coordinates: 59°10′N 37°57′E
- Country: Russia
- Region: Vologda Oblast
- District: Cherepovetsky District
- Time zone: UTC+3:00

Solmanskoye (Russian: Солманское) is a rural locality (a village) in Tonshalovskoye Rural Settlement, Cherepovetsky District, Vologda Oblast, Russia. The population was 104 as of 2002. There are five streets.

== Geography ==
Solmanskoye is located 9 km northeast of Cherepovets (the district's administrative centre) by road. Gorka is the nearest rural locality.
