= Yefimovo, Vologodsky District, Vologda Oblast =

Yefimovo Ефимово
- Village
- Location within Vologda Oblast Location within Russia
- Coordinates: 59°26′N 39°11′E
- Country: Russia
- Region: Vologda Oblast
- District: Vologodsky District
- Time zone: UTC+3:00

Yefimovo (Russian: Ефимово) is a rural locality (a village) in Kubenskoye Rural Settlement, Vologodsky District, Vologda Oblast, Russia. The population was 3 as of 2002.

== Geography ==
Yefimovo is located 71 km northwest of Vologda (the district's administrative centre) by road. Babik is the nearest rural locality.
