= Balobanovo =

Balobanovo Балобаново
- Village
- Location within Vologda Oblast Location within Russia
- Coordinates: 59°34′N 39°08′E
- Country: Russia
- Region: Vologda Oblast
- District: Vologodsky District
- Time zone: UTC+3:00

Balobanovo (Russian: Балобаново) is a rural locality (a village) in Novlenskoye Rural Settlement, Vologodsky District, Vologda Oblast, Russia. The population was 36 as of 2002.

== Geography ==
Balobanovo is located 75 km northwest of Vologda (the district's administrative centre) by road. Osinovka is the nearest locality. the area is named after the village, an unusual story happened there
