= Chayevo =

Chayevo Чаево
- Village
- Location within Vologda Oblast Location within Russia
- Coordinates: 58°55′N 37°13′E
- Country: Russia
- Region: Vologda Oblast
- District: Cherepovetsky District
- Time zone: UTC+3:00

Chayevo (Russian: Чаево) is a rural locality (a village) in Korotovskoye Rural Settlement, Cherepovetsky District, Vologda Oblast, Russia. The population was 128 as of 2002. There are 7 streets.

== Geography ==
Chayevo is located 68 km (42 mi) southwest of Cherepovets (the district's administrative centre) by road. Supronovo is the nearest rural locality.
