= Chikeyevo =

Chikeyevo Чикеево
- Village
- Location within Vologda Oblast Location within Russia
- Coordinates: 58°50′N 38°52′E
- Country: Russia
- Region: Vologda Oblast
- District: Cherepovetsky District
- Time zone: UTC+3:00

Chikeyevo (Russian: Чикеево) is a rural locality (a village) in Yugskoye Rural Settlement, Cherepovetsky District, Vologda Oblast, Russia. The population was 41 as of 2002.

== Geography ==
Chikeyevo is located 77 km (48 mi) southeast of Cherepovets (the district's administrative centre) by road. Seltso is the nearest rural locality.
