= Korotnevo =

Korotnevo Коротнево
- Village
- Location within Vologda Oblast Location within Russia
- Coordinates: 59°21′N 37°59′E
- Country: Russia
- Region: Vologda Oblast
- District: Cherepovetsky District
- Time zone: UTC+3:00

Korotnevo (Russian: Коротнево) is a rural locality (a village) in Voskresenskoye Rural Settlement, Cherepovetsky District, Vologda Oblast, Russia. The population was 6 as of 2002.

== Geography ==
Korotnevo is located 35 km (22 mi) northeast of Cherepovets (the district's administrative centre) by road. Popovskoye is the nearest rural locality.
