= Neverovskoye =

Neverovskoye Неверовское
- Village
- Location within Vologda Oblast Location within Russia
- Coordinates: 59°02′N 40°07′E
- Country: Russia
- Region: Vologda Oblast
- District: Vologodsky District
- Time zone: UTC+3:00

Neverovskoye (Russian: Неверовское) is a rural locality (a village) in Podlesnoye Rural Settlement, Vologodsky District, Vologda Oblast, Russia. The population was 9 as of 2002. There are 2 streets.

== Geography ==
Neverovskoye is located 27 km southeast of Vologda (the district's administrative centre) by road. Nikultsevo is the nearest rural locality.
