= Pastoch =

Pastoch Пасточ
- Village
- Location within Vologda Oblast Location within Russia
- Coordinates: 59°23′N 38°14′E
- Country: Russia
- Region: Vologda Oblast
- District: Cherepovetsky District
- Time zone: UTC+3:00

Pastoch (Russian: Пасточ) is a rural locality (a village) in Yaganovskoye Rural Settlement, Cherepovetsky District, Vologda Oblast, Russia. The population was 15 as of 2002.

== Geography ==
Pastoch is located 48 km (30 mi) northeast of Cherepovets (the district's administrative centre) by road. Nizhny Angoboy is the nearest rural locality.
