= Pogost Onochest =

Pogost Onochest Погост Оночесть
- Village
- Location within Vologda Oblast Location within Russia
- Coordinates: 59°19′N 39°01′E
- Country: Russia
- Region: Vologda Oblast
- District: Vologodsky District
- Time zone: UTC+3:00

Pogost Onochest (Russian: Погост Оночесть) is a rural locality (a village) in Staroselskoye Rural Settlement, Vologodsky District, Vologda Oblast, Russia. The population was 13 as of 2002.

== Geography ==
Pogost Onochest is located 71 km northwest of Vologda (the district's administrative centre) by road. Popadyino is the nearest rural locality.
