= Shepelevo, Vologda Oblast =

Shepelevo Шепелево
- Village
- Location within Vologda Oblast Location within Russia
- Coordinates: 58°41′N 37°46′E
- Country: Russia
- Region: Vologda Oblast
- District: Cherepovetsky District
- Time zone: UTC+3:00

Shepelevo (Russian: Шепелево) is a rural locality (a village) in Yagnitskoye Rural Settlement, Cherepovetsky District, Vologda Oblast, Russia. The population was 41 as of 2002.

== Geography ==
Shepelevo is located 109 km south of Cherepovets (the district's administrative centre) by road. Nikulino is the nearest rural locality.
