= Sholokhovo =

Sholokhovo Шолохово
- Village
- Location within Vologda Oblast Location within Russia
- Coordinates: 59°33′N 39°26′E
- Country: Russia
- Region: Vologda Oblast
- District: Vologodsky District
- Time zone: UTC+3:00

Sholokhovo (Russian: Шолохово) is a rural locality (a village) in Novlenskoye Rural Settlement, Vologodsky District, Vologda Oblast, Russia. The population was 133 as of 2002. There are 4 streets.

== Geography ==
Sholokhovo is located 50 km northwest of Vologda (the district's administrative centre) by road. Ostretsovo is the nearest rural locality.
