= Vysokovo-2 =

Vysokovo-2 Высоково-2
- Village
- Location within Vologda Oblast Location within Russia
- Coordinates: 59°37′N 39°09′E
- Country: Russia
- Region: Vologda Oblast
- District: Vologodsky District
- Time zone: UTC+3:00

Vysokovo-2 (Russian: Высоково-2) is a rural locality (a village) in Novlenskoye Rural Settlement, Vologodsky District, Vologda Oblast, Russia. The population was 11 as of 2002.

== Geography ==
Vysokovo-2 is located 78 km northwest of Vologda (the district's administrative centre) by road. Natsepino is the nearest rural locality.
