= Yerofeyka =

Yerofeyka Ерофейка
- Village
- Location within Vologda Oblast Location within Russia
- Coordinates: 59°11′N 39°33′E
- Country: Russia
- Region: Vologda Oblast
- District: Vologodsky District
- Time zone: UTC+3:00

Yerofeyka (Russian: Ерофейка) is a rural locality (a village) in Sosnovskoye Rural Settlement, Vologodsky District, Vologda Oblast, Russia. The population was 144 as of 2002. There are 9 streets.

== Geography ==
Yerofeyka is located 22 km southwest of Vologda (the district's administrative centre) by road. Lapach is the nearest rural locality.
