= Yevlashevo, Vologda Oblast =

Yevlashevo Евлашево
- Village
- Location within Vologda Oblast Location within Russia
- Coordinates: 59°28′N 39°36′E
- Country: Russia
- Region: Vologda Oblast
- District: Vologodsky District
- Time zone: UTC+3:00

Yevlashevo (Russian: Евлашево) is a rural locality (a village) in Kubenskoye Rural Settlement, Vologodsky District, Vologda Oblast, Russia. The population was 27 as of 2002.

== Geography ==
Yevlashevo is located 36 km northwest of Vologda (the district's administrative centre) by road. Derevkovo is the nearest rural locality.
