= Dikaya =

Dikaya Дикая
- Station
- Location within Vologda Oblast Location within Russia
- Coordinates: 59°14′N 39°29′E
- Country: Russia
- Region: Vologda Oblast
- District: Vologodsky District
- Time zone: UTC+3:00

Dikaya (Russian: Дикая) is a rural locality (a station) in Mayskoye Rural Settlement, Vologodsky District, Vologda Oblast, Russia. The population was 274 as of 2002. There are 2 streets.

== Geography ==
Dikaya is located 28 km west of Vologda (the district's administrative centre) by road. Markovo, Gorka is the nearest locality, Mesha is the nearest creek.
