= Dityatyevo =

Dityatyevo Дитятьево
- Village
- Location within Vologda Oblast Location within Russia
- Coordinates: 59°16′N 39°37′E
- Country: Russia
- Region: Vologda Oblast
- District: Vologodsky District
- Time zone: UTC+3:00

Dityatyevo (Russian: Дитятьево) is a rural locality (a village) in Mayskoye Rural Settlement, Vologodsky District, Vologda Oblast, Russia. The population was 94 as of 2002. There are 2 streets.

== Geography ==
Dityatyevo is located 19 km northwest of Vologda (the district's administrative centre) by road. Akulovo is the nearest rural locality.
