= Karmanitsa =

Karmanitsa Карманица
- Village
- Location within Vologda Oblast Location within Russia
- Coordinates: 59°11′N 37°40′E
- Country: Russia
- Region: Vologda Oblast
- District: Cherepovetsky District
- Time zone: UTC+3:00

Karmanitsa (Russian: Карманица) is a rural locality (a village) in Nelazskoye Rural Settlement, Cherepovetsky District, Vologda Oblast, Russia. The population was 6 as of 2002.

== Geography ==
Karmanitsa is located 24 km (15 mi) northwest of Cherepovets (the district's administrative centre) by road. Popovka is the nearest rural locality.
