= Koltseyevo =

Koltseyevo Кольцеево
- Village
- Location within Vologda Oblast Location within Russia
- Coordinates: 59°31′N 39°31′E
- Country: Russia
- Region: Vologda Oblast
- District: Vologodsky District
- Time zone: UTC+3:00

Koltseyevo (Russian: Кольцеево) is a rural locality (a village) in Kubenskoye Rural Settlement, Vologodsky District, Vologda Oblast, Russia. The population was 66 as of 2002. There are 14 streets.

== Geography ==
Koltseyevo is located 43 km northwest of Vologda (the district's administrative centre) by road. Novoye is the nearest rural locality.
