= Laskovtsevo =

Laskovtsevo Ласковцево
- Village
- Location within Vologda Oblast Location within Russia
- Coordinates: 59°31′N 39°12′E
- Country: Russia
- Region: Vologda Oblast
- District: Vologodsky District
- Time zone: UTC+3:00

Laskovtsevo (Russian: Ласковцево) is a rural locality (a village) in Novlenskoye Rural Settlement, Vologodsky District, Vologda Oblast, Russia. The population was 17 as of 2002.

== Geography ==
Laskovtsevo is located 77 km northwest of Vologda (the district's administrative centre) by road. Dyakontsevo is the nearest rural locality.
