= Lavrentyevo =

Lavrentyevo Лаврентьево
- Village
- Location within Vologda Oblast Location within Russia
- Coordinates: 59°27′N 39°10′E
- Country: Russia
- Region: Vologda Oblast
- District: Vologodsky District
- Time zone: UTC+3:00

Lavrentyevo (Russian: Лаврентьево) is a rural locality (a village) in Kubenskoye Rural Settlement, Vologodsky District, Vologda Oblast, Russia. The population was 2 as of 2002.

== Geography ==
Lavrentyevo is located 66 km northwest of Vologda (the district's administrative centre) by road. Popovskoye is the nearest rural locality.
