= Mikhaltsevo =

Mikhaltsevo Михальцево
- Village
- Location within Vologda Oblast Location within Russia
- Coordinates: 59°14′N 39°48′E
- Country: Russia
- Region: Vologda Oblast
- District: Vologodsky District
- Time zone: UTC+3:00

Mikhaltsevo (Russian: Михальцево) is a rural locality (a village) in Mayskoye Rural Settlement, Vologodsky District, Vologda Oblast, Russia. The population was 42 as of 2002.

== Geography ==
Mikhaltsevo is located 8 km northwest of Vologda (the district's administrative centre) by road. Sulinskoye is the nearest rural locality.
