= Minino, Kubenskoye Rural Settlement, Vologodsky District, Vologda Oblast =

Minino Минино
- Village
- Location within Vologda Oblast Location within Russia
- Coordinates: 59°22′N 39°23′E
- Country: Russia
- Region: Vologda Oblast
- District: Vologodsky District
- Time zone: UTC+3:00

Minino (Russian: Минино) is a rural locality (a village) in Kubenskoye Rural Settlement, Vologodsky District, Vologda Oblast, Russia. The population was 42 as of 2002.

== Geography ==
The distance to Vologda is 45 km, to Kubenskoye is 17 km. Voronino is the nearest rural locality.
