= Ostakhovo =

Ostakhovo Остахово
- Selo
- Location within Vologda Oblast Location within Russia
- Coordinates: 59°22′N 39°30′E
- Country: Russia
- Region: Vologda Oblast
- District: Vologodsky District
- Time zone: UTC+3:00

Ostakhovo (Russian: Остахово) is a rural locality (a selo) in Kubenskoye Rural Settlement, Vologodsky District, Vologda Oblast, Russia. The population was 543 as of 2002. There are 6 streets.

== Geography ==
Ostakhovo is located 40 km northwest of Vologda (the district's administrative centre) by road. Pavlovo is the nearest rural locality.
