= Pakhtalovo =

Pakhtalovo Пахталово
- Village
- Location within Vologda Oblast Location within Russia
- Coordinates: 59°10′N 39°23′E
- Country: Russia
- Region: Vologda Oblast
- District: Vologodsky District
- Time zone: UTC+3:00

Pakhtalovo (Russian: Пахталово) is a rural locality (a village) in Staroselskoye Rural Settlement, Vologodsky District, Vologda Oblast, Russia. The population was three in 2002.

== Geography ==
Pakhtalovo is located 33 kilometres (21 mi) west of Vologda (the district's administrative centre) by road. Obukhovo is the nearest rural locality.
