= Petrushino, Vologodsky District, Vologda Oblast =

Petrushino Петрушино
- Village
- Location within Vologda Oblast Location within Russia
- Coordinates: 59°20′N 39°21′E
- Country: Russia
- Region: Vologda Oblast
- District: Vologodsky District
- Time zone: UTC+3:00

Petrushino (Russian: Петрушино) is a rural locality (a village) in Kubenskoye Rural Settlement, Vologodsky District, Vologda Oblast, Russia. The population was 8 as of 2002.

== Geography ==
Petrushino is located 57 km northwest of Vologda (the district's administrative centre) by road. Berezovka is the nearest rural locality.
