= Shalimovo =

Shalimovo Шалимово
- Village
- Location within Vologda Oblast Location within Russia
- Coordinates: 58°58′N 38°36′E
- Country: Russia
- Region: Vologda Oblast
- District: Cherepovetsky District
- Time zone: UTC+3:00

Shalimovo (Russian: Шалимово) is a rural locality (a village) in Yugskoye Rural Settlement, Cherepovetsky District, Vologda Oblast, Russia. The population was 165 as of 2002. There are 6 streets.

== Geography ==
Shalimovo is located 56 km southeast of Cherepovets (the district's administrative centre) by road. Baynovo is the nearest rural locality.
