= Sidelnikovo =

Sidelnikovo Сидельниково
- Village
- Location within Vologda Oblast Location within Russia
- Coordinates: 59°09′N 39°16′E
- Country: Russia
- Region: Vologda Oblast
- District: Vologodsky District
- Time zone: UTC+3:00

Sidelnikovo (Russian: Сидельниково) is a rural locality (a village) in Staroselskoye Rural Settlement, Vologodsky District, Vologda Oblast, Russia. The population was 4 as of 2002.

== Geography ==
Sidelnikovo is located 45 km southwest of Vologda (the district's administrative centre) by road. Kotelnikovo is the nearest rural locality.
