= Tyutryumovo =

Tyutryumovo Тютрюмово
- Village
- Location within Vologda Oblast Location within Russia
- Coordinates: 59°41′N 38°58′E
- Country: Russia
- Region: Vologda Oblast
- District: Vologodsky District
- Time zone: UTC+3:00

Tyutryumovo (Russian: Тютрюмово) is a rural locality (a village) in Novlenskoye Rural Settlement, Vologodsky District, Vologda Oblast, Russia. The population was 4 as of 2002.

== Geography ==
Tyutryumovo is located 88 km northwest of Vologda (the district's administrative centre) by road. Omogayevo is the nearest rural locality.
