= Yeltukhovo =

Yeltukhovo Елтухово
- Village
- Location within Vologda Oblast Location within Russia
- Coordinates: 59°24′N 37°25′E
- Country: Russia
- Region: Vologda Oblast
- District: Cherepovetsky District
- Time zone: UTC+3:00

Yeltukhovo (Russian: Елтухово) is a rural locality (a village) in Abakanovskoye Rural Settlement, Cherepovetsky District, Vologda Oblast, Russia. The population was 8 as of 2002.

== Geography ==
Yeltukhovo is located 58 km northwest of Cherepovets (the district's administrative centre) by road. Dora is the nearest rural locality.
