= Yelyakhino =

Yelyakhino Еляхино
- Village
- Location within Vologda Oblast Location within Russia
- Coordinates: 58°57′N 38°10′E
- Country: Russia
- Region: Vologda Oblast
- District: Cherepovetsky District
- Time zone: UTC+3:00

Yelyakhino (Russian: Еляхино) is a rural locality (a village) in Myaksinskoye Rural Settlement, Cherepovetsky District, Vologda Oblast, Russia. The population was 7 as of 2002.

== Geography ==
Yelyakhino is located 30 km southeast of Cherepovets (the district's administrative centre) by road. Kostyayevo is the nearest rural locality.
