= Zuyevo, Vologodsky District, Vologda Oblast =

Zuyevo Зуево
- Village
- Location within Vologda Oblast Location within Russia
- Coordinates: 59°12′N 39°18′E
- Country: Russia
- Region: Vologda Oblast
- District: Vologodsky District
- Time zone: UTC+3:00

Zuyevo (Russian: Зуево) is a rural locality (a village) in Staroselskoye Rural Settlement, Vologodsky District, Vologda Oblast, Russia. The population was 9 as of 2002.

== Geography ==
Zuyevo is located 42 km west of Vologda (the district's administrative centre) by road. Striznevo is the nearest rural locality.
