= Borilovo-2 =

Borilovo-2 Борилово-2
- Village
- Location within Vologda Oblast Location within Russia
- Coordinates: 59°19′N 39°54′E
- Country: Russia
- Region: Vologda Oblast
- District: Vologodsky District
- Time zone: UTC+3:00

Borilovo-2 (Russian: Борилово-2) is a rural locality (a village) in Prilukskoye Rural Settlement, Vologodsky District, Vologda Oblast, Russia. The population was 2 as of 2002.

== Geography ==
Borilovo-2 is located 15 km north of Vologda (the district's administrative centre) by road. Semenkovo-2 is the nearest rural locality.
