= Chuksha =

Chuksha Чукша
- Village
- Location within Vologda Oblast Location within Russia
- Coordinates: 59°28′N 37°57′E
- Country: Russia
- Region: Vologda Oblast
- District: Cherepovetsky District
- Time zone: UTC+3:00

Chuksha (Russian: Чукша) is a rural locality (a village) in Voskresenskoye Rural Settlement, Cherepovetsky District, Vologda Oblast, Russia. The population was 10 as of 2002.

== Geography ==
Chuksha is located 46 km (29 mi) northeast of Cherepovets (the district's administrative centre) by road. Staroye Zakharovo is the nearest rural locality.
