= Dorozhny, Vologda Oblast =

Dorozhny Дорожный
- Settlement
- Location within Vologda Oblast Location within Russia
- Coordinates: 59°17′N 39°55′E
- Country: Russia
- Region: Vologda Oblast
- District: Vologodsky District
- Time zone: UTC+3:00

Dorozhny (Russian: Дорожный) is a rural locality (a settlement) in Prilukskoye Rural Settlement, Vologodsky District, Vologda Oblast, Russia. The population was 601 as of 2002.

== Geography ==
Dorozhny is located 11 km northeast of Vologda (the district's administrative centre) by road. Grishino is the nearest rural locality.
