= Gurlevo =

Gurlevo Гурлево
- Village
- Location within Vologda Oblast Location within Russia
- Coordinates: 58°48′N 38°51′E
- Country: Russia
- Region: Vologda Oblast
- District: Cherepovetsky District
- Time zone: UTC+3:00

Gurlevo (Russian: Гурлево) is a rural locality (a village) in Yugskoye Rural Settlement, Cherepovetsky District, Vologda Oblast, Russia. The population was 17 as of 2002.

== Geography ==
Gurlevo is located 81 km (50 mi) southeast of Cherepovets (the district's administrative centre) by road. Izbnaya is the nearest rural locality.
