= Ivlevskoye =

Ivlevskoye Ивлевское
- Village
- Location within Vologda Oblast Location within Russia
- Coordinates: 59°44′N 39°03′E
- Country: Russia
- Region: Vologda Oblast
- District: Vologodsky District
- Time zone: UTC+3:00

Ivlevskoye (Russian: Ивлевское) is a rural locality (a village) in Novlenskoye Rural Settlement, Vologodsky District, Vologda Oblast, Russia. The population was 25 as of 2002.

== Geography ==
Ivlevskoye is located 81 km northwest of Vologda (the district's administrative centre) by road. Pervomaysky is the nearest rural locality.
