= Kodino, Vologda Oblast =

Kodino Кодино
- Village
- Location within Vologda Oblast Location within Russia
- Coordinates: 58°49′N 38°25′E
- Country: Russia
- Region: Vologda Oblast
- District: Cherepovetsky District
- Time zone: UTC+3:00

Kodino (Russian: Кодино) is a rural locality (a village) in Myaksinskoye Rural Settlement, Cherepovetsky District, Vologda Oblast, Russia. The population was 26 as of 2002.

== Geography ==
Kodino is located 52 km (32 mi) southeast of Cherepovets (the district's administrative centre) by road. Frolovo is the nearest rural locality.
