= Kolyshkino, Vologda Oblast =

Kolyshkino Колышкино
- Village
- Location within Vologda Oblast Location within Russia
- Coordinates: 59°45′N 39°04′E
- Country: Russia
- Region: Vologda Oblast
- District: Vologodsky District
- Time zone: UTC+3:00

Kolyshkino (Russian: Колышкино) is a rural locality (a village) in Novlenskoye Rural Settlement, Vologodsky District, Vologda Oblast, Russia. The population was 23 as of 2002.

== Geography ==
Kolyshkino is located 80 km northwest of Vologda (the district's administrative centre) by road. Popovo is the nearest rural locality.
