= Kozitsyno =

Kozitsyno Козицыно
- Village
- Location within Vologda Oblast Location within Russia
- Coordinates: 59°08′N 39°53′E
- Country: Russia
- Region: Vologda Oblast
- District: Vologodsky District
- Time zone: UTC+3:00

Kozitsyno (Russian: Козицыно) is a rural locality (a village) in Sosnovskoye Rural Settlement, Vologodsky District, Vologda Oblast, Russia. The population was 9 as of 2002. There are 2 streets.

== Geography ==
Kozitsyno is located 9 km southwest of Vologda (the district's administrative centre) by road. Popovka is the nearest rural locality.
