= Mydyevo =

Mydyevo Мыдьево
- Village
- Location within Vologda Oblast Location within Russia
- Coordinates: 58°54′N 38°44′E
- Country: Russia
- Region: Vologda Oblast
- District: Cherepovetsky District
- Time zone: UTC+3:00

Mydyevo (Russian: Мыдьево) is a rural locality (a village) in Yugskoye Rural Settlement, Cherepovetsky District, Vologda Oblast, Russia. The population was 11 as of 2002.

== Geography ==
Mydyevo is located 67 km (42 mi) southeast of Cherepovets (the district's administrative centre) by road. Timovo is the nearest rural locality.
