= Perkhino =

Perkhino Перхино
- Village
- Location within Vologda Oblast Location within Russia
- Coordinates: 59°22′N 38°02′E
- Country: Russia
- Region: Vologda Oblast
- District: Cherepovetsky District
- Time zone: UTC+3:00

Perkhino (Russian: Перхино) is a rural locality (a village) and the administrative center of Klimovskoye Rural Settlement, Cherepovetsky District, Vologda Oblast, Russia. The population was 1 as of 2002.

== Geography ==
Perkhino is located 35 km (22 mi) northeast of Cherepovets (the district's administrative centre) by road. Grenevo is the nearest rural locality.
