= Trofankovo =

Trofankovo Трофанково
- Village
- Location within Vologda Oblast Location within Russia
- Coordinates: 58°52′N 37°20′E
- Country: Russia
- Region: Vologda Oblast
- District: Cherepovetsky District
- Time zone: UTC+3:00

Trofankovo (Russian: Трофанково) is a rural locality (a village) in Nikolo-Ramenskoye Rural Settlement, Cherepovetsky District, Vologda Oblast, Russia. The population was 12 as of 2022.

== Geography ==
Trofankovo is located 76 km southwest of Cherepovets (the district's administrative centre) by road. Kunshino is the nearest rural locality.
