= Zakukoboy =

Zakukoboy Закукобой
- Village
- Location within Vologda Oblast Location within Russia
- Coordinates: 59°35′N 37°15′E
- Country: Russia
- Region: Vologda Oblast
- District: Cherepovetsky District
- Time zone: UTC+3:00

Zakukoboy (Russian: Закукобой) is a rural locality (a village) in Voskresenskoye Rural Settlement, Cherepovetsky District, Vologda Oblast, Russia. The population was 6 as of 2002.

== Geography ==
Zakukoboy is located 83 km northwest of Cherepovets (the district's administrative centre) by road. Zakharovo is the nearest rural locality.
