= Zavidovo, Vologda Oblast =

Zavidovo Завидово
- Village
- Location within Vologda Oblast Location within Russia
- Coordinates: 58°52′N 38°34′E
- Country: Russia
- Region: Vologda Oblast
- District: Cherepovetsky District
- Time zone: UTC+3:00

Zavidovo (Russian: Завидово) is a rural locality (a village) in Yugskoye Rural Settlement, Cherepovetsky District, Vologda Oblast, Russia. The population was 22 as of 2002.

== Geography ==
Zavidovo is located 64 km southeast of Cherepovets (the district's administrative centre) by road. Maslovo is the nearest rural locality.
