= Braslavl =

Braslavl Браславль
- Village
- Location within Vologda Oblast Location within Russia
- Coordinates: 58°50′N 37°28′E
- Country: Russia
- Region: Vologda Oblast
- District: Cherepovetsky District
- Time zone: UTC+3:00

Braslavl (Russian: Браславль) is a rural locality (a village) in Nikolo-Ramenskoye Rural Settlement, Cherepovetsky District, Vologda Oblast, Russia. The population was 19 in 2002.

== Geography ==
Braslavl is located 78 km (48 mi) southwest of Cherepovets (the district's administrative centre) by road. Zarechye is the nearest rural locality.
