= Dargun, Vologda Oblast =

Dargun Даргун
- Village
- Location within Vologda Oblast Location within Russia
- Coordinates: 59°04′N 38°14′E
- Country: Russia
- Region: Vologda Oblast
- District: Cherepovetsky District
- Time zone: UTC+3:00

Dargun (Russian: Даргун) is a rural locality (a village) in Yugskoye Rural Settlement, Cherepovetsky District, Vologda Oblast, Russia. The population was 14 as of 2002.

== Geography ==
Dargun is located 55 km (34 mi) southeast of Cherepovets (the district's administrative centre) by road. Popovskoye is the nearest rural locality.
