= Fedosovo =

Fedosovo Федосово
- Village
- Location within Vologda Oblast Location within Russia
- Coordinates: 59°00′N 37°31′E
- Country: Russia
- Region: Vologda Oblast
- District: Cherepovetsky District
- Time zone: UTC+3:00

Fedosovo (Russian: Федосово) is a rural locality (a village) in Korotovskoye Rural Settlement, Cherepovetsky District, Vologda Oblast, Russia. The population was 16 as of 2002.

== Geography ==
Fedosovo is located 74 km (46 mi) southwest of Cherepovets (the district's administrative centre) by road. Dubrovo is the nearest rural locality.
