= Firyutino =

Firyutino Фирютино
- Village
- Location within Vologda Oblast Location within Russia
- Coordinates: 59°41′N 38°04′E
- Country: Russia
- Region: Vologda Oblast
- District: Cherepovetsky District
- Time zone: UTC+3:00

Firyutino (Russian: Фирютино) is a rural locality (a village) in Voskresenskoye Rural Settlement, Cherepovetsky District, Vologda Oblast, Russia. The population was 2 as of 2002.

== Geography ==
Firyutino is located 73 km (45 mi) northeast of Cherepovets (the district's administrative centre) by road. Nadporozhye is the nearest rural locality.
