= Frolkovo =

Frolkovo Фролково
- Village
- Location within Vologda Oblast Location within Russia
- Coordinates: 58°56′N 38°14′E
- Country: Russia
- Region: Vologda Oblast
- District: Cherepovetsky District
- Time zone: UTC+3:00

Frolkovo (Russian: Фролково) is a rural locality (a village) in Myaksinskoye Rural Settlement, Cherepovetsky District, Vologda Oblast, Russia. The population was 22 as of 2002.

== Geography ==
Frolkovo is located 35 km (22 mi) southeast of Cherepovets (the district's administrative centre) by road. Bykovo is the nearest rural locality.
