= Galinskoye =

Galinskoye Галинское
- Village
- Location within Vologda Oblast Location within Russia
- Coordinates: 59°40′N 38°08′E
- Country: Russia
- Region: Vologda Oblast
- District: Cherepovetsky District
- Time zone: UTC+3:00

Galinskoye (Russian: Галинское) is a rural locality (a village) in Voskresenskoye Rural Settlement, Cherepovetsky District, Vologda Oblast, Russia. The population was 3 as of 2002.

== Geography ==
Galinskoye is located 70 km (43 mi) northeast of Cherepovets (the district's administrative centre) by road. Zadunay is the nearest rural locality.
