= Glinskoye =

Glinskoye Глинское
- Village
- Location within Vologda Oblast Location within Russia
- Coordinates: 58°40′N 37°20′E
- Country: Russia
- Region: Vologda Oblast
- District: Cherepovetsky District
- Time zone: UTC+3:00

Glinskoye (Russian: Глинское) is a rural locality (a village) in Yagnitskoye Rural Settlement, Cherepovetsky District, Vologda Oblast, Russia. The population was 21 as of 2002.

== Geography ==
Glinskoye is located 108 km (67 mi) southwest of Cherepovets (the district's administrative centre) by road. Ramenye is the nearest rural locality.
