= Kindeyevo =

Kindeyevo Киндеево
- Village
- Location within Vologda Oblast Location within Russia
- Coordinates: 59°10′N 39°36′E
- Country: Russia
- Region: Vologda Oblast
- District: Vologodsky District
- Time zone: UTC+3:00

Kindeyevo (Russian: Киндеево) is a rural locality (a village) in Sosnovskoye Rural Settlement, Vologodsky District, Vologda Oblast, Russia. The population was 14 as of 2002. There are 3 streets.

== Geography ==
Kindeyevo is located 20 km west of Vologda (the district's administrative centre) by road. Isakovo is the nearest rural locality.
