= Kumino, Vologda Oblast =

Kumino Кумино
- Village
- Location within Vologda Oblast Location within Russia
- Coordinates: 59°27′N 37°40′E
- Country: Russia
- Region: Vologda Oblast
- District: Cherepovetsky District
- Time zone: UTC+3:00

Kumino (Russian: Кумино) is a rural locality (a village) in Voskresenskoye Rural Settlement, Cherepovetsky District, Vologda Oblast, Russia. The population was 5 as of 2002.

== Geography ==
Kumino is located 56 km (35 mi) northwest of Cherepovets (the district's administrative centre) by road. Afonino is the nearest rural locality.
