= Likhachevo =

Likhachevo Лихачево
- Village
- Location within Vologda Oblast Location within Russia
- Coordinates: 59°05′N 38°15′E
- Country: Russia
- Region: Vologda Oblast
- District: Cherepovetsky District
- Time zone: UTC+3:00

Likhachevo (Russian: Лихачево) is a rural locality (a village) in Yugskoye Rural Settlement, Cherepovetsky District, Vologda Oblast, Russia. The population was 23 as of 2002.

== Geography ==
Likhachevo is located 54 km (34 mi) east of Cherepovets (the district's administrative centre) by road. Maximovskoye is the nearest rural locality.
