= Stepantsevo =

Stepantsevo Степанцево
- Village
- Location within Vologda Oblast Location within Russia
- Coordinates: 58°53′N 38°16′E
- Country: Russia
- Region: Vologda Oblast
- District: Cherepovetsky District
- Time zone: UTC+3:00

Stepantsevo (Russian: Степанцево) is a rural locality (a village) in Myaksinskoye Rural Settlement, Cherepovetsky District, Vologda Oblast, Russia. The population was 23 as of 2002.

== Geography ==
Stepantsevo is located 41 km southeast of Cherepovets (the district's administrative centre) by road. Travlinka is the nearest rural locality.
