= Tyabunino =

Tyabunino Тябунино
- Village
- Location within Vologda Oblast Location within Russia
- Coordinates: 58°49′N 38°22′E
- Country: Russia
- Region: Vologda Oblast
- District: Cherepovetsky District
- Time zone: UTC+3:00

Tyabunino (Russian: Тябунино) is a rural locality (a village) in Myaksinskoye Rural Settlement, Cherepovetsky District, Vologda Oblast, Russia. The population was 17 as of 2002.

== Geography ==
Tyabunino is located 50 km southeast of Cherepovets (the district's administrative centre) by road. Vasilyevskoye is the nearest rural locality.
