= Yakonskoye =

Yakonskoye Яконское
- Village
- Location within Vologda Oblast Location within Russia
- Coordinates: 59°09′N 37°57′E
- Country: Russia
- Region: Vologda Oblast
- District: Cherepovetsky District
- Time zone: UTC+3:00

Yakonskoye (Russian: Яконское) is a rural locality (a village) in Tonshalovskoye Rural Settlement, Cherepovetsky District, Vologda Oblast, Russia. The population was 58 as of 2002.

== Geography ==
Yakonskoye is located 6 km northeast of Cherepovets (the district's administrative centre) by road. Cherepovets is the nearest rural locality.
