= Yeskino, Vologodsky District, Vologda Oblast =

Yeskino Ескино
- Village
- Location within Vologda Oblast Location within Russia
- Coordinates: 59°16′N 39°05′E
- Country: Russia
- Region: Vologda Oblast
- District: Vologodsky District
- Time zone: UTC+3:00

Yeskino (Russian: Ескино) is a rural locality (a village) in Staroselskoye Rural Settlement, Vologodsky District, Vologda Oblast, Russia. The population was 3 as of 2002.

== Geography ==
Yeskino is located 69 km northwest of Vologda (the district's administrative centre) by road. Koskovo is the nearest rural locality.
