= Zayakoshye =

Zayakoshye Заякошье
- Village
- Location within Vologda Oblast Location within Russia
- Coordinates: 59°12′N 37°54′E
- Country: Russia
- Region: Vologda Oblast
- District: Cherepovetsky District
- Time zone: UTC+3:00

Zayakoshye (Russian: Заякошье) is a rural locality (a village) in Malechkinskoye Rural Settlement, Cherepovetsky District, Vologda Oblast, Russia. The population was 1452 as of 2021.

== Geography ==
Zayakoshye is located 16 km north of Cherepovets (the district's administrative centre) by road. Dementyevo is the nearest rural locality.
