= Dorki =

Dorki Дорки
- Village
- Location within Vologda Oblast Location within Russia
- Coordinates: 58°57′N 38°36′E
- Country: Russia
- Region: Vologda Oblast
- District: Cherepovetsky District
- Time zone: UTC+3:00

Dorki (Russian: Дорки) is a rural locality (a village) in Yugskoye Rural Settlement, Cherepovetsky District, Vologda Oblast, Russia. The population was 12 as of 2002. There are 4 streets.

== Geography ==
Dorki is located 58 km (36 mi) southeast of Cherepovets (the district's administrative centre) by road. Shalimovo is the nearest rural locality.
