= Dudinskoye =

Dudinskoye Дудинское
- Village
- Location within Vologda Oblast Location within Russia
- Coordinates: 59°14′N 39°44′E
- Country: Russia
- Region: Vologda Oblast
- District: Vologodsky District
- Time zone: UTC+3:00

Dudinskoye (Russian: Дудинское) is a rural locality (a village) in Mayskoye Rural Settlement, Vologodsky District, Vologda Oblast, Russia. The population was 159 as of 2002. There are 6 streets.

== Geography ==
Dudinskoye is located 10 km northwest of Vologda (the district's administrative centre) by road. Staroye is the nearest rural locality.
