= Iskra, Vologda Oblast =

Iskra Искра
- Village
- Location within Vologda Oblast Location within Russia
- Coordinates: 58°45′N 37°42′E
- Country: Russia
- Region: Vologda Oblast
- District: Cherepovetsky District
- Time zone: UTC+3:00

Iskra (Russian: Искра) is a rural locality (a village) in Yagnitskoye Rural Settlement, Cherepovetsky District, Vologda Oblast, Russia. The population was 26 as of 2002.

== Geography ==
Iskra is located 106 km (66 mi) south of Cherepovets (the district's administrative centre) by road. Mikheyevo is the nearest rural locality.
