= Kharachevo =

Kharachevo Харачево
- Settlement
- Location within Vologda Oblast Location within Russia
- Coordinates: 59°09′N 39°58′E
- Country: Russia
- Region: Vologda Oblast
- District: Vologodsky District
- Time zone: UTC+3:00

Kharachevo (Russian: Харачево) is a rural locality (a settlement) in Podlesnoye Rural Settlement, Vologodsky District, Vologda Oblast, Russia. The population was 745 as of 2002. There are 11 streets.

== Geography ==
Kharachevo is located 10 km southeast of Vologda (the district's administrative centre) by road. Babikovo is the nearest rural locality.
