= Maksakovo =

Maksakovo Максаково
- Village
- Location within Vologda Oblast Location within Russia
- Coordinates: 58°56′N 38°08′E
- Country: Russia
- Region: Vologda Oblast
- District: Cherepovetsky District
- Time zone: UTC+3:00

Maksakovo (Russian: Максаково) is a rural locality (a village) in Myaksinskoye Rural Settlement, Cherepovetsky District, Vologda Oblast, Russia. The population was 27 as of 2002.

== Geography ==
Maksakovo is located 29 km (18 mi) southeast of Cherepovets (the district's administrative centre) by road. Kustets is the nearest rural locality.
