= Slobodino =

Slobodino Слободино
- Village
- Location within Vologda Oblast Location within Russia
- Coordinates: 59°21′N 37°54′E
- Country: Russia
- Region: Vologda Oblast
- District: Cherepovetsky District
- Time zone: UTC+3:00

Slobodino (Russian: Слободино) is a rural locality (a village) in Voskresenskoye Rural Settlement, Cherepovetsky District, Vologda Oblast, Russia. The population was 3 as of 2002. There are 3 streets.

== Geography ==
Slobodino is located 34 km north of Cherepovets (the district's administrative centre) by road. Yermolovskaya is the nearest rural locality.
