= Tyushkovo =

Tyushkovo Тюшково
- Village
- Location within Vologda Oblast Location within Russia
- Coordinates: 59°28′N 37°41′E
- Country: Russia
- Region: Vologda Oblast
- District: Cherepovetsky District
- Time zone: UTC+3:00

Tyushkovo (Russian: Тюшково) is a rural locality (a village) in Voskresenskoye Rural Settlement, Cherepovetsky District, Vologda Oblast, Russia. The population was 6 as of 2002.

== Geography ==
Tyushkovo is located 53 km northwest of Cherepovets (the district's administrative centre) by road. Afonino is the nearest rural locality.
