= Tyutnevo =

Tyutnevo Тютнево
- Village
- Location within Vologda Oblast Location within Russia
- Coordinates: 59°22′N 38°08′E
- Country: Russia
- Region: Vologda Oblast
- District: Cherepovetsky District
- Time zone: UTC+3:00

Tyutnevo (Russian: Тютнево) is a rural locality (a village) in Yaganovskoye Rural Settlement, Cherepovetsky District, Vologda Oblast, Russia. The population was 16 as of 2002.

== Geography ==
Tyutnevo is located 37 km northeast of Cherepovets (the district's administrative centre) by road. Lenino is the nearest rural locality.
