= Vichelovo =

Vichelovo Вичелово
- Village
- Location within Vologda Oblast Location within Russia
- Coordinates: 59°00′N 37°57′E
- Country: Russia
- Region: Vologda Oblast
- District: Cherepovetsky District
- Time zone: UTC+3:00

Vichelovo (Russian: Вичелово) is a rural locality (a village) in Yugskoye Rural Settlement, Cherepovetsky District, Vologda Oblast, Russia. The population was 18 as of 2002. There are 9 streets.

== Geography ==
Vichelovo is located 20 km south of Cherepovets (the district's administrative centre) by road. Voronino is the nearest rural locality.
