= Vorotynya =

Vorotynya Воротыня
- Village
- Location within Vologda Oblast Location within Russia
- Coordinates: 59°32′N 37°27′E
- Country: Russia
- Region: Vologda Oblast
- District: Cherepovetsky District
- Time zone: UTC+3:00

Vorotynya (Russian: Воротыня) is a rural locality (a village) in Voskresenskoye Rural Settlement, Cherepovetsky District, Vologda Oblast, Russia. The population was 1 as of 2002.

== Geography ==
Vorotynya is located 70 km northwest of Cherepovets (the district's administrative centre) by road. Pazhetskoye is the nearest rural locality.
