= Yelekhovo =

Yelekhovo Елехово
- Village
- Location within Vologda Oblast Location within Russia
- Coordinates: 59°03′N 37°21′E
- Country: Russia
- Region: Vologda Oblast
- District: Cherepovetsky District
- Time zone: UTC+3:00

Yelekhovo (Russian: Елехово) is a rural locality (a village) in Korotovskoye Rural Settlement, Cherepovetsky District, Vologda Oblast, Russia. The population was 4 as of 2002.

== Geography ==
Yelekhovo is located 52 km southwest of Cherepovets (the district's administrative centre) by road. Akinkhovo is the nearest rural locality.
