= Barachevo =

Barachevo Барачево
- Village
- Location within Vologda Oblast Location within Russia
- Coordinates: 59°26′N 39°35′E
- Country: Russia
- Region: Vologda Oblast
- District: Vologodsky District
- Time zone: UTC+3:00

Barachevo (Russian: Барачево) is a rural locality (a village) in Kubenskoye Rural Settlement, Vologodsky District, Vologda Oblast, Russia. The population was 5 as of 2002.

== Geography ==
The distance to Vologda is 36.5 km, to Kubenskoye is 6.5 km. Khripelovo, Kryukovo, Khvastovo are the nearest rural localities.
