= Bystrino =

Bystrino Быстрино
- Village
- Location within Vologda Oblast Location within Russia
- Coordinates: 58°52′N 38°12′E
- Country: Russia
- Region: Vologda Oblast
- District: Cherepovetsky District
- Time zone: UTC+3:00

Bystrino (Russian: Быстрино) is a rural locality (a village) in Myaksinskoye Rural Settlement, Cherepovetsky District, Vologda Oblast, Russia. The population was 29 as of 2002.

== Geography ==
Bystrino is located 36 km (22 mi) southeast of Cherepovets (the district's administrative centre) by road. Myaksa is the nearest rural locality.
