= Khokhlevo =

Khokhlevo Хохлево
- Village
- Location within Vologda Oblast Location within Russia
- Coordinates: 59°03′N 39°43′E
- Country: Russia
- Region: Vologda Oblast
- District: Vologodsky District
- Time zone: UTC+3:00

Khokhlevo (Russian: Хохлево) is a rural locality (a village) in Spasskoye Rural Settlement, Vologodsky District, Vologda Oblast, Russia. The population was 57 as of 2002. There are two streets.

== Geography ==
Khokhlevo is located 24 km southwest of Vologda (the district's administrative centre) by road. Mstishino is the nearest rural locality.
