= Lukintsevo =

Lukintsevo Лукинцево
- Village
- Location within Vologda Oblast Location within Russia
- Coordinates: 59°05′N 40°08′E
- Country: Russia
- Region: Vologda Oblast
- District: Vologodsky District
- Time zone: UTC+3:00

Lukintsevo (Russian: Лукинцево) is a rural locality (a village) in Markovskoye Rural Settlement, Vologodsky District, Vologda Oblast, Russia. The population was 6 as of 2002.

== Geography ==
Lukintsevo is located 22 km southeast of Vologda (the district's administrative centre) by road. Vasilyevskoye is the nearest rural locality.
