= Roslino =

Roslino Рослино
- Village
- Location within Vologda Oblast Location within Russia
- Coordinates: 59°01′N 38°02′E
- Country: Russia
- Region: Vologda Oblast
- District: Cherepovetsky District
- Time zone: UTC+3:00

Roslino (Russian: Рослино) is a rural locality (a village) in Yugskoye Rural Settlement, Cherepovetsky District, Vologda Oblast, Russia. The population was 18 as of 2002. There are 2 streets.

== Geography ==
Roslino is located 18 km (11 mi) southeast of Cherepovets (the district's administrative centre) by road. Pochinok is the nearest rural locality.
