= Sheyno =

Sheyno Шейно
- Village
- Location within Vologda Oblast Location within Russia
- Coordinates: 59°00′N 37°25′E
- Country: Russia
- Region: Vologda Oblast
- District: Cherepovetsky District
- Time zone: UTC+3:00

Sheyno (Russian: Шейно) is a rural locality (a village) in Korotovskoye Rural Settlement, Cherepovetsky District, Vologda Oblast, Russia. The population was 23 as of 2002. There are 3 streets.

== Geography ==
Sheyno is located 59 km southwest of Cherepovets (the district's administrative centre) by road. Kokorevo is the nearest rural locality.
