= Turmanskoye =

Turmanskoye Турманское
- Village
- Location within Vologda Oblast Location within Russia
- Coordinates: 59°29′N 37°21′E
- Country: Russia
- Region: Vologda Oblast
- District: Cherepovetsky District
- Time zone: UTC+3:00

Turmanskoye (Russian: Турманское) is a rural locality (a village) in Voskresenskoye Rural Settlement, Cherepovetsky District, Vologda Oblast, Russia. The population was 4 as of 2002.

== Geography ==
Turmanskoye is located 77 km northwest of Cherepovets (the district's administrative centre) by road. Berezovik is the nearest rural locality.
