= Yashnevo =

Yashnevo Яшнево
- Village
- Location within Vologda Oblast Location within Russia
- Coordinates: 58°54′N 38°10′E
- Country: Russia
- Region: Vologda Oblast
- District: Cherepovetsky District
- Time zone: UTC+3:00

Yashnevo (Russian: Яшнево) is a rural locality (a village) in Myaksinskoye Rural Settlement, Cherepovetsky District, Vologda Oblast, Russia. The population was 1 as of 2002.

== Geography ==
Yashnevo is located 32 km southeast of Cherepovets (the district's administrative centre) by road. Mikhalevo is the nearest rural locality.
