= Berezovik =

Berezovik Березовик
- Village
- Location within Vologda Oblast Location within Russia
- Coordinates: 59°30′N 37°22′E
- Country: Russia
- Region: Vologda Oblast
- District: Cherepovetsky District
- Time zone: UTC+3:00

Berezovik (Russian: Березовик) is a rural locality (a village) in Voskresenskoye Rural Settlement, Cherepovetsky District, Vologda Oblast, Russia. The population was 21 as of 2002.

== Geography ==
Berezovik is located 74 km (46 mi) northwest of Cherepovets (the district's administrative centre) by road. Vysokoye is the nearest rural locality.
