= Bugrino, Vologda Oblast =

Bugrino Бугрино
- Village
- Location within Vologda Oblast Location within Russia
- Coordinates: 59°29′N 39°25′E
- Country: Russia
- Region: Vologda Oblast
- District: Vologodsky District
- Time zone: UTC+3:00

Bugrino (Russian: Бугрино) is a rural locality (a village) in Kubenskoye Rural Settlement, Vologodsky District, Vologda Oblast, Russia. The population was 50 as of 2002.

== Geography ==
Bugrino is located 49 km northwest of Vologda (the district's administrative centre) by road. Voskresenskoye is the nearest rural locality.
