= Dereventsevo =

Dereventsevo Деревенцево
- Village
- Location within Vologda Oblast Location within Russia
- Coordinates: 59°25′N 39°41′E
- Country: Russia
- Region: Vologda Oblast
- District: Vologodsky District
- Time zone: UTC+3:00

Dereventsevo (Russian: Деревенцево) is a rural locality (a village) in Kubenskoye Rural Settlement, Vologodsky District, Vologda Oblast, Russia. The population was 9 as of 2002.

== Geography ==
Dereventsevo is located 33 km northwest of Vologda (the district's administrative centre) by road. Pogorelovo is the nearest rural locality.
