= Doronino =

Doronino Доронино
- Village
- Location within Vologda Oblast Location within Russia
- Coordinates: 59°03′N 38°06′E
- Country: Russia
- Region: Vologda Oblast
- District: Cherepovetsky District
- Time zone: UTC+3:00

Doronino (Russian: Доронино) is a rural locality (a village) in Yugskoye Rural Settlement, Cherepovetsky District, Vologda Oblast, Russia. The population was 33 as of 2002. There are 4 streets.

== Geography ==
Doronino is located 24 km (15 mi) southeast of Cherepovets (the district's administrative centre) by road. Vangino is the nearest rural locality.
