= Koskovo, Vologodsky District, Vologda Oblast =

Koskovo Косково
- Village
- Location within Vologda Oblast Location within Russia
- Coordinates: 59°06′N 40°08′E
- Country: Russia
- Region: Vologda Oblast
- District: Vologodsky District
- Time zone: UTC+3:00

Koskovo (Russian: Косково) is a rural locality (a village) in Staroselskoye Rural Settlement, Vologodsky District, Vologda Oblast, Russia. The population was 5 as of 2002.

== Geography ==
Koskovo is located 23 km southeast of Vologda (the district's administrative centre) by road. Borborino is the nearest rural locality.
