= Markhinino =

Markhinino Мархинино
- Village
- Location within Vologda Oblast Location within Russia
- Coordinates: 59°20′N 38°03′E
- Country: Russia
- Region: Vologda Oblast
- District: Cherepovetsky District
- Time zone: UTC+3:00

Markhinino (Russian: Мархинино) is a rural locality (a village) in Yargomzhskoye Rural Settlement, Cherepovetsky District, Vologda Oblast, Russia. The population was 17 as of 2002.

== Geography ==
Markhinino is located 31 km (19 mi) north of Cherepovets (the district's administrative centre) by road. Kolkach is the nearest rural locality.
