= Molochnaya, Vologodsky District, Vologda Oblast =

Molochnaya Молочная
- Station
- Location within Vologda Oblast Location within Russia
- Coordinates: 59°15′N 39°39′E
- Country: Russia
- Region: Vologda Oblast
- District: Vologodsky District
- Time zone: UTC+3:00

Molochnaya (Russian: Молочная) is a rural locality (a station) in Mayskoye Rural Settlement, Vologodsky District, Vologda Oblast, Russia. The population was 33 as of 2002.

== Geography ==
The distance to Vologda is 24 km, to Mayskoye is 5 km. Bovykino is the nearest rural locality.
