= Nyankino =

Nyankino Нянькино
- Village
- Location within Vologda Oblast Location within Russia
- Coordinates: 58°49′N 38°26′E
- Country: Russia
- Region: Vologda Oblast
- District: Cherepovetsky District
- Time zone: UTC+3:00

Nyankino (Russian: Нянькино) is a rural locality (a village) in Myaksinskoye Rural Settlement, Cherepovetsky District, Vologda Oblast, Russia. The population was 15 as of 2002.

== Geography ==
Nyankino is located 53 km (33 mi) southeast of Cherepovets (the district's administrative centre) by road. Kodino is the nearest rural locality.
