= Pesye =

Pesye Песье
- Village
- Location within Vologda Oblast Location within Russia
- Coordinates: 59°01′N 37°23′E
- Country: Russia
- Region: Vologda Oblast
- District: Cherepovetsky District
- Time zone: UTC+3:00

Pesye (Russian: Песье) is a rural locality (a village) in Korotovskoye Rural Settlement, Cherepovetsky District, Vologda Oblast, Russia. The population was 125 as of 2002. There are 4 streets.

== Geography ==
Pesye is located 53 km (33 mi) southwest of Cherepovets (the district's administrative centre) by road. Spirovo is the nearest rural locality.
