= Poluyevo =

Poluyevo Полуево
- Village
- Location within Vologda Oblast Location within Russia
- Coordinates: 59°03′N 37°55′E
- Country: Russia
- Region: Vologda Oblast
- District: Cherepovetsky District
- Time zone: UTC+3:00

Poluyevo (Russian: Полуево) is a rural locality (a village) in Yugskoye Rural Settlement, Cherepovetsky District, Vologda Oblast, Russia. The population was 2 as of 2002.

== Geography ==
Poluyevo is located 10 km (6.2 mi) south of Cherepovets (the district's administrative centre) by road. Novosela is the nearest rural locality.
