= Potrokhovo =

Potrokhovo Потрохово
- Village
- Location within Vologda Oblast Location within Russia
- Coordinates: 59°28′N 39°12′E
- Country: Russia
- Region: Vologda Oblast
- District: Vologodsky District
- Time zone: UTC+3:00

Potrokhovo (Russian: Потрохово) is a rural locality (a village) in Kubenskoye Rural Settlement, Vologodsky District, Vologda Oblast, Russia. The population was 9 as of 2002.

== Geography ==
Potrokhovo is located 61 km northwest of Vologda (the district's administrative centre) by road. Vysokovo-1 is the nearest rural locality.
