= Tupochelovo =

Tupochelovo Тупочелово
- Village
- Location within Vologda Oblast Location within Russia
- Coordinates: 59°35′N 39°20′E
- Country: Russia
- Region: Vologda Oblast
- District: Vologodsky District
- Time zone: UTC+3:00

Tupochelovo (Russian: Тупочелово) is a rural locality (a village) in Novlenskoye Rural Settlement, Vologodsky District, Vologda Oblast, Russia. The population was 4 as of 2002.

== Geography ==
Tupochelovo is located 58 km northwest of Vologda (the district's administrative centre) by road. Vedrakovo is the nearest rural locality.
