= Varlamovo =

Varlamovo Варламово
- Village
- Location within Vologda Oblast Location within Russia
- Coordinates: 59°15′N 39°47′E
- Country: Russia
- Region: Vologda Oblast
- District: Vologodsky District
- Time zone: UTC+3:00

Varlamovo (Russian: Варламово) is a rural locality (a village) in Mayskoye Rural Settlement, Vologodsky District, Vologda Oblast, Russia. The population was 10 as of 2002. There are 3 streets.

== Geography ==
Varlamovo is located 12 km northwest of Vologda (the district's administrative centre) by road. Dmitriyevo is the nearest rural locality.
