= Volkovo, Spasskoye Rural Settlement, Vologodsky District, Vologda Oblast =

Volkovo Волково
- Village
- Location within Vologda Oblast Location within Russia
- Coordinates: 59°10′15″N 39°58′13″E
- Country: Russia
- Region: Vologda Oblast
- District: Vologodsky District
- Time zone: UTC+3:00

Volkovo (Russian: Волково) is a rural locality (a village) in Spasskoye Rural Settlement, Vologodsky District, Vologda Oblast, Russia. The population was 11 as of 2002.

== Geography ==
The distance to Vologda is 29 km, to Nepotyagovo is 19 km.
