= Yenyukovo =

Yenyukovo Енюково
- Village
- Location within Vologda Oblast Location within Russia
- Coordinates: 59°18′N 37°59′E
- Country: Russia
- Region: Vologda Oblast
- District: Cherepovetsky District
- Time zone: UTC+3:00

Yenyukovo (Russian: Енюково) is a rural locality (a village) in Yargomzhskoye Rural Settlement, Cherepovetsky District, Vologda Oblast, Russia. The population was 138 as of 2002.

== Geography ==
Yenyukovo is located 26 km north of Cherepovets (the district's administrative centre) by road. Ramenye is the nearest rural locality.
