= Zalomaikha =

Zalomaikha Заломаиха
- Village
- Location within Vologda Oblast Location within Russia
- Coordinates: 59°21′N 39°19′E
- Country: Russia
- Region: Vologda Oblast
- District: Vologodsky District
- Time zone: UTC+3:00

Zalomaikha (Russian: Заломаиха) is a rural locality (a village) in Kubenskoye Rural Settlement, Vologodsky District, Vologda Oblast, Russia. The population was 12 as of 2002.

== Geography ==
Zalomaikha is located 56 km northwest of Vologda (the district's administrative centre) by road. Kosyakovo is the nearest rural locality.
