= Fofantsevo =

Fofantsevo Фофанцево
- Village
- Location within Vologda Oblast Location within Russia
- Coordinates: 59°19′N 39°59′E
- Country: Russia
- Region: Vologda Oblast
- District: Vologodsky District
- Time zone: UTC+3:00

Fofantsevo (Russian: Фофанцево) is a rural locality (a village) in Prilukskoye Rural Settlement, Vologodsky District, Vologda Oblast, Russia. The population was 793 as of 2002.

== Geography ==
Fofantsevo is located 15 km northeast of Vologda (the district's administrative centre) by road. Muravyovo is the nearest rural locality.
