= Kocheurovo =

Kocheurovo Кочеурово
- Village
- Location within Vologda Oblast Location within Russia
- Coordinates: 59°28′N 39°29′E
- Country: Russia
- Region: Vologda Oblast
- District: Vologodsky District
- Time zone: UTC+3:00

Kocheurovo (Russian: Кочеурово) is a rural locality, a village in Kubenskoye Rural Settlement, Vologodsky District, Vologda Oblast, Russia. The population was only 7 as of 2002.

== Geography ==
Kocheurovo is located 48km northwest of Vologda (the district's administrative centre) by road. Sukholomovo is the nearest rural locality.
