= Maximishchevo =

Maximishchevo Максимищево
- Village
- Location within Vologda Oblast Location within Russia
- Coordinates: 59°34′N 39°10′E
- Country: Russia
- Region: Vologda Oblast
- District: Vologodsky District
- Time zone: UTC+3:00

Maximishchevo (Russian: Максимищево) is a rural locality (a village) in the Novlenskoye Rural Settlement, Vologodsky District within the Vologda Oblast, Russia. As of 2002, the population was 1.

== Geography ==
Maximishchevo is located 73 km northwest of Vologda, the administrative center of the district, by road. Khalezevo is the nearest rural locality.
