= Ostashevo, Vologda Oblast =

Ostashevo Осташево
- Village
- Location within Vologda Oblast Location within Russia
- Coordinates: 59°30′N 38°55′E
- Country: Russia
- Region: Vologda Oblast
- District: Vologodsky District
- Time zone: UTC+3:00

Ostashevo (Russian: Осташево) is a rural locality (a village) in Novlenskoye Rural Settlement, Vologodsky District, Vologda Oblast, Russia. The population was 5 as of 2002.

== Geography ==
Ostashevo is located 87 km northwest of Vologda (the district's administrative centre) by road. Beglovo is the nearest rural locality.
