= Pavshino, Novlenskoye Rural Settlement, Vologodsky District, Vologda Oblast =

Pavshino Павшино
- Village
- Location within Vologda Oblast Location within Russia
- Coordinates: 59°34′N 39°25′E
- Country: Russia
- Region: Vologda Oblast
- District: Vologodsky District
- Time zone: UTC+3:00

Pavshino (Russian: Павшино) is a rural locality (a village) in Novlenskoye Rural Settlement, Vologodsky District, Vologda Oblast, Russia. The population was 8 as of 2002.

== Geography ==
The distance to Vologda is 67 km, to Novlenskoye is 7 km.
