= Prokunino, Leskovskoye Rural Settlement, Vologodsky District, Vologda Oblast =

Prokunino Прокунино
- Village
- Location within Vologda Oblast Location within Russia
- Coordinates: 59°12′N 39°42′E
- Country: Russia
- Region: Vologda Oblast
- District: Vologodsky District
- Time zone: UTC+3:00

Prokunino (Russian: Прокунино) is a rural locality (a village) in Leskovskoye Rural Settlement, Vologodsky District, Vologda Oblast, Russia. The population was 2 as of 2002.

== Geography ==
The distance to Vologda is 20 km, to Leskovo is 5 km.
