= Sporyshevo =

Sporyshevo Спорышево
- Village
- Location within Vologda Oblast Location within Russia
- Coordinates: 59°15′N 39°33′E
- Country: Russia
- Region: Vologda Oblast
- District: Vologodsky District
- Time zone: UTC+3:00

Sporyshevo (Russian: Спорышево) is a rural locality (a village) in Mayskoye Rural Settlement, Vologodsky District, Vologda Oblast, Russia. The population was 2 as of 2002.

== Geography ==
Sporyshevo is located 14km northwest of Vologda (the district's administrative centre) by road. Kovyliovo is the nearest village. creek Mesha
