= Trushnevo =

Trushnevo Трушнево
- Village
- Location within Vologda Oblast Location within Russia
- Coordinates: 59°15′N 37°41′E
- Country: Russia
- Region: Vologda Oblast
- District: Cherepovetsky District
- Time zone: UTC+3:00

Trushnevo (Russian: Трушнево) is a rural locality (a village) in Abakanovskoye Rural Settlement, Cherepovetsky District, Vologda Oblast, Russia. The population was 11 in 2002.

== Geography ==
Trushnevo is located 33 km northwest of Cherepovets (the district's administrative centre) by road. Pogorelka is the nearest rural locality.
