= Usishchevo =

Usishchevo Усищево
- Village
- Location within Vologda Oblast Location within Russia
- Coordinates: 58°57′N 38°12′E
- Country: Russia
- Region: Vologda Oblast
- District: Cherepovetsky District
- Time zone: UTC+3:00

Usishchevo (Russian: Усищево) is a rural locality (a village) in Myaksinskoye Rural Settlement, Cherepovetsky District, Vologda Oblast, Russia. The population was 32 as of 2002.

== Geography ==
Usishchevo is located 31 km southeast of Cherepovets (the district's administrative centre) by road. Kostyayevo is the nearest rural locality.
