= Viterzhevo =

Viterzhevo Витержево
- Village
- Location within Vologda Oblast Location within Russia
- Coordinates: 59°00′N 38°17′E
- Country: Russia
- Region: Vologda Oblast
- District: Cherepovetsky District
- Time zone: UTC+3:00

Viterzhevo (Russian: Витержево) is a rural locality (a village) in Yugskoye Rural Settlement, Cherepovetsky District, Vologda Oblast, Russia. The population was 20 as of 2002.

== Geography ==
Viterzhevo is located 35 km southeast of Cherepovets (the district's administrative centre) by road. Chernevo is the nearest rural locality.
