= Dorkovo, Vologda Oblast =

Dorkovo Дорково
- Village
- Location within Vologda Oblast Location within Russia
- Coordinates: 59°11′N 39°40′E
- Country: Russia
- Region: Vologda Oblast
- District: Vologodsky District
- Time zone: UTC+3:00

Dorkovo (Russian: Дорково) is a rural locality (a village) in Leskovskoye Rural Settlement, Vologodsky District, Vologda Oblast, Russia. The population was 2 as of 2002.

== Geography ==
Dorkovo is located 17 km southwest of Vologda (the district's administrative centre) by road. Spirino is the nearest rural locality.
