= Grenevo =

Grenevo Гренево
- Village
- Location within Vologda Oblast Location within Russia
- Coordinates: 59°22′N 38°03′E
- Country: Russia
- Region: Vologda Oblast
- District: Cherepovetsky District
- Time zone: UTC+3:00

Grenevo (Russian: Гренево) is a rural locality (a village) in Klimovksoye Rural Settlement, Cherepovetsky District, Vologda Oblast, Russia. The population was 6 as of 2002.

== Geography ==
Grenevo is located 35 km (22 mi) northeast of Cherepovets (the district's administrative centre) by road. Perkhino is the nearest rural locality.
