= Khrebtovo =

Khrebtovo Хребтово
- Village
- Location within Vologda Oblast Location within Russia
- Coordinates: 59°32′N 39°10′E
- Country: Russia
- Region: Vologda Oblast
- District: Vologodsky District
- Time zone: UTC+3:00

Khrebtovo (Russian: Хребтово) is a rural locality (a village) in Novlenskoye Rural Settlement, Vologodsky District, Vologda Oblast, Russia. The population was 11 as of 2002.

== Geography ==
Khrebtovo is located 74 km northwest of Vologda (the district's administrative centre) by road. Konstantinovo is the nearest rural locality.
