= Kulemesovo =

Kulemesovo Кулемесово
- Village
- Location within Vologda Oblast Location within Russia
- Coordinates: 59°23′N 39°44′E
- Country: Russia
- Region: Vologda Oblast
- District: Vologodsky District
- Time zone: UTC+3:00

Kulemesovo (Russian: Кулемесово) is a rural locality (a village) in Kubenskoye Rural Settlement, Vologodsky District, Vologda Oblast, Russia. The population was 13 as of 2002.

== Geography ==
Kulemesovo is located 23 km northwest of Vologda (the district's administrative centre) by road. Baralovo is the nearest rural locality.
