= Otekleyevo =

Otekleyevo Отеклеево
- Village
- Location within Vologda Oblast Location within Russia
- Coordinates: 59°45′N 39°05′E
- Country: Russia
- Region: Vologda Oblast
- District: Vologodsky District
- Time zone: UTC+3:00

Otekleyevo (Russian: Отеклеево) is a rural locality (a village) in Novlenskoye Rural Settlement, Vologodsky District, Vologda Oblast, Russia. The population was 4 as of 2002.

== Geography ==
Otekleyevo is located 80 km northwest of Vologda (the district's administrative centre) by road. Kurkino is the nearest rural locality.
