= Semryukhovo =

Semryukhovo Семрюхово
- Village
- Location within Vologda Oblast Location within Russia
- Coordinates: 59°34′N 39°23′E
- Country: Russia
- Region: Vologda Oblast
- District: Vologodsky District
- Time zone: UTC+3:00

Semryukhovo (Russian: Семрюхово) is a rural locality (a village) in Novlenskoye Rural Settlement, Vologodsky District, Vologda Oblast, Russia. The population was 5 as of 2002.

== Geography ==
Semryukhovo is located 53 km northwest of Vologda (the district's administrative centre) by road. Chernevo is the nearest rural locality.
