= Sukholzhino =

Sukholzhino Сухолжино
- Village
- Location within Vologda Oblast Location within Russia
- Coordinates: 59°38′N 39°10′E
- Country: Russia
- Region: Vologda Oblast
- District: Vologodsky District
- Time zone: UTC+3:00

Sukholzhino (Russian: Сухолжино) is a rural locality (a village) in Novlenskoye Rural Settlement, Vologodsky District, Vologda Oblast, Russia. The population was 9 as of 2002.

== Geography ==
Sukholzhino is located 75 km northwest of Vologda (the district's administrative centre) by road. Indalovo is the nearest rural locality.
