= Vangino =

Vangino Ваньгино
- Village
- Location within Vologda Oblast Location within Russia
- Coordinates: 59°04′N 38°06′E
- Country: Russia
- Region: Vologda Oblast
- District: Cherepovetsky District
- Time zone: UTC+3:00

Vangino (Russian: Ваньгино) is a rural locality (a village) in Yugskoye Rural Settlement, Cherepovetsky District, Vologda Oblast, Russia. The population was 1 as of 2002. There are 3 streets.

== Geography ==
Vangino is located 25 km southeast of Cherepovets (the district's administrative centre) by road. Doronino is the nearest rural locality.
