= Fenevo =

Fenevo Фенево
- Village
- Location within Vologda Oblast Location within Russia
- Coordinates: 59°15′N 37°56′E
- Country: Russia
- Region: Vologda Oblast
- District: Cherepovetsky District
- Time zone: UTC+3:00

Fenevo (Russian: Фенево) is a rural locality (a village) in Yargomzhskoye Rural Settlement, Cherepovetsky District, Vologda Oblast, Russia. The population was 41 as of 2002.

== Geography ==
Fenevo is located 18 km (11 mi) north of Cherepovets (the district's administrative centre) by road. Botovo is the nearest rural locality.
