= Filyutino =

Filyutino Филютино
- Village
- Location within Vologda Oblast Location within Russia
- Coordinates: 59°38′N 39°14′E
- Country: Russia
- Region: Vologda Oblast
- District: Vologodsky District
- Time zone: UTC+3:00

Filyutino (Russian: Филютино) is a rural locality (a village) in Novlenskoye Rural Settlement, Vologodsky District, Vologda Oblast, Russia. The population was 112 as of 2002. There are 2 streets.

== Geography ==
Filyutino is located 64 km northwest of Vologda (the district's administrative centre) by road. Yeremeyevo is the nearest rural locality.
