= Fryazinovo =

Fryazinovo Фрязиново
- Village
- Location within Vologda Oblast Location within Russia
- Coordinates: 59°43′N 39°06′E
- Country: Russia
- Region: Vologda Oblast
- District: Vologodsky District
- Time zone: UTC+3:00

Fryazinovo (Russian: Фрязиново) is a rural locality (a village) in Novlenskoye Rural Settlement, Vologodsky District, Vologda Oblast, Russia. Its population was 4 as of 2002.

== Geography ==
Fryazinovo is located 76 km northwest of Vologda (the district's administrative centre). Nagornovo is the nearest rural locality.
