= Lobkovo, Vologda Oblast =

Lobkovo Лобково
- Village
- Location within Vologda Oblast Location within Russia
- Coordinates: 59°09′N 40°17′E
- Country: Russia
- Region: Vologda Oblast
- District: Vologodsky District
- Time zone: UTC+3:00

Lobkovo (Russian: Лобково) is a rural locality (a village) in Markovskoye Rural Settlement, Vologodsky District, Vologda Oblast, Russia. The population was 22 as of 2002.

== Geography ==
Lobkovo is located 31 km southeast of Vologda (the district's administrative centre) by road. Nizma is the nearest rural locality.
