= Ozerkovo =

Ozerkovo Озерково
- Village
- Location within Vologda Oblast Location within Russia
- Coordinates: 59°21′N 39°28′E
- Country: Russia
- Region: Vologda Oblast
- District: Vologodsky District
- Time zone: UTC+3:00

Ozerkovo (Russian: Озерково) is a rural locality (a village) in Kubenskoye Rural Settlement, Vologodsky District, Vologda Oblast, Russia. The population was 6 as of 2002.

== Geography ==
The distance to Vologda is 43 km (27 mi), to Kubenskoye is 14 km (8.7 mi). GES is the nearest rural locality.
