= Peryevo =

Peryevo Перьево
- Village
- Location within Vologda Oblast Location within Russia
- Coordinates: 59°27′N 39°29′E
- Country: Russia
- Region: Vologda Oblast
- District: Vologodsky District
- Time zone: UTC+3:00

Peryevo (Russian: Перьево) is a rural locality (a village) in Kubenskoye Rural Settlement, Vologodsky District, Vologda Oblast, Russia. The population was 2 as of 2002.

== Geography ==
Peryevo is located 49 km northwest of Vologda, the administrative center of the district, when measured by road. The nearest rural locality to Peryevo is Kocheurovo.
