= Podomartsevo =

Podomartsevo Подомарцево
- Village
- Location within Vologda Oblast Location within Russia
- Coordinates: 59°01′N 39°46′E
- Country: Russia
- Region: Vologda Oblast
- District: Vologodsky District
- Time zone: UTC+3:00

Podomartsevo (Russian: Подомарцево) is a rural locality (a village) in Spasskoye Rural Settlement, Vologodsky District, Vologda Oblast, Russia. The population was 1 as of 2002.

== Geography ==
Podomartsevo is located 25 km southwest of Vologda (the district's administrative centre) by road. Podgorye is the nearest rural locality.
