= Sukovatka =

Sukovatka Суковатка
- Village
- Location within Vologda Oblast Location within Russia
- Coordinates: 58°47′N 38°52′E
- Country: Russia
- Region: Vologda Oblast
- District: Cherepovetsky District
- Time zone: UTC+3:00

Sukovatka (Russian: Суковатка) is a rural locality (a village) in Yugskoye Rural Settlement, Cherepovetsky District, Vologda Oblast, Russia. The population was 1 as of 2002.

== Geography ==
Sukovatka is located 83 km southeast of Cherepovets (the district's administrative centre) by road. Shishovka is the nearest rural locality.
