= Uloma, Vologda Oblast =

Uloma Улома
- Selo
- Location within Vologda Oblast Location within Russia
- Coordinates: 58°59′N 37°26′E
- Country: Russia
- Region: Vologda Oblast
- District: Cherepovetsky District
- Time zone: UTC+3:00

Uloma (Russian: Улома) is a rural locality (a selo) in Korotovskoye Rural Settlement, Cherepovetsky District, Vologda Oblast, Russia. The population was 8 as of 2002.

== Geography ==
Uloma is located 60 km southwest of Cherepovets (the district's administrative centre) by road. Zarechye is the nearest rural locality.
