= Yaminovo =

Yaminovo Яминово
- Village
- Location within Vologda Oblast Location within Russia
- Coordinates: 59°10′N 39°43′E
- Country: Russia
- Region: Vologda Oblast
- District: Vologodsky District
- Time zone: UTC+3:00

Yaminovo (Russian: Яминово) is a rural locality (a village) in Spasskoye Rural Settlement, Vologodsky District, Vologda Oblast, Russia. The population was 4 as of 2002. There are 3 streets.

== Geography ==
Yaminovo is located 17 km southwest of Vologda (the district's administrative centre) by road. Shelygino is the nearest rural locality.
