= Zrelovo =

Zrelovo Зрелово
- Village
- Location within Vologda Oblast Location within Russia
- Coordinates: 59°32′59″N 39°05′20″E
- Country: Russia
- Region: Vologda Oblast
- District: Vologodsky District
- Time zone: UTC+3:00

Zrelovo (Russian: Зрелово) is a rural locality (a village) in Novlenskoye Rural Settlement, Vologodsky District, Vologda Oblast, Russia. The population was 8 as of 2002.

== Geography ==
Zrelovo is located 77 km northwest of Vologda (the district's administrative centre) by road. Ignachevo is the nearest rural locality.
