= Bubyrevo =

Bubyrevo Бубырево
- Village
- Location within Vologda Oblast Location within Russia
- Coordinates: 59°40′N 39°12′E
- Country: Russia
- Region: Vologda Oblast
- District: Vologodsky District
- Time zone: UTC+3:00

Bubyrevo (Russian: Бубырево) is a rural locality (a village) in Novlenskoye Rural Settlement, Vologodsky District, Vologda Oblast, Russia. The population was 3 as of 2002.

== Geography ==
Bubyrevo is located 71 km northwest of Vologda (the district's administrative centre) by road. Isakovo is the nearest rural locality.
