= Ignachevo =

Ignachevo Игначево
- Village
- Location within Vologda Oblast Location within Russia
- Coordinates: 59°32′N 39°06′E
- Country: Russia
- Region: Vologda Oblast
- District: Vologodsky District
- Time zone: UTC+3:00

Ignachevo (Russian: Игначево) is a rural locality (a village) in Novlenskoye Rural Settlement, Vologodsky District, Vologda Oblast, Russia. The population was 44 as of 2002.

== Geography ==
Ignachevo is located 75 km (47 mi) northwest of Vologda (the district's administrative centre) by road. Kostromino is the nearest rural locality.
