= Katalovskoye =

Katalovskoye Каталовское
- Village
- Location within Vologda Oblast Location within Russia
- Coordinates: 59°43′N 39°02′E
- Country: Russia
- Region: Vologda Oblast
- District: Vologodsky District
- Time zone: UTC+3:00

Katalovskoye (Russian: Каталовское) is a rural locality (a village) in Novlenskoye Rural Settlement, Vologodsky District, Vologda Oblast, Russia. The population was 12 as of 2002.

== Geography ==
Katalovskoye is located 84 km northwest of Vologda (the district's administrative centre) by road. Linkovo is the nearest rural locality.
