= Kovylevo =

Kovylevo Ковылево
- Village
- Location within Vologda Oblast Location within Russia
- Coordinates: 59°18′N 39°33′E
- Country: Russia
- Region: Vologda Oblast
- District: Vologodsky District
- Time zone: UTC+3:00

Kovylevo (Russian: Ковылево) is a rural locality (a village) in Mayskoye Rural Settlement, Vologodsky District, Vologda Oblast, Russia. The population was 6 as of 2002.

== Geography ==
Kovylevo is located 24 km northwest of Vologda (the district's administrative centre) by road. Pailovo is the nearest rural locality. mesha creek
