= Lyzlovo =

Lyzlovo Лызлово
- Village
- Location within Vologda Oblast Location within Russia
- Coordinates: 59°22′N 39°23′E
- Country: Russia
- Region: Vologda Oblast
- District: Vologodsky District
- Time zone: UTC+3:00

Lyzlovo (Russian: Лызлово) is a rural locality (a village) in Kubenskoye Rural Settlement, Vologodsky District, Vologda Oblast, Russia. The population was 1 as of 2002.

== Geography ==
Lyzlovo is located 47 km northwest of Vologda (the district's administrative centre) by road. Polyanki is the nearest rural locality.
