= Malata, Vologda Oblast =

Malata Малата
- Village
- Location within Vologda Oblast Location within Russia
- Coordinates: 59°03′N 37°59′E
- Country: Russia
- Region: Vologda Oblast
- District: Cherepovetsky District
- Time zone: UTC+3:00

Malata (Russian: Малата) is a rural locality (a village) in Yugskoye Rural Settlement, Cherepovetsky District, Vologda Oblast, Russia. The population was 1 as of 2002.

== Geography ==
Malata is located 15 km (9.3 mi) south of Cherepovets (the district's administrative centre) by road. Blinovo is the nearest rural locality.
