= Mynchakovo =

Mynchakovo Мынчаково
- Village
- Location within Vologda Oblast Location within Russia
- Coordinates: 59°27′N 39°09′E
- Country: Russia
- Region: Vologda Oblast
- District: Vologodsky District
- Time zone: UTC+3:00

Mynchakovo (Russian: Мынчаково) is a rural locality (a village) in Kubenskoye Rural Settlement, Vologodsky District, Vologda Oblast, Russia. The population was 366 as of 2002.

== Geography ==
Mynchakovo is located 65 km northwest of Vologda (the district's administrative centre) by road. Golovkovo is the nearest village.
