= Novgorodovo =

Novgorodovo Новгородово
- Village
- Location within Vologda Oblast Location within Russia
- Coordinates: 59°05′N 39°14′E
- Country: Russia
- Region: Vologda Oblast
- District: Vologodsky District
- Time zone: UTC+3:00

Novgorodovo (Russian: Новгородово) is a rural locality (a village) in Staroselskoye Rural Settlement, Vologodsky District, Vologda Oblast, Russia. The population was 35 as of 2002.

== Geography ==
Novgorodovo is located 46 km southwest of Vologda (the district's administrative centre) by road. Ivakino is the nearest rural locality.
