= Pochinok-2 =

Pochinok-2 Починок-2
- Village
- Location within Vologda Oblast Location within Russia
- Coordinates: 59°10′N 39°31′E
- Country: Russia
- Region: Vologda Oblast
- District: Vologodsky District
- Time zone: UTC+3:00

Pochinok-2 (Russian: Починок-2) is a rural locality (a village) in Sosnovskoye Rural Settlement, Vologodsky District, Vologda Oblast, Russia. The population was 2 as of 2002.

== Geography ==
The distance to Vologda is 31.5 km, to Sosnovka is 12 km. Pirogovo is the nearest rural locality.
