= Rogozkino =

Rogozkino Рогозкино
- Village
- Location within Vologda Oblast Location within Russia
- Coordinates: 59°11′N 39°44′E
- Country: Russia
- Region: Vologda Oblast
- District: Vologodsky District
- Time zone: UTC+3:00

Rogozkino (Russian: Рогозкино) is a rural locality (a village) in Leskovskoye Rural Settlement, Vologodsky District, Vologda Oblast, Russia. The population was 1 as of 2002.

== Geography ==
Rogozkino is located 16 km southwest of Vologda (the district's administrative centre) by road. Zakryshkino is the nearest rural locality.
