= Suzorovo =

Suzorovo Сузорово
- Village
- Location within Vologda Oblast Location within Russia
- Coordinates: 59°25′N 37°52′E
- Country: Russia
- Region: Vologda Oblast
- District: Cherepovetsky District
- Time zone: UTC+3:00

Suzorovo (Russian: Сузорово) is a rural locality (a village) in Voskresenskoye Rural Settlement, Cherepovetsky District, Vologda Oblast, Russia. The population was 3 as of 2002.

== Geography ==
Suzorovo is located 39 km north of Cherepovets (the district's administrative centre) by road. Petrino is the nearest rural locality.
