= Batransky =

Batransky Батранский
- Settlement
- Location within Vologda Oblast Location within Russia
- Coordinates: 58°57′N 38°24′E
- Country: Russia
- Region: Vologda Oblast
- District: Cherepovetsky District
- Time zone: UTC+3:00

Batransky (Russian: Батранский) is a rural locality (a settlement) in Yugskoye Rural Settlement, Cherepovetsky District, Vologda Oblast, Russia. The population was 105 as of 2010.

== Geography ==
Batransky is located 43 km (27 mi) southeast of Cherepovets (the district's administrative centre) by road. Batran is the nearest rural locality.
