= Borodkino, Vologda Oblast =

Borodkino Бородкино
- Village
- Location within Vologda Oblast Location within Russia
- Coordinates: 59°13′N 38°58′E
- Country: Russia
- Region: Vologda Oblast
- District: Vologodsky District
- Time zone: UTC+3:00

Borodkino (Russian: Бородкино) is a rural locality (a village) in Staroselskoye Rural Settlement, Vologodsky District, Vologda Oblast, Russia. The population was 13 as of 2002.

== Geography ==
Borodkino is located 63 km west of Vologda (the district's administrative centre) by road. Chebsara is the nearest rural locality.
