= Botilo =

Botilo Ботило
- Village
- Location within Vologda Oblast Location within Russia
- Coordinates: 59°13′N 37°43′E
- Country: Russia
- Region: Vologda Oblast
- District: Cherepovetsky District
- Time zone: UTC+3:00

Botilo (Russian: Ботило) is a rural locality (a village) in Abakanovskoye Rural Settlement, Cherepovetsky District, Vologda Oblast, Russia. The population was 13 as of 2002.

== Geography ==
Botilo is located 30 km (19 mi) northwest of Cherepovets (the district's administrative centre) by road. Korablevo is the nearest rural locality.
