= Chakhlovo =

Chakhlovo Чахлово
- Station
- Location within Vologda Oblast Location within Russia
- Coordinates: 59°08′N 40°05′E
- Country: Russia
- Region: Vologda Oblast
- District: Vologodsky District
- Time zone: UTC+3:00

Chakhlovo (Russian: Чахлово) is a rural locality (a station) in Podlesnoye Rural Settlement, Vologodsky District, Vologda Oblast, Russia. The population was 8 as of 2002.

== Geography ==
Chakhlovo is located 32 km southeast of Vologda (the district's administrative centre) by road. Katunino is the nearest rural locality.
