= Chechino =

Chechino Чечино
- Village
- Location within Vologda Oblast Location within Russia
- Coordinates: 58°47′N 38°25′E
- Country: Russia
- Region: Vologda Oblast
- District: Cherepovetsky District
- Time zone: UTC+3:00

Chechino (Russian: Чечино) is a rural locality (a village) in Myaksinskoye Rural Settlement, Cherepovetsky District, Vologda Oblast, Russia. The population was 4 as of 2002.

== Geography ==
Chechino is located 56 km (35 mi) southeast of Cherepovets (the district's administrative centre) by road. Pushkino is the nearest rural locality.
