= Kargachevo =

Kargachevo Каргачево
- Village
- Location within Vologda Oblast Location within Russia
- Coordinates: 59°38′N 39°18′E
- Country: Russia
- Region: Vologda Oblast
- District: Vologodsky District
- Time zone: UTC+3:00

Kargachevo (Russian: Каргачево) is a rural locality (a village) in Novlenskoye Rural Settlement, Vologodsky District, Vologda Oblast, Russia. The population was 2 as of 2002.

== Geography ==
Kargachevo is located 62 km northwest of Vologda (the district's administrative centre) by road. Nesterovskoye is the nearest rural locality.
