= Lavkino =

Lavkino Лавкино
- Village
- Location within Vologda Oblast Location within Russia
- Coordinates: 59°12′N 39°33′E
- Country: Russia
- Region: Vologda Oblast
- District: Vologodsky District
- Time zone: UTC+3:00

Lavkino (Russian: Лавкино) is a rural locality (a village) in Sosnovskoye Rural Settlement, Vologodsky District, Vologda Oblast, Russia. The population was 7 as of 2002. There is 1 street.

== Geography ==
Lavkino is located 22 km west of Vologda (the district's administrative centre) by road. Sosnovka is the nearest rural locality.
