= Makutino =

Makutino Макутино
- Village
- Location within Vologda Oblast Location within Russia
- Coordinates: 59°25′N 37°25′E
- Country: Russia
- Region: Vologda Oblast
- District: Cherepovetsky District
- Time zone: UTC+3:00

Makutino (Russian: Макутино) is a rural locality (a village) in Abakanovskoye Rural Settlement, Cherepovetsky District, Vologda Oblast, Russia. The population was 3 as of 2002.

== Geography ==
Makutino is located 57 km (35 mi) northwest of Cherepovets (the district's administrative centre) by road. Sredneye is the nearest rural locality.
