= Mardasovo =

Mardasovo Мардасово
- Village
- Location within Vologda Oblast Location within Russia
- Coordinates: 59°33′N 39°09′E
- Country: Russia
- Region: Vologda Oblast
- District: Vologodsky District
- Time zone: UTC+3:00

Mardasovo (Russian: Мардасово) is a rural locality (a village) in Novlenskoye Rural Settlement, Vologodsky District, Vologda Oblast, Russia. The population was 24 as of 2002.

== Geography ==
Mardasovo is located 72 km northwest of Vologda (the district's administrative centre) by road. Sevastyanovo is the nearest rural locality.
