= Moseykovo =

Moseykovo Мосейково
- Selo
- Location within Vologda Oblast Location within Russia
- Coordinates: 59°08′N 40°00′E
- Country: Russia
- Region: Vologda Oblast
- District: Vologodsky District
- Time zone: UTC+3:00

Moseykovo (Russian: Мосейково) is a rural locality (a selo) in Podlesnoye Rural Settlement, Vologodsky District, Vologda Oblast, Russia. The population was 584 as of 2002.

== Geography ==
Moseykovo is located 13 km southeast from Vologda (the district's administrative centre) by road. Snasudovo is the nearest rural locality.
