= Privalino =

Privalino Привалино
- Village
- Location within Vologda Oblast Location within Russia
- Coordinates: 59°26′N 37°30′E
- Country: Russia
- Region: Vologda Oblast
- District: Cherepovetsky District
- Time zone: UTC+3:00

Privalino (Russian: Привалино) is a rural locality (a village) in Voskresenskoye Rural Settlement, Cherepovetsky District, Vologda Oblast, Russia. The population was 5 as of 2002.

== Geography ==
Privalino is located 72 km (45 mi) northwest of Cherepovets (the district's administrative centre) by road. Aleksino is the nearest rural locality.
