= Shcherbinino =

Shcherbinino Щербинино
- Village
- Location within Vologda Oblast Location within Russia
- Coordinates: 59°11′N 39°09′E
- Country: Russia
- Region: Vologda Oblast
- District: Vologodsky District
- Time zone: UTC+3:00

Shcherbinino (Russian: Щербинино) is a rural locality (a village) in Staroselskoye Rural Settlement, Vologodsky District, Vologda Oblast, Russia. The population was 5 as of 2002.

== Geography ==
Shcherbinino is located 51 km west of Vologda (the district's administrative centre) by road. Fedotovo is the nearest rural locality.
