= Shirogorye =

Shirogorye Широгорье
- Village
- Location within Vologda Oblast Location within Russia
- Coordinates: 59°10′41″N 39°26′11″E
- Country: Russia
- Region: Vologda Oblast
- District: Vologodsky District
- Time zone: UTC+3:00

Shirogorye (Russian: Широгорье) is a rural locality (a village) in Staroselskoye Rural Settlement, Vologodsky District, Vologda Oblast, Russia. The population was 3 as of 2018.

== Geography ==
Shirogorye is located 28 km west of Vologda (the district's administrative centre) by road. Zhukovo is the nearest rural locality.
