= Shishovka =

Shishovka Шишовка
- Village
- Location within Vologda Oblast Location within Russia
- Coordinates: 58°51′N 38°52′E
- Country: Russia
- Region: Vologda Oblast
- District: Cherepovetsky District
- Time zone: UTC+3:00

Shishovka (Russian: Шишовка) is a rural locality (a village) in Yugskoye Rural Settlement, Cherepovetsky District, Vologda Oblast, Russia. The population was 121 as of 2002.

== Geography ==
Shishovka is located 76 km southeast of Cherepovets (the district's administrative centre) by road. Chikeyevo is the nearest rural locality.
