= Skresenskoye =

Skresenskoye Скресенское
- Village
- Location within Vologda Oblast Location within Russia
- Coordinates: 59°19′N 39°37′E
- Country: Russia
- Region: Vologda Oblast
- District: Vologodsky District
- Time zone: UTC+3:00

Skresenskoye (Russian: Скресенское) is a rural locality (a village) in Mayskoye Rural Settlement, Vologodsky District, Vologda Oblast, Russia. The population was 1 as of 2002.

== Geography ==
Skresenskoye is located 22 km northwest of Vologda (the district's administrative centre) by road. Pestovo is the nearest rural locality.
