= Slobodishcha =

Slobodishcha Слободища
- Village
- Location within Vologda Oblast Location within Russia
- Coordinates: 59°20′N 39°24′E
- Country: Russia
- Region: Vologda Oblast
- District: Vologodsky District
- Time zone: UTC+3:00

Slobodishcha (Russian: Слободища) is a rural locality (a village) in Kubenskoye Rural Settlement, Vologodsky District, Vologda Oblast, Russia. The population was 2 as of 2002.

== Geography ==
Slobodishcha is located 49 km northwest of Vologda (the district's administrative centre) by road. Tokarevo is the nearest rural locality.
