= Travlivka =

Travlivka Травливка
- Village
- Location within Vologda Oblast Location within Russia
- Coordinates: 58°53′N 38°17′E
- Country: Russia
- Region: Vologda Oblast
- District: Cherepovetsky District
- Time zone: UTC+3:00

Travlivka (Russian: Травливка) is a rural locality (a village) in Myaksinskoye Rural Settlement, Cherepovetsky District, Vologda Oblast, Russia. The population was 13 as of 2002.

== Geography ==
Travlivka is located 42 km southeast of Cherepovets (the district's administrative centre) by road. Stepantsevo is the nearest rural locality.
