= Vedrakovo =

Vedrakovo Ведраково
- Village
- Location within Vologda Oblast Location within Russia
- Coordinates: 59°34′N 39°20′E
- Country: Russia
- Region: Vologda Oblast
- District: Vologodsky District
- Time zone: UTC+3:00

Vedrakovo (Russian: Ведраково) is a rural locality (a village) in Novlenskoye Rural Settlement, Vologodsky District, Vologda Oblast, Russia. The population was 8 as of 2002.

== Geography ==
Vedrakovo is located 57 km northwest of Vologda (the district's administrative centre) by road. Popovka is the nearest rural locality.
