= Volshnitsy =

Volshnitsy Волшницы
- Village
- Location within Vologda Oblast Location within Russia
- Coordinates: 59°33′N 39°13′E
- Country: Russia
- Region: Vologda Oblast
- District: Vologodsky District
- Time zone: UTC+3:00

Volshnitsy (Russian: Волшницы) is a rural locality (a village) in Novlenskoye Rural Settlement, Vologodsky District, Vologda Oblast, Russia. The population was 16 as of 2002.

== Geography ==
Volshnitsy is located 68 km northwest of Vologda (the district's administrative centre) by road. Panovo is the nearest rural locality.
