= Yesyukovo =

Yesyukovo Есюково
- Village
- Location within Vologda Oblast Location within Russia
- Coordinates: 59°19′N 39°03′E
- Country: Russia
- Region: Vologda Oblast
- District: Vologodsky District
- Time zone: UTC+3:00

Yesyukovo (Russian: Есюково) is a rural locality (a village) in Staroselskoye Rural Settlement, Vologodsky District, Vologda Oblast, Russia. The population was 5 as of 2002.

== Geography ==
Yesyukovo is located 70 km northwest of Vologda (the district's administrative centre) by road. Zakharyino is the nearest rural locality.
