= Babtsyno =

Babtsyno Бабцыно
- Village
- Location within Vologda Oblast Location within Russia
- Coordinates: 59°10′N 39°32′E
- Country: Russia
- Region: Vologda Oblast
- District: Vologodsky District
- Time zone: UTC+3:00

Babtsyno (Russian: Бабцыно) is a rural locality (a village) in Sosnovskoye Rural Settlement, Vologodsky District, Vologda Oblast, Russia. The population was 3 as of 2002.

== Geography ==
Babtsyno is located 24 km southwest of Vologda (the district's administrative centre) by road. Savkino is the nearest rural locality.
