= Dekteri =

Dekteri Дектери
- Village
- Location within Vologda Oblast Location within Russia
- Coordinates: 59°24′N 38°59′E
- Country: Russia
- Region: Vologda Oblast
- District: Vologodsky District
- Time zone: UTC+3:00

Dekteri (Russian: Дектери) is a rural locality (a village) in Kubenskoye Rural Settlement, Vologodsky District, Vologda Oblast, Russia. The population was 25 as of 2002. There are 2 streets.

== Geography ==
Dekteri is located 72 km northwest of Vologda (the district's administrative centre) by road. Kunovo is the nearest rural locality.
