= Gureyevo =

Gureyevo Гуреево
- Village
- Location within Vologda Oblast Location within Russia
- Coordinates: 59°43′N 39°03′E
- Country: Russia
- Region: Vologda Oblast
- District: Vologodsky District
- Time zone: UTC+3:00

Gureyevo (Russian: Гуреево) is a rural locality (a village) in Novlenskoye Rural Settlement, Vologodsky District, Vologda Oblast, Russia. The population was 7 as of 2002.

== Geography ==
Gureyevo is located 85 km northwest of Vologda (the district's administrative centre) by road. Katalovskoye is the nearest rural locality.
