= Khripilevo =

Khripilevo Хрипилево
- Village
- Location within Vologda Oblast Location within Russia
- Coordinates: 59°26′N 39°35′E
- Country: Russia
- Region: Vologda Oblast
- District: Vologodsky District
- Time zone: UTC+3:00

Khripilevo (Russian: Хрипилево) is a rural locality (a village) in Kubenskoye Rural Settlement, Vologodsky District, Vologda Oblast, Russia. The population was 5 as of 2002.

== Geography ==
Khripilevo is located 35 km northwest of Vologda (the district's administrative centre) by road. Barachevo is the nearest rural locality.
