= Kuleshevo =

Kuleshevo Кулешево
- Village
- Location within Vologda Oblast Location within Russia
- Coordinates: 59°27′N 39°38′E
- Country: Russia
- Region: Vologda Oblast
- District: Vologodsky District
- Time zone: UTC+3:00

Kuleshevo (Russian: Кулешево) is a rural locality (a village) in Kubenskoye Rural Settlement, Vologodsky District, Vologda Oblast, Russia. The population was 2 as of 2002.

== Geography ==
Kuleshevo is located 33 km northwest of Vologda (the district's administrative centre) by road. Manino is the nearest rural locality.
