= Lebzino =

Lebzino Лебзино
- Village
- Location within Vologda Oblast Location within Russia
- Coordinates: 59°41′22″N 38°54′44″E
- Country: Russia
- Region: Vologda Oblast
- District: Vologodsky District
- Time zone: UTC+3:00

Lebzino (Russian: Лебзино) is a rural locality (a village) in Novlenskoye Rural Settlement, Vologodsky District, Vologda Oblast, Russia. The population was 21 as of 2002.

== Geography ==
Lebzino is located 92 km northwest of Vologda (the district's administrative centre) by road. Mikhalevo is the nearest rural locality.
