= Odoleikha =

Odoleikha Одолеиха
- Village
- Location within Vologda Oblast Location within Russia
- Coordinates: 59°21′N 39°15′E
- Country: Russia
- Region: Vologda Oblast
- District: Vologodsky District
- Time zone: UTC+3:00

Odoleikha (Russian: Одолеиха) is a rural locality (a village) in Kubenskoye Rural Settlement, Vologodsky District, Vologda Oblast, Russia. The population was 6 as of 2002.

== Geography ==
Odoleikha is located 62 km northwest of Vologda (the district's administrative centre) by road. Isakovo is the nearest rural locality.
