= Opuchkovo =

Opuchkovo Опучково
- Village
- Location within Vologda Oblast Location within Russia
- Coordinates: 59°09′N 39°24′E
- Country: Russia
- Region: Vologda Oblast
- District: Vologodsky District
- Time zone: UTC+3:00

Opuchkovo (Russian: Опучково) is a rural locality (a village) in Staroselskoye Rural Settlement, Vologodsky District, Vologda Oblast, Russia. The population was 5 as of 2002.

== Geography ==
Opuchkovo is located 30 km southwest of Vologda (the district's administrative centre) by road. Nikulino is the nearest rural locality.
