= Yesyunino =

Yesyunino Есюнино
- Village
- Location within Vologda Oblast Location within Russia
- Coordinates: 59°39′N 39°17′E
- Country: Russia
- Region: Vologda Oblast
- District: Vologodsky District
- Time zone: UTC+3:00

Yesyunino (Russian: Есюнино) is a rural locality (a village) in Novlenskoye Rural Settlement, Vologodsky District, Vologda Oblast, Russia. The population was 4 as of 2002.

== Geography ==
Yesyunino is located 63 km northwest of Vologda (the district's administrative centre) by road. Plyushchevo is the nearest rural locality.
