= Brodki, Vologda Oblast =

Brodki Бродки
- Village
- Location within Vologda Oblast Location within Russia
- Coordinates: 58°57′N 39°28′E
- Country: Russia
- Region: Vologda Oblast
- District: Vologodsky District
- Time zone: UTC+3:00

Brodki (Russian: Бродки) is a rural locality (a village) in Spasskoye Rural Settlement, Vologodsky District, Vologda Oblast, Russia. The population was 1 as of 2002.

== Geography ==
Brodki is located 54 km southwest of Vologda (the district's administrative centre) by road. Dovodchikovo is the nearest rural locality.
