= Knyazhovo =

Knyazhovo Княжово
- Village
- Location within Vologda Oblast Location within Russia
- Coordinates: 59°16′N 39°28′E
- Country: Russia
- Region: Vologda Oblast
- District: Vologodsky District
- Time zone: UTC+3:00

Knyazhovo (Russian: Княжово) is a rural locality (a village) in Mayskoye Rural Settlement, Vologodsky District, Vologda Oblast, Russia. The population was 19 as of 2002.

== Geography ==
Knyazhovo is located 31 km northwest of Vologda (the district's administrative centre) by road. Pochenga is the nearest rural locality.
