= Lantyevo =

Lantyevo Лантьево
- Village
- Location within Vologda Oblast Location within Russia
- Coordinates: 59°08′N 39°34′E
- Country: Russia
- Region: Vologda Oblast
- District: Vologodsky District
- Time zone: UTC+3:00

Lantyevo (Russian: Лантьево) is a rural locality (a village) in Sosnovskoye Rural Settlement, Vologodsky District, Vologda Oblast, Russia. The population was 4 as of 2002.

== Geography ==
Lantyevo is located 28 km southwest of Vologda (the district's administrative centre) by road. Vatalino is the nearest rural locality.
