= Maslozavod =

Maslozavod Маслозавод
- Village
- Location within Vologda Oblast Location within Russia
- Coordinates: 59°21′N 39°29′E
- Country: Russia
- Region: Vologda Oblast
- District: Vologodsky District
- Time zone: UTC+3:00

Maslozavod (Russian: Маслозавод) is a rural locality (a village) in Kubenskoye Rural Settlement, Vologodsky District, Vologda Oblast, Russia. The population was 11 as of 2002.

== Geography ==
The distance to Vologda is 43 km, to Kubenskoye is 13 km. Nesvoyskoye is the nearest rural locality.
