= Omogayevo =

Omogayevo Омогаево
- Village
- Location within Vologda Oblast Location within Russia
- Coordinates: 59°42′N 38°59′E
- Country: Russia
- Region: Vologda Oblast
- District: Vologodsky District
- Time zone: UTC+3:00

Omogayevo (Russian: Омогаево) is a rural locality (a village) in Novlenskoye Rural Settlement, Vologodsky District, Vologda Oblast, Russia. The population was 11 as of 2002.

== Geography ==
Omogayevo is located 87 km northwest of Vologda (the district's administrative centre) by road. Malashkovo is the nearest rural locality.
