= Tokovye =

Tokovye Токовые
- Village
- Location within Vologda Oblast Location within Russia
- Coordinates: 58°57′N 38°49′E
- Country: Russia
- Region: Vologda Oblast
- District: Cherepovetsky District
- Time zone: UTC+3:00

Tokovye (Russian: Токовые) is a rural locality (a village) in Yugskoye Rural Settlement, Cherepovetsky District, Vologda Oblast, Russia. The population was 1 as of 2002.

== Geography ==
Tokovye is located 73 km southeast of Cherepovets (the district's administrative centre) by road. Spas-Lom is the nearest rural locality.
