= Androntsevo =

Androntsevo Андронцево
- Village
- Location within Vologda Oblast Location within Russia
- Coordinates: 59°23′N 39°13′E
- Country: Russia
- Region: Vologda Oblast
- District: Vologodsky District
- Time zone: UTC+3:00

Androntsevo (Russian: Андронцево) is a rural locality (a village) in Kubenskoye Rural Settlement, Vologodsky District, Vologda Oblast, Russia. The population was 2 as of 2002.

== Geography ==
Androntsevo is located 57 km northwest of Vologda (the district's administrative centre) by road. Sindosh is the nearest rural locality.
