= Barskukovo =

Barskukovo Барсуково
- Village
- Location within Vologda Oblast Location within Russia
- Coordinates: 59°34′N 39°11′E
- Country: Russia
- Region: Vologda Oblast
- District: Vologodsky District
- Time zone: UTC+3:00

Barskukovo (Russian: Барсуково) is a rural locality (a village) in Novlenskoye Rural Settlement, Vologodsky District, Vologda Oblast, Russia. The population was 2 as of 2002.

== Geography ==
Barskukovo is located 71 km northwest of Vologda (the district's administrative centre) by road. Antonovo is the nearest rural locality.
