= Boltino =

Boltino Болтино
- Village
- Location within Vologda Oblast Location within Russia
- Coordinates: 59°10′N 39°52′E
- Country: Russia
- Region: Vologda Oblast
- District: Vologodsky District
- Time zone: UTC+3:00

Boltino (Russian: Болтино) is a rural locality (a village) in Spasskoye Rural Settlement, Vologodsky District, Vologda Oblast, Russia. The population was 11 as of 2002. There are 6 streets.

== Geography ==
Boltino is located 8 km south of Vologda (the district's administrative centre) by road. Kiriki-Ulita is the nearest rural locality.
