= Grozilovo =

Grozilovo Грозилово
- Village
- Location within Vologda Oblast Location within Russia
- Coordinates: 59°45′N 39°07′E
- Country: Russia
- Region: Vologda Oblast
- District: Vologodsky District
- Time zone: UTC+3:00

Grozilovo (Russian: Грозилово) is a rural locality (a village) in Novlenskoye Rural Settlement, Vologodsky District, Vologda Oblast, Russia. The population was 10 as of 2002.

== Geography ==
Grozilovo is located 82 km northwest of Vologda (the district's administrative centre) by road. Selishcha is the nearest rural locality.
