= Khorobrets =

Khorobrets Хоробрец
- Village
- Location within Vologda Oblast Location within Russia
- Coordinates: 59°16′N 39°17′E
- Country: Russia
- Region: Vologda Oblast
- District: Vologodsky District
- Time zone: UTC+3:00

Khorobrets (Russian: Хоробрец) is a rural locality (a village) in Staroselskoye Rural Settlement, Vologodsky District, Vologda Oblast, Russia. The population was 2 as of 2002.

== Geography ==
Khorobrets is located 64 km west of Vologda (the district's administrative centre) by road. Rezvino is the nearest rural locality.
