= Kovshovo =

Kovshovo Ковшово
- Village
- Location within Vologda Oblast Location within Russia
- Coordinates: 59°20′N 39°00′E
- Country: Russia
- Region: Vologda Oblast
- District: Vologodsky District
- Time zone: UTC+3:00

Kovshovo (Russian: Ковшово) is a rural locality (a village) in Staroselskoye Rural Settlement, Vologodsky District, Vologda Oblast, Russia. The population was 4 as of 2002.

== Geography ==
Kovshovo is located 72 km northwest of Vologda (the district's administrative centre) by road. Popadyino is the nearest rural locality.
