= Loptunovo =

Loptunovo Лоптуново
- Village
- Location within Vologda Oblast Location within Russia
- Coordinates: 59°06′N 39°56′E
- Country: Russia
- Region: Vologda Oblast
- District: Vologodsky District
- Time zone: UTC+3:00

Loptunovo (Russian: Лоптуново) is a rural locality (a village) in Podlesnoye Rural Settlement, Vologodsky District, Vologda Oblast, Russia. The population was 2 as of 2002.

== Geography ==
Loptunovo is located 17 km south of Vologda (the district's administrative centre) by road. Golenevo is the nearest rural locality.
