= Skripilovo =

Skripilovo Скрипилово
- Village
- Location within Vologda Oblast Location within Russia
- Coordinates: 59°06′N 39°12′E
- Country: Russia
- Region: Vologda Oblast
- District: Vologodsky District
- Time zone: UTC+3:00

Skripilovo (Russian: Скрипилово) is a rural locality (a village) in Kubenskoye Rural Settlement, Vologodsky District, Vologda Oblast, Russia. The population was 12 as of 2002.

== Geography ==
Skripilovo is located 43 km southwest of Vologda (the district's administrative centre) by road. Dor is the nearest rural locality.
