= Supronovo =

Supronovo Супроново
- Village
- Location within Vologda Oblast Location within Russia
- Coordinates: 58°55′N 37°14′E
- Country: Russia
- Region: Vologda Oblast
- District: Cherepovetsky District
- Time zone: UTC+3:00

Supronovo (Russian: Супроново) is a rural locality (a village) in Korotovskoye Rural Settlement, Cherepovetsky District, Vologda Oblast, Russia. The population was 27 as of 2002.

== Geography ==
Supronovo is located 67 km southwest of Cherepovets (the district's administrative centre) by road. Chayevo is the nearest rural locality.
