= Svetilki =

Svetilki Светилки
- Village
- Location within Vologda Oblast Location within Russia
- Coordinates: 59°08′N 39°10′E
- Country: Russia
- Region: Vologda Oblast
- District: Vologodsky District
- Time zone: UTC+3:00

Svetilki (Russian: Светилки) is a rural locality (a village) in Staroselskoye Rural Settlement, Vologodsky District, Vologda Oblast, Russia. The population was 23 as of 2002. There are 2 streets.

== Geography ==
Svetilki is located 46 km west of Vologda (the district's administrative centre) by road. Besednoye is the nearest rural locality.
