= Tereben =

Tereben Теребень
- Village
- Location within Vologda Oblast Location within Russia
- Coordinates: 59°12′N 37°38′E
- Country: Russia
- Region: Vologda Oblast
- District: Cherepovetsky District
- Time zone: UTC+3:00

Tereben (Russian: Теребень) is a rural locality (a village) in Nelazskoye Rural Settlement, Cherepovetsky District, Vologda Oblast, Russia. The population was 6 as of 2002.

== Geography ==
Tereben is located 25 km northwest of Cherepovets (the district's administrative centre) by road. Cherepovetskaya is the nearest rural locality.
