= Trofimovo =

Trofimovo Трофимово
- Village
- Location within Vologda Oblast Location within Russia
- Coordinates: 59°06′N 39°34′E
- Country: Russia
- Region: Vologda Oblast
- District: Vologodsky District
- Time zone: UTC+3:00

Trofimovo (Russian: Трофимово) is a rural locality (a village) in Sosnovskoye Rural Settlement, Vologodsky District, Vologda Oblast, Russia. The population was 6 as of 2002.

== Geography ==
Trofimovo is located 30 km southwest of Vologda (the district's administrative centre) by road. Gorka is the nearest rural locality.
