= Tynovo =

Tynovo Тыново
- Village
- Location within Vologda Oblast Location within Russia
- Coordinates: 58°58′N 37°05′E
- Country: Russia
- Region: Vologda Oblast
- District: Cherepovetsky District
- Time zone: UTC+3:00

Tynovo (Russian: Тыново) is a rural locality (a village) in Korotovskoye Rural Settlement, Cherepovetsky District, Vologda Oblast, Russia. The population was 20 as of 2002.

== Geography ==
Tynovo is located 68 km northeast of Cherepovets (the district's administrative centre) by road. Kotovo is the nearest rural locality.
