= Anchakovo =

Anchakovo Анчаково
- Village
- Location within Vologda Oblast Location within Russia
- Coordinates: 59°12′N 39°13′E
- Country: Russia
- Region: Vologda Oblast
- District: Vologodsky District
- Time zone: UTC+3:00

Anchakovo (Russian: Анчаково) is a rural locality (a village) in Staroselskoye Rural Settlement, Vologodsky District, Vologda Oblast, Russia. The population was 9 as of 2002.

== Geography ==
Anchakovo is located 47 km west of Vologda (the district's administrative centre) by road. Ostyunino is the nearest rural locality.
