= Buyanovo =

Buyanovo Буяново
- Village
- Location within Vologda Oblast Location within Russia
- Coordinates: 59°25′N 39°36′E
- Country: Russia
- Region: Vologda Oblast
- District: Vologodsky District
- Time zone: UTC+3:00

Buyanovo (Russian: Буяново) is a rural locality (a village) in Kubenskoye Rural Settlement, Vologodsky District, Vologda Oblast, Russia. The population was 3 as of 2002.

== Geography ==
Buyanovo is located 33 km northwest of Vologda (the district's administrative centre) by road. Shushkovo is the nearest rural locality.
