= Kozino, Vologda Oblast =

Kozino Козино
- Village
- Location within Vologda Oblast Location within Russia
- Coordinates: 59°10′N 39°57′E
- Country: Russia
- Region: Vologda Oblast
- District: Vologodsky District
- Time zone: UTC+3:00

Kozino (Russian: Козино) is a rural locality (a village) in Sosnovskoye Rural Settlement, Vologodsky District, Vologda Oblast, Russia. The population was 13 as of 2002.

== Geography ==
Kozino is located 8 km southeast of Vologda (the district's administrative centre) by road. Yarilovo is the nearest rural locality.
