= Malashkovo =

Malashkovo Малашково
- Village
- Location within Vologda Oblast Location within Russia
- Coordinates: 59°42′N 38°59′E
- Country: Russia
- Region: Vologda Oblast
- District: Vologodsky District
- Time zone: UTC+3:00

Malashkovo (Russian: Малашково) is a rural locality (a village) in Novlenskoye Rural Settlement, Vologodsky District, Vologda Oblast, Russia. The population was 15 as of 2002.

== Geography ==
Malashkovo is located 86 km northwest of Vologda (the district's administrative centre) by road. Taraskovo is the nearest rural locality.
