= Mironositsa =

Mironositsa Мироносица
- Village
- Location within Vologda Oblast Location within Russia
- Coordinates: 59°05′N 39°54′E
- Country: Russia
- Region: Vologda Oblast
- District: Vologodsky District
- Time zone: UTC+3:00

Mironositsa (Russian: Мироносица) is a rural locality (a village) in Podlesnoye Rural Settlement, Vologodsky District, Vologda Oblast, Russia. The population was 2 as of 2002.

== Geography ==
Mironositsa is located 19 km south of Vologda (the district's administrative centre) by road. Vasyunino is the nearest rural locality.
