= Molitvino =

Molitvino Молитвино
- Village
- Location within Vologda Oblast Location within Russia
- Coordinates: 59°10′N 39°36′E
- Country: Russia
- Region: Vologda Oblast
- District: Vologodsky District
- Time zone: UTC+3:00

Molitvino (Russian: Молитвино) is a rural locality (a village) in Sosnovskoye Rural Settlement, Vologodsky District, Vologda Oblast, Russia. The population was 5 as of 2002.

== Geography ==
Molitvino is located 21 km southwest of Vologda (the district's administrative centre) by road. Kindeyevo is the nearest rural locality.
