= Popadyino =

Popadyino Попадьино
- Village
- Location within Vologda Oblast Location within Russia
- Coordinates: 59°20′N 39°02′E
- Country: Russia
- Region: Vologda Oblast
- District: Vologodsky District
- Time zone: UTC+3:00

Popadyino (Russian: Попадьино) is a rural locality (a village) in Staroselskoye Rural Settlement, Vologodsky District, Vologda Oblast, Russia. The population was 48 as of 2002.

== Geography ==
Popadyino is located 71 km northwest of Vologda (the district's administrative centre) by road. Pogost Onochest is the nearest rural locality.
