= Shchapilino =

Shchapilino Щапилино
- Village
- Location within Vologda Oblast Location within Russia
- Coordinates: 59°10′N 39°24′E
- Country: Russia
- Region: Vologda Oblast
- District: Vologodsky District
- Time zone: UTC+3:00

Shchapilino (Russian: Щапилино) is a rural locality (a village) in Staroselskoye Rural Settlement, Vologodsky District, Vologda Oblast, Russia. The population was 2 as of 2002.

== Geography ==
Shchapilino is located 31 km west of Vologda (the district's administrative centre) by road. Obukhovo is the nearest rural locality.
