= Shelygino =

Shelygino Шелыгино
- Village
- Location within Vologda Oblast Location within Russia
- Coordinates: 59°09′N 39°44′E
- Country: Russia
- Region: Vologda Oblast
- District: Vologodsky District
- Time zone: UTC+3:00

Shelygino (Russian: Шелыгино) is a rural locality (a village) in Novlenskoye Rural Settlement, Vologodsky District, Vologda Oblast, Russia. The population was 3 as of 2002.

== Geography ==
Shelygino is located 18 km southwest of Vologda (the district's administrative centre) by road. Yaminovo is the nearest rural locality.
