= Susolovo =

Susolovo Сусолово
- Village
- Location within Vologda Oblast Location within Russia
- Coordinates: 59°09′N 39°26′E
- Country: Russia
- Region: Vologda Oblast
- District: Vologodsky District
- Time zone: UTC+3:00

Susolovo (Russian: Сусолово) is a rural locality (a village) in Staroselskoye Rural Settlement, Vologodsky District, Vologda Oblast, Russia. The population was 26 as of 2002.

== Geography ==
Susolovo is located 28 km southwest of Vologda (the district's administrative centre) by road. Sokolnikovo is the nearest rural locality.
