= Veretye, Cherepovetsky District, Vologda Oblast =

Veretye Веретье
- Village
- Location within Vologda Oblast Location within Russia
- Coordinates: 58°50′N 37°55′E
- Country: Russia
- Region: Vologda Oblast
- District: Cherepovetsky District
- Time zone: UTC+3:00

Veretye (Russian: Веретье) is a rural locality (a village) in Myaksinskoye Rural Settlement, Cherepovetsky District, Vologda Oblast, Russia. The population was 2 as of 2002.

== Geography ==
Veretye is located 108 km south of Cherepovets (the district's administrative centre) by road.
