= Vysochka =

Vysochka Высочка
- Village
- Location within Vologda Oblast Location within Russia
- Coordinates: 59°20′N 39°48′E
- Country: Russia
- Region: Vologda Oblast
- District: Vologodsky District
- Time zone: UTC+3:00

Vysochka (Russian: Высочка) is a rural locality (a village) in Semyonkovskoye Rural Settlement, Vologodsky District, Vologda Oblast, Russia. The population was 3 as of 2002.

== Geography ==
Vysochka is located 17 km northwest of Vologda (the district's administrative centre) by road. Dubrovskoye is the nearest rural locality.
