= Yepifanka =

Yepifanka Епифанка
- Village
- Location within Vologda Oblast Location within Russia
- Coordinates: 58°55′N 39°29′E
- Country: Russia
- Region: Vologda Oblast
- District: Vologodsky District
- Time zone: UTC+3:00

Yepifanka (Russian: Епифанка) is a rural locality (a village) in Spasskoye Rural Settlement, Vologodsky District, Vologda Oblast, Russia. The population was 20 as of 2002.

== Geography ==
Yepifanka is located 52 km southwest of Vologda (the district's administrative centre) by road. Norobovo is the nearest rural locality.
