= Anchutino =

Anchutino Анчутино
- Village
- Location within Vologda Oblast Location within Russia
- Coordinates: 59°22′N 39°33′E
- Country: Russia
- Region: Vologda Oblast
- District: Vologodsky District
- Time zone: UTC+3:00

Anchutino (Russian: Анчутино) is a rural locality (a village) in Kubenskoye Rural Settlement, Vologodsky District, Vologda Oblast, Russia. The population was 3 as of 2002.

== Geography ==
Anchutino is located 30 km northwest of Vologda (the district's administrative centre) by road. Pomygalovo is the nearest rural locality.
