= Andryushino =

Andryushino Андрюшино
- Village
- Location within Vologda Oblast Location within Russia
- Coordinates: 59°37′N 39°19′E
- Country: Russia
- Region: Vologda Oblast
- District: Vologodsky District
- Time zone: UTC+3:00

Andryushino (Russian: Андрюшино) is a rural locality (a village) in Novlenskoye Rural Settlement, Vologodsky District, Vologda Oblast, Russia. The population was 14 as of 2002.

== Geography ==
Andryushino is located 60 km northwest of Vologda (the district's administrative centre) by road. Korobovo is the nearest rural locality.
