= Bagrino =

Bagrino Багрино
- Village
- Location within Vologda Oblast Location within Russia
- Coordinates: 59°49′N 38°58′E
- Country: Russia
- Region: Vologda Oblast
- District: Vologodsky District
- Time zone: UTC+3:00

Bagrino (Russian: Багрино) is a rural locality (a village) in Novlenskoye Rural Settlement, Vologodsky District, Vologda Oblast, Russia. The population was 16 as of 2002.

== Geography ==
Bagrino is located 91 km northwest of Vologda (the district's administrative centre) by road. Kudryavtsevo is the nearest rural locality.
