= Bilkovo =

Bilkovo Бильково
- Village
- Location within Vologda Oblast Location within Russia
- Coordinates: 59°29′N 39°14′E
- Country: Russia
- Region: Vologda Oblast
- District: Vologodsky District
- Time zone: UTC+3:00

Bilkovo (Russian: Бильково) is a rural locality (a village) in Kubenskoye Rural Settlement, Vologodsky District, Vologda Oblast, Russia. The population was 3 as of 2002.

== Geography ==
Bilkovo is located 61 km northwest of Vologda (the district's administrative centre) by road. Isayevo is the nearest rural locality.
