= Bolotovo =

Bolotovo Болотово
- Village
- Location within Vologda Oblast Location within Russia
- Coordinates: 59°06′N 40°09′E
- Country: Russia
- Region: Vologda Oblast
- District: Vologodsky District
- Time zone: UTC+3:00

Bolotovo (Russian: Болотово) is a rural locality (a village) in Markovskoye Rural Settlement, Vologodsky District, Vologda Oblast, Russia. The population was 11 as of 2002.

== Geography ==
Bolotovo is located 26 km southeast of Vologda (the district's administrative centre) by road. Tishinovo is the nearest rural locality.
