= Derevyagino =

Derevyagino Деревягино
- Village
- Location within Vologda Oblast Location within Russia
- Coordinates: 59°05′N 39°13′E
- Country: Russia
- Region: Vologda Oblast
- District: Vologodsky District
- Time zone: UTC+3:00

Derevyagino (Russian: Деревягино) is a rural locality (a village) in Staroselskoye Rural Settlement, Vologodsky District, Vologda Oblast, Russia. The population was 2 as of 2002.

== Geography ==
Derevyagino is located 45 km southwest of Vologda (the district's administrative centre) by road. Dor is the nearest rural locality.
