= GES, Vologda Oblast =

GES ГЭС
- Settlement
- Location within Vologda Oblast Location within Russia
- Coordinates: 59°21′N 39°29′E
- Country: Russia
- Region: Vologda Oblast
- District: Vologodsky District
- Time zone: UTC+3:00

GES (Russian: ГЭС) is a rural locality (a settlement) in Kubenskoye Rural Settlement, Vologodsky District, Vologda Oblast, Russia. The population was 17 as of 2002.

== Geography ==
GES is located 44 km northwest of Vologda (the district's administrative centre) by road. Maslozavod is the nearest rural locality.
