= Kartsevo =

Kartsevo Карцево
- Village
- Location within Vologda Oblast Location within Russia
- Coordinates: 59°04′N 40°12′E
- Country: Russia
- Region: Vologda Oblast
- District: Vologodsky District
- Time zone: UTC+3:00

Kartsevo (Russian: Карцево) is a rural locality (a village) in Markovskoye Rural Settlement, Vologodsky District, Vologda Oblast, Russia. The population was 14 as of 2002.

== Geography ==
Kartsevo is located 29 km southeast of Vologda (the district's administrative centre) by road. Kalinkino is the nearest rural locality.
