= Kedrovo =

Kedrovo Кедрово
- Village
- Location within Vologda Oblast Location within Russia
- Coordinates: 59°13′N 39°36′E
- Country: Russia
- Region: Vologda Oblast
- District: Vologodsky District
- Time zone: UTC+3:00

Kedrovo (Russian: Кедрово) is a rural locality (a village) in Leskovskoye Rural Settlement, Vologodsky District, Vologda Oblast, Russia. The population was 2 as of 2002.

== Geography ==
Kedrovo is located 21 km west of Vologda (the district's administrative centre) by road. Nagorye is the nearest rural locality.
