= Koino =

Koino Коино
- Village
- Location within Vologda Oblast Location within Russia
- Coordinates: 58°58′N 38°17′E
- Country: Russia
- Region: Vologda Oblast
- District: Cherepovetsky District
- Time zone: UTC+3:00

Koino (Russian: Коино) is a rural locality (a village) in Yugskoye Rural Settlement, Cherepovetsky District, Vologda Oblast, Russia. The population was 9 as of 2002.

== Geography ==
Koino is located 38 km (24 mi) southeast of Cherepovets (the district's administrative centre) by road. Bavlenskoye is the nearest rural locality.
