= Korotkovo =

Korotkovo Коротково
- Village
- Location within Vologda Oblast Location within Russia
- Coordinates: 59°23′N 39°44′E
- Country: Russia
- Region: Vologda Oblast
- District: Vologodsky District
- Time zone: UTC+3:00

Korotkovo (Russian: Коротково) is a rural locality (a village) in Kubenskoye Rural Settlement, Vologodsky District, Vologda Oblast, Russia. The population was 777 as of 2002.

== Geography ==
Korotkovo is located 24 km northwest of Vologda (the district's administrative centre) by road. Ileykino is the nearest rural locality.
