= Kotlovo =

Kotlovo Котлово
- Village
- Location within Vologda Oblast Location within Russia
- Coordinates: 59°33′N 39°27′E
- Country: Russia
- Region: Vologda Oblast
- District: Vologodsky District
- Time zone: UTC+3:00

Kotlovo (Russian: Котлово) is a rural locality (a village) in Novlenskoye Rural Settlement, Vologodsky District, Vologda Oblast, Russia. The population was 6 as of 2002.

== Geography ==
Kotlovo is located 51 km northwest of Vologda (the district's administrative centre) by road. Viselkino is the nearest rural locality.
