= Leushkino =

Leushkino Леушкино
- Village
- Location within Vologda Oblast Location within Russia
- Coordinates: 59°05′N 39°49′E
- Country: Russia
- Region: Vologda Oblast
- District: Vologodsky District
- Time zone: UTC+3:00

Leushkino (Russian: Леушкино) is a rural locality (a village) in Spasskoye Rural Settlement, Vologodsky District, Vologda Oblast, Russia. The population was 6 as of 2002.

== Geography ==
Leushkino is located 31 km southwest of Vologda (the district's administrative centre) by road. Pykhmarevo is the nearest rural locality.
