= Liminsky =

Liminsky Лиминский
- Settlement
- Location within Vologda Oblast Location within Russia
- Coordinates: 59°14′N 40°03′E
- Country: Russia
- Region: Vologda Oblast
- District: Vologodsky District
- Time zone: UTC+3:00

Liminsky (Russian: Лиминский) is a rural locality (a settlement) in Podlesnoye Rural Settlement, Vologodsky District, Vologda Oblast, Russia. The population was 34 as of 2010.

== Geography ==
Liminsky is located 11 km northeast of Vologda (the district's administrative centre) by road. Baranki gnu - nearest village.
