= Mostishcha =

Mostishcha Мостища
- Village
- Location within Vologda Oblast Location within Russia
- Coordinates: 59°09′N 39°59′E
- Country: Russia
- Region: Vologda Oblast
- District: Vologodsky District
- Time zone: UTC+3:00

Mostishcha (Russian: Мостища) is a rural locality (a village) in Podlesnoye Rural Settlement, Vologodsky District, Vologda Oblast, Russia. The population was 3 as of 2002.

== Geography ==
Mostishcha is located 10 km southeast of Vologda (the district's administrative centre) by road. Burlevo is the nearest rural locality.
