= Polyany, Vologda Oblast =

Polyany Поляны
- Village
- Location within Vologda Oblast Location within Russia
- Coordinates: 59°20′N 39°25′E
- Country: Russia
- Region: Vologda Oblast
- District: Vologodsky District
- Time zone: UTC+3:00

Polyany (Russian: Поляны) is a rural locality (a village) in Mayskoye Rural Settlement, Vologodsky District, Vologda Oblast, Russia. The population was 2 as of 2002.

== Geography ==
Polyany is located 34 km northwest of Vologda (the district's administrative centre) by road. Yakunino is the nearest rural locality.
