= Seredneye =

Seredneye Середнее
- Village
- Location within Vologda Oblast Location within Russia
- Coordinates: 59°24′N 39°06′E
- Country: Russia
- Region: Vologda Oblast
- District: Vologodsky District
- Time zone: UTC+3:00

Seredneye (Russian: Середнее) is a rural locality (a village) in Kubenskoye Rural Settlement, Vologodsky District, Vologda Oblast, Russia. The population was 13 as of 2002.

== Geography ==
Seredneye is located 64 km northwest of Vologda (the district's administrative centre) by road. Severnaya Ferma is the nearest rural locality.
