= Skryabino =

Skryabino Скрябино
- Village
- Location within Vologda Oblast Location within Russia
- Coordinates: 59°02′N 40°03′E
- Country: Russia
- Region: Vologda Oblast
- District: Vologodsky District
- Time zone: UTC+3:00

Skryabino (Russian: Скрябино) is a rural locality (a village) in Kubenskoye Rural Settlement, Vologodsky District, Vologda Oblast, Russia. The population was 1 as of 2002.

== Geography ==
Skryabino is located 24 km southeast of Vologda (the district's administrative centre) by road. Chekmenevo is the nearest rural locality.
