= Andrakovo =

Andrakovo Андраково
- Village
- Location within Vologda Oblast Location within Russia
- Coordinates: 59°09′N 39°15′E
- Country: Russia
- Region: Vologda Oblast
- District: Vologodsky District
- Time zone: UTC+3:00

Andrakovo (Russian: Андраково) is a rural locality (a village) in Staroselskoye Rural Settlement, Vologodsky District, Vologda Oblast, Russia. The population was 1 as of 2002.

== Geography ==
Andrakovo is located 45 km southwest of Vologda (the district's administrative centre) by road. Duplino is the nearest rural locality.
