= Cherneyevo =

Cherneyevo Чернеево
- Village
- Location within Vologda Oblast Location within Russia
- Coordinates: 59°18′N 39°19′E
- Country: Russia
- Region: Vologda Oblast
- District: Vologodsky District
- Time zone: UTC+3:00

Cherneyevo (Russian: Чернеево) is a village in Staroselskoye Rural Settlement, Vologodsky District, Vologda Oblast, Russia. The population was 12 as of 2002.

== Geography ==
Cherneyevo is located 70 km northwest of Vologda, the district's administrative centre, by road. Ivonino is the nearest rural locality.
