= Gureikha =

Gureikha Гуреиха
- Village
- Location within Vologda Oblast Location within Russia
- Coordinates: 59°14′N 39°07′E
- Country: Russia
- Region: Vologda Oblast
- District: Vologodsky District
- Time zone: UTC+3:00

Gureikha (Russian: Гуреиха) is a rural locality (a village) in Staroselskoye Rural Settlement, Vologodsky District, Vologda Oblast, Russia. The population was 11 as of 2002.

== Geography ==
Gureikha is located 54 km west of Vologda (the district's administrative centre) by road. Kipelovo is the nearest rural locality.
