= Kusyevo =

Kusyevo Кусьево
- Village
- Location within Vologda Oblast Location within Russia
- Coordinates: 59°16′N 39°03′E
- Country: Russia
- Region: Vologda Oblast
- District: Vologodsky District
- Time zone: UTC+3:00

Kusyevo (Russian: Кусьево) is a rural locality (a village) in Staroselskoye Rural Settlement, Vologodsky District, Vologda Oblast, Russia. The population was 16 as of 2002.

== Geography ==
Kusyevo is located 68 km west of Vologda (the district's administrative center) by road. Koskovo is the nearest rural locality.
