= Myagrino =

Myagrino Мягрино
- Village
- Location within Vologda Oblast Location within Russia
- Coordinates: 59°17′N 39°37′E
- Country: Russia
- Region: Vologda Oblast
- District: Vologodsky District
- Time zone: UTC+3:00

Myagrino (Russian: Мягрино) is a rural locality (a village) in Mayskoye Rural Settlement, Vologodsky District, Vologda Oblast, Russia. The population was 2 as of 2002.

== Geography ==
Myagrino is located 19 km northwest of Vologda (the district's administrative centre) by road. Mitenskoye is the nearest rural locality.
