= Tekar =

Tekar Текарь
- Village
- Location within Vologda Oblast Location within Russia
- Coordinates: 59°31′N 38°06′E
- Country: Russia
- Region: Vologda Oblast
- District: Cherepovetsky District
- Time zone: UTC+3:00

Tekar (Russian: Текарь) is a rural locality (a village) in Voskresenskoye Rural Settlement, Cherepovetsky District, Vologda Oblast, Russia. The population was 15 as of 2002.

== Geography ==
Tekar is located 56 km northeast of Cherepovets (the district's administrative center) by road. Deminskaya is the nearest rural locality.
