= Vasnevo =

Vasnevo Васнево
- Village
- Location within Vologda Oblast Location within Russia
- Coordinates: 59°03′N 39°50′E
- Country: Russia
- Region: Vologda Oblast
- District: Vologodsky District
- Time zone: UTC+3:00

Vasnevo (Russian: Васнево) is a rural locality (a village) in Spasskoye Rural Settlement, Vologodsky District, Vologda Oblast, Russia. The population was 3 as of 2002.

== Geography ==
Vasnevo is located 27 km south of Vologda (the district's administrative centre) by road. Kolokolovo is the nearest rural locality.
