= Viselkino =

Viselkino Виселкино
- Village
- Location within Vologda Oblast Location within Russia
- Coordinates: 59°33′N 39°28′E
- Country: Russia
- Region: Vologda Oblast
- District: Vologodsky District
- Time zone: UTC+3:00

Viselkino (Russian: Виселкино) is a rural locality (a village) in Novlenskoye Rural Settlement, Vologodsky District, Vologda Oblast, Russia. The population was 4 as of 2002.

== Geography ==
Viselkino is located 51 km northwest of Vologda (the district's administrative centre) by road. Kotlovo is the nearest rural locality.
