= Yarilovo =

Yarilovo Ярилово
- Village
- Location within Vologda Oblast Location within Russia
- Coordinates: 59°10′N 39°57′E
- Country: Russia
- Region: Vologda Oblast
- District: Vologodsky District
- Time zone: UTC+3:00

Yarilovo (Russian: Ярилово) is a rural locality (a village) in Podlesnoye Rural Settlement, Vologodsky District, Vologda Oblast, Russia. The population was 6 as of 2002.

== Geography ==
Yarilovo is located 8 km southeast of Vologda (the district's administrative centre) by road. Kozino is the nearest locality.
