= Baralovo =

Baralovo Баралово
- Village
- Location within Vologda Oblast Location within Russia
- Coordinates: 59°22′N 39°44′E
- Country: Russia
- Region: Vologda Oblast
- District: Vologodsky District
- Time zone: UTC+3:00

Baralovo (Russian: Баралово) is a rural locality (a village) in Kubenskoye Rural Settlement, Vologodsky District, Vologda Oblast, Russia. The population was 1 as of 2002.

== Geography ==
Baralovo is located 22 km northwest of Vologda (the district's administrative centre) by road. Kulemesovo is the nearest rural locality.
