= Migunovo =

Migunovo Мигуново
- Village
- Location within Vologda Oblast Location within Russia
- Coordinates: 59°29′N 39°18′E
- Country: Russia
- Region: Vologda Oblast
- District: Vologodsky District
- Time zone: UTC+3:00

Migunovo (Russian: Мигуново) is a rural locality (a village) in Kubenskoye Rural Settlement, Vologodsky District, Vologda Oblast, Russia. The population was 2 as of 2002.

== Geography ==
Migunovo is located 55 km northwest of Vologda (the district's administrative centre) by road. Durasikha is the nearest rural locality.
