= Mitenskoye =

Mitenskoye Митенское
- Village
- Location within Vologda Oblast Location within Russia
- Coordinates: 59°17′N 39°38′E
- Country: Russia
- Region: Vologda Oblast
- District: Vologodsky District
- Time zone: UTC+3:00

Mitenskoye (Russian: Митенское) is a rural locality (a village) in Mayskoye Rural Settlement, Vologodsky District, Vologda Oblast, Russia. The population was 5 as of 2002.

== Geography ==
The distance to Vologda is 19.5 km, to Maysky is 7 km. Pribytkovo is the nearest rural locality.
