= Norobovo =

Norobovo Норобово
- Village
- Location within Vologda Oblast Location within Russia
- Coordinates: 58°55′N 39°30′E
- Country: Russia
- Region: Vologda Oblast
- District: Vologodsky District
- Time zone: UTC+3:00

Norobovo (Russian: Норобово) is a rural locality (a village) in Spasskoye Rural Settlement, Vologodsky District, Vologda Oblast, Russia. The population was 4 as of 2002.

== Geography ==
Norobovo is located 48 km southwest of Vologda (the district's administrative centre) by road. Ilyinskoye is the nearest rural locality.
