= Paprikha =

Paprikha Паприха
- Station
- Location within Vologda Oblast Location within Russia
- Coordinates: 59°07′N 40°08′E
- Country: Russia
- Region: Vologda Oblast
- District: Vologodsky District
- Time zone: UTC+3:00

Paprikha (Russian: Паприха) is a rural locality (a station) in Markovskoye Rural Settlement, Vologodsky District, Vologda Oblast, Russia. The population was 1,302 as of 2002.

== Geography ==
Paprikha is located 27 km southeast of Vologda (the district's administrative centre) by road. Tishinovo is the nearest rural locality.
