= Syama, Vologda Oblast =

Syama Сяма
- Village
- Location within Vologda Oblast Location within Russia
- Coordinates: 59°41′N 39°12′E
- Country: Russia
- Region: Vologda Oblast
- District: Vologodsky District
- Time zone: UTC+3:00

Syama (Russian: Сяма) is a rural locality (a village) in Novlenskoye Rural Settlement, Vologodsky District, Vologda Oblast, Russia. The population was 2 as of 2002.

== Geography ==
Syama is located 69 km northwest of Vologda (the district's administrative centre) by road. Anfalovo is the nearest rural locality.
