= Timovo =

Timovo Тимово
- Village
- Location within Vologda Oblast Location within Russia
- Coordinates: 58°55′N 38°43′E
- Country: Russia
- Region: Vologda Oblast
- District: Cherepovetsky District
- Time zone: UTC+3:00

Timovo (Russian: Тимово) is a rural locality (a village) in Yugskoye Rural Settlement, Cherepovetsky District, Vologda Oblast, Russia. The population was 39 as of 2002.

== Geography ==
Timovo is located 66 km southeast of Cherepovets (the district's administrative centre) by road. Mydyevo is the nearest rural locality.
