= Fomkino =

Fomkino Фомкино
- Village
- Location within Vologda Oblast Location within Russia
- Coordinates: 59°29′N 39°34′E
- Country: Russia
- Region: Vologda Oblast
- District: Vologodsky District
- Time zone: UTC+3:00

Fomkino (Russian: Фомкино) is a rural locality (a village) in Kubenskoye Rural Settlement, Vologodsky District, Vologda Oblast, Russia. The population was 10 as of 2002.

== Geography ==
Fomkino is located 39 km northwest of Vologda (the district's administrative centre) by road. Turutino is the nearest rural locality.
