= Kurovo =

Kurovo Курово
- Village
- Location within Vologda Oblast Location within Russia
- Coordinates: 59°36′N 39°22′E
- Country: Russia
- Region: Vologda Oblast
- District: Vologodsky District
- Time zone: UTC+3:00

Kurovo (Russian: Курово) is a rural locality (a village) in Novlenskoye Rural Settlement, Vologodsky District, Vologda Oblast, Russia. The population was 2 as of 2002.

== Geography ==
Kurovo is located 56 km northwest of Vologda (the district's administrative centre) by road. Perkhuryevo is the nearest rural locality.
