= Makarovo, Kubenskoye Rural Settlement, Vologodsky District, Vologda Oblast =

Makarovo Макарово
- Selo
- Location within Vologda Oblast Location within Russia
- Coordinates: 59°23′N 39°15′E
- Country: Russia
- Region: Vologda Oblast
- District: Vologodsky District
- Time zone: UTC+3:00

Makarovo (Russian: Макарово) is a rural locality (a selo) in Kubenskoye Rural Settlement, Vologodsky District, Vologda Oblast, Russia. The population was 530 as of 2002.

== Geography ==
The distance to Vologda is 50 km.
