= Yelgino =

Yelgino Елгино
- Village
- Location within Vologda Oblast Location within Russia
- Coordinates: 59°02′N 40°01′E
- Country: Russia
- Region: Vologda Oblast
- District: Vologodsky District
- Time zone: UTC+3:00

Yelgino (Russian: Елгино) is a rural locality (a village) in Podlesnoye Rural Settlement, Vologodsky District, Vologda Oblast, Russia. The population was 12 as of 2002.

== Geography ==
Yelgino is located 24 km southeast of Vologda (the district's administrative centre) by road. Melnikovo is the nearest rural locality.
