= Batran =

Batran Батран
- Village
- Location within Vologda Oblast Location within Russia
- Coordinates: 58°57′N 38°24′E
- Country: Russia
- Region: Vologda Oblast
- District: Cherepovetsky District
- Time zone: UTC+3:00

Batran (Russian: Батран) is a rural locality (a village) in Yugskoye Rural Settlement, Cherepovetsky District, Vologda Oblast, Russia. The population was 65 as of 2002.

== Geography ==
Batran is located 42 km (26 mi) southeast of Cherepovets (the district's administrative centre) by road. Batransky is the nearest rural locality.
