= Larkino =

Larkino Ларькино
- Village
- Location within Vologda Oblast Location within Russia
- Coordinates: 59°40′N 39°02′E
- Country: Russia
- Region: Vologda Oblast
- District: Vologodsky District
- Time zone: UTC+3:00

Larkino (Russian: Ларькино) is a rural locality (a village) in Novlenskoye Rural Settlement, Vologodsky District, Vologda Oblast, Russia. The population was 2 as of 2002.

== Geography ==
Larkino is located 86 km northwest of Vologda (the district's administrative centre) by road. Pribytkovo is the nearest rural locality.
