= Malgino =

Malgino Мальгино
- Village
- Location within Vologda Oblast Location within Russia
- Coordinates: 59°03′N 40°05′E
- Country: Russia
- Region: Vologda Oblast
- District: Vologodsky District
- Time zone: UTC+3:00

Malgino (Russian: Мальгино) is a rural locality (a village) in Novlenskoye Rural Settlement, Vologodsky District, Vologda Oblast, Russia. The population was 58 as of 2002.

== Geography ==
Malgino is located 24 km southeast of Vologda (the district's administrative centre) by road. Chekmenevo is the nearest rural locality.
