= Mineyka =

Mineyka Минейка
- Village
- Location within Vologda Oblast Location within Russia
- Coordinates: 59°17′N 39°18′E
- Country: Russia
- Region: Vologda Oblast
- District: Vologodsky District
- Time zone: UTC+3:00

Mineyka (Russian: Минейка) is a rural locality (a village) in Staroselskoye Rural Settlement, Vologodsky District, Vologda Oblast, Russia. The population was 9 as of 2002.

== Geography ==
Mineyka is located 68 km northwest of Vologda (the district's administrative centre) by road. Sychevo is the nearest rural locality.
