= Ilekino =

Ilekino Илекино
- Village
- Location within Vologda Oblast Location within Russia
- Coordinates: 59°21′N 39°26′E
- Country: Russia
- Region: Vologda Oblast
- District: Vologodsky District
- Time zone: UTC+3:00

Ilekino (Russian: Илекино) is a rural locality (a village) in Kubenskoye Rural Settlement, Vologodsky District, Vologda Oblast, Russia. The population was 1 as of 2002.

== Geography ==
Ilekino is located 46 km northwest of Vologda (the district's administrative centre) by road. Semigory is the nearest rural locality.
