= Khmelina =

Khmelina Хмелина
- Village
- Location within Vologda Oblast Location within Russia
- Coordinates: 58°54′N 37°41′E
- Country: Russia
- Region: Vologda Oblast
- District: Cherepovetsky District
- Time zone: UTC+3:00

Khmelina (Russian: Хмелина) is a rural locality (a village) in Korotovskoye Rural Settlement, Cherepovetsky District, Vologda Oblast, Russia. The population was 6 as of 2002.

== Geography ==
Khmelina is located 86 km (53 mi) southwest of Cherepovets (the district's administrative centre) by road.
