= Mayega =

Mayega Маега
- Village
- Location within Vologda Oblast Location within Russia
- Coordinates: 59°18′N 39°57′E
- Country: Russia
- Region: Vologda Oblast
- District: Vologodsky District
- Time zone: UTC+3:00

Mayega (Russian: Маега) is a rural locality (a village) in Prilukskoye Rural Settlement, Vologodsky District, Vologda Oblast, Russia. The population was 15 as of 2002.

== Geography ==
Mayega is located 12 km northeast of Vologda (the district's administrative centre) by road. Semyonkovo-2 is the nearest rural locality.
