= Selishcha =

Selishcha Селища
- Village
- Location within Vologda Oblast Location within Russia
- Coordinates: 59°44′N 39°06′E
- Country: Russia
- Region: Vologda Oblast
- District: Vologodsky District
- Time zone: UTC+3:00

Selishcha (Russian: Селища) is a rural locality (a village) in Novlenskoye Rural Settlement, Vologodsky District, Vologda Oblast, Russia. The population was 28 as of 2002.

== Geography ==
Selishcha is located 81 km northwest of Vologda (the district's administrative centre) by road. Stepanovo is the nearest rural locality.
