= Lapach =

Lapach Лапач
- Village
- Location within Vologda Oblast Location within Russia
- Coordinates: 59°11′N 39°32′E
- Country: Russia
- Region: Vologda Oblast
- District: Vologodsky District
- Time zone: UTC+3:00

Lapach (Russian: Лапач) is a rural locality (a village) in Sosnovskoye Rural Settlement, Vologodsky District, Vologda Oblast, Russia. The population was 8 as of 2002.

== Geography ==
Lapach is located 23 km west of Vologda (the district's administrative centre) by road. Novy Istochnik is the nearest rural locality.
