= Shchipino =

Shchipino Щипино
- Village
- Location within Vologda Oblast Location within Russia
- Coordinates: 59°26′N 39°38′E
- Country: Russia
- Region: Vologda Oblast
- District: Vologodsky District
- Time zone: UTC+3:00

Shchipino (Russian: Щипино) is a rural locality (a village) in Kubenskoye Rural Settlement, Vologodsky District, Vologda Oblast, Russia. The population was 2 as of 2002.

== Geography ==
Shchipino is located 32 km north of Vologda (the district's administrative centre) by road. Irkhino is the nearest rural locality.
