= Terino =

Terino Терино
- Village
- Location within Vologda Oblast Location within Russia
- Coordinates: 59°27′N 38°00′E
- Country: Russia
- Region: Vologda Oblast
- District: Cherepovetsky District
- Time zone: UTC+3:00

Terino (Russian: Терино) is a rural locality (a village) in Voskresenskoye Rural Settlement, Cherepovetsky District, Vologda Oblast, Russia. The population was 2 as of 2002.

== Geography ==
Terino is located 48 km northeast of Cherepovets (the district's administrative centre) by road. Chuksha is the nearest rural locality.
