= Lifino =

Lifino Лифино
- Village
- Location within Vologda Oblast Location within Russia
- Coordinates: 59°09′N 39°23′E
- Country: Russia
- Region: Vologda Oblast
- District: Vologodsky District
- Time zone: UTC+3:00

Lifino (Russian: Лифино) is a rural locality (a village) in Staroselskoye Rural Settlement, Vologodsky District, Vologda Oblast, Russia. The population was 4 as of 2002.

== Geography ==
Lifino is located 34 km west of Vologda (the district's administrative centre) by road. Kharitonovo is the nearest rural locality.
