= Turutino =

Turutino Турутино
- Village
- Location within Vologda Oblast Location within Russia
- Coordinates: 59°29′N 39°33′E
- Country: Russia
- Region: Vologda Oblast
- District: Vologodsky District
- Time zone: UTC+3:00

Turutino (Russian: Турутино) is a rural locality (a village) in Kubenskoye Rural Settlement, Vologodsky District, Vologda Oblast, Russia. The population was 7 as of 2002.

== Geography ==
Turutino is located 40 km northwest of Vologda (the district's administrative centre) by road. Posykino is the nearest rural locality.
