= Beloye, Staroselskoye Rural Settlement, Vologodsky District, Vologda Oblast =

Beloye Белое
- Village
- Location within Vologda Oblast Location within Russia
- Coordinates: 59°16′N 39°37′E
- Country: Russia
- Region: Vologda Oblast
- District: Vologodsky District
- Time zone: UTC+3:00

Beloye (Russian: Белое) is a rural locality (a village) in Staroselskoye Rural Settlement, Vologodsky District, Vologda Oblast, Russia. The population was 2 as of 2002.

== Geography ==
The distance to Vologda is 40 km.
