= Lumba =

Lumba Лумба
- Station
- Location within Vologda Oblast Location within Russia
- Coordinates: 59°15′N 39°20′E
- Country: Russia
- Region: Vologda Oblast
- District: Vologodsky District
- Time zone: UTC+3:00

Lumba (Russian: Лумба) is a rural locality (a station) in Staroselskoye Rural Settlement, Vologodsky District, Vologda Oblast, Russia. The population was 3 as of 2002.

== Geography ==
Lumba is located 66 km west of Vologda (the district's administrative centre) by road. Semigorye is the nearest rural locality.
