= Meniki =

Meniki Меники
- Village
- Location within Vologda Oblast Location within Russia
- Coordinates: 59°12′N 39°30′E
- Country: Russia
- Region: Vologda Oblast
- District: Vologodsky District
- Time zone: UTC+3:00

Meniki (Russian: Меники) is a rural locality (a village) in Sosnovskoye Rural Settlement, Vologodsky District, Vologda Oblast, Russia. The population was 1 as of 2002.

== Geography ==
Meniki is located 25 km west of Vologda (the district's administrative centre) by road. Avdotyino is the nearest rural locality.
