= Andronino =

Andronino Андронино
- Village
- Location within Vologda Oblast Location within Russia
- Coordinates: 59°39′N 39°11′E
- Country: Russia
- Region: Vologda Oblast
- District: Vologodsky District
- Time zone: UTC+3:00

Andronino (Russian: Андронино) is a rural locality (a village) in Novlenskoye Rural Settlement, Vologodsky District, Vologda Oblast, Russia. The population was 5 as of 2002.

== Geography ==
It is located 73 km northwest of Vologda. Oleshevo is the nearest rural locality.
