= Perkhuryevo =

Perkhuryevo Перхурьево
- Village
- Location within Vologda Oblast Location within Russia
- Coordinates: 59°29′N 39°35′E
- Country: Russia
- Region: Vologda Oblast
- District: Vologodsky District
- Time zone: UTC+3:00

Perkhuryevo (Russian: Перхурьево) is a rural locality (a village) in Kubenskoye Rural Settlement, Vologodsky District, Vologda Oblast, Russia. The population was 8 as of 2002.

== Geography ==
The distance to Vologda is 38 km.
