= Abakshino =

Abakshino Абакшино
- Village
- Location within Vologda Oblast Location within Russia
- Coordinates: 59°18′N 39°43′E
- Country: Russia
- Region: Vologda Oblast
- District: Vologodsky District
- Time zone: [[UTC+3:00]]

Abakshino (Russian: Абакшино) is a rural locality (a village) in Mayskoye Rural Settlement of Vologodsky District, Vologda Oblast, Russia. The population was 120 as of 2002. There are 4 streets.
