= Anfalovo =

Anfalovo Анфалово
- Village
- Location within Vologda Oblast Location within Russia
- Coordinates: 59°41′N 39°12′E
- Country: Russia
- Region: Vologda Oblast
- District: Vologodsky District
- Time zone: UTC+3:00

Anfalovo (Russian: Анфалово) is a rural locality (a village) in Novlenskoye Rural Settlement, Vologodsky District, Vologda Oblast, Russia. The population was 3 as of 2002.
