= Ugolskoye =

Ugolskoye Угольское
- Village
- Location within Vologda Oblast Location within Russia
- Coordinates: 59°40′N 40°53′E
- Country: Russia
- Region: Vologda Oblast
- District: Sokolsky District
- Time zone: UTC+3:00

Ugolskoye (Russian: Угольское) is a rural locality (a village) in Vorobyovskoye Rural Settlement, Sokolsky District, Vologda Oblast, Russia. The population was 1 as of 2002.

== Geography ==
Ugolskoye is located 71 km northeast of Sokol (the district's administrative centre) by road. Mikhalevo is the nearest rural locality.
