= Zabolotka =

Zabolotka Заболотка
- Village
- Location within Vologda Oblast Location within Russia
- Coordinates: 59°27′N 40°00′E
- Country: Russia
- Region: Vologda Oblast
- District: Sokolsky District
- Time zone: UTC+3:00

Zabolotka (Russian: Заболотка) is a rural locality (a village) in Borovetskoye Rural Settlement, Sokolsky District, Vologda Oblast, Russia. The population was 2 as of 2002.

== Geography ==
Zabolotka is located 6 km west of Sokol (the district's administrative centre) by road. Trukhinka is the nearest rural locality.
