= Rodionovo, Sokolsky District, Vologda Oblast =

Rodionovo Родионово
- Village
- Location within Vologda Oblast Location within Russia
- Coordinates: 59°24′N 40°28′E
- Country: Russia
- Region: Vologda Oblast
- District: Sokolsky District
- Time zone: UTC+3:00

Rodionovo (Russian: Родионово) is a rural locality (a village) in Pelshemskoye Rural Settlement, Sokolsky District, Vologda Oblast, Russia. The population was 3 as of 2002.

== Geography ==
Rodionovo is located 37 km southeast of Sokol (the district's administrative centre) by road. Popovskoye is the nearest rural locality.
