= Mamonkino =

Mamonkino Мамонкино
- Village
- Location within Vologda Oblast Location within Russia
- Coordinates: 59°36′N 41°09′E
- Country: Russia
- Region: Vologda Oblast
- District: Sokolsky District
- Time zone: UTC+3:00

Mamonkino (Russian: Мамонкино) is a rural locality (a village) in Chuchkovskoye Rural Settlement, Sokolsky District, Vologda Oblast, Russia. The population was 9 as of 2002.

== Geography ==
Mamonkino is located 85 km northeast of Sokol (the district's administrative centre) by road. Gorka is the nearest rural locality.
