= Naliskoye =

Naliskoye Налиское
- Village
- Location within Vologda Oblast Location within Russia
- Coordinates: 59°28′N 40°24′E
- Country: Russia
- Region: Vologda Oblast
- District: Sokolsky District
- Time zone: UTC+3:00

Naliskoye (Russian: Налиское) is a rural locality (a village) in Pelshemskoye Rural Settlement, Sokolsky District, Vologda Oblast, Russia. The population was 2 as of 2002.

== Geography ==
Naliskoye is located 29 km east of Sokol (the district's administrative centre) by road. Turovo is the nearest rural locality.
