= Vasyutino, Sokolsky District, Vologda Oblast =

Vasyutino Васютино
- Village
- Location within Vologda Oblast Location within Russia
- Coordinates: 59°25′N 40°12′E
- Country: Russia
- Region: Vologda Oblast
- District: Sokolsky District
- Time zone: UTC+3:00

Vasyutino (Russian: Васютино) is a rural locality (a village) in Prigorodnoye Rural Settlement, Sokolsky District, Vologda Oblast, Russia. The population was 143 as of 2002.

== Geography ==
Vasyutino is located 13 km southeast of Sokol (the district's administrative centre) by road. Litega is the nearest rural locality.
