= Ryazanka, Sokolsky District, Vologda Oblast =

Ryazanka Рязанка
- Village
- Location within Vologda Oblast Location within Russia
- Coordinates: 59°30′N 39°59′E
- Country: Russia
- Region: Vologda Oblast
- District: Sokolsky District
- Time zone: UTC+3:00

Ryazanka (Russian: Рязанка) is a rural locality (a village) in Arkhangelskoye Rural Settlement, Sokolsky District, Vologda Oblast, Russia. The population was 37 as of 2002.

== Geography ==
Ryazanka is located 12 km northwest of Sokol (the district's administrative centre) by road. Perevoz is the nearest rural locality.
