= Shastovo-Zabereznoye =

Shastovo-Zabereznoye Шастово-Заберезное
- Village
- Location within Vologda Oblast Location within Russia
- Coordinates: 59°24′N 40°04′E
- Country: Russia
- Region: Vologda Oblast
- District: Sokolsky District
- Time zone: UTC+3:00

Shastovo-Zabereznoye (Russian: Шастово-Заберезное) is a rural locality (a village) in Prigorodnoye Rural Settlement, Sokolsky District, Vologda Oblast, Russia. The population was 1 as of 2002.

== Geography ==
Shastovo-Zabereznoye is located 16 km south of Sokol (the district's administrative centre) by road. Kamskoye is the nearest rural locality.
