= Pogost Ilyinsky, Sokolsky District, Vologda Oblast =

Pogost Ilyinsky Погост Ильинский
- Selo
- Location within Vologda Oblast Location within Russia
- Coordinates: 59°31′N 40°20′E
- Country: Russia
- Region: Vologda Oblast
- District: Sokolsky District
- Time zone: UTC+3:00

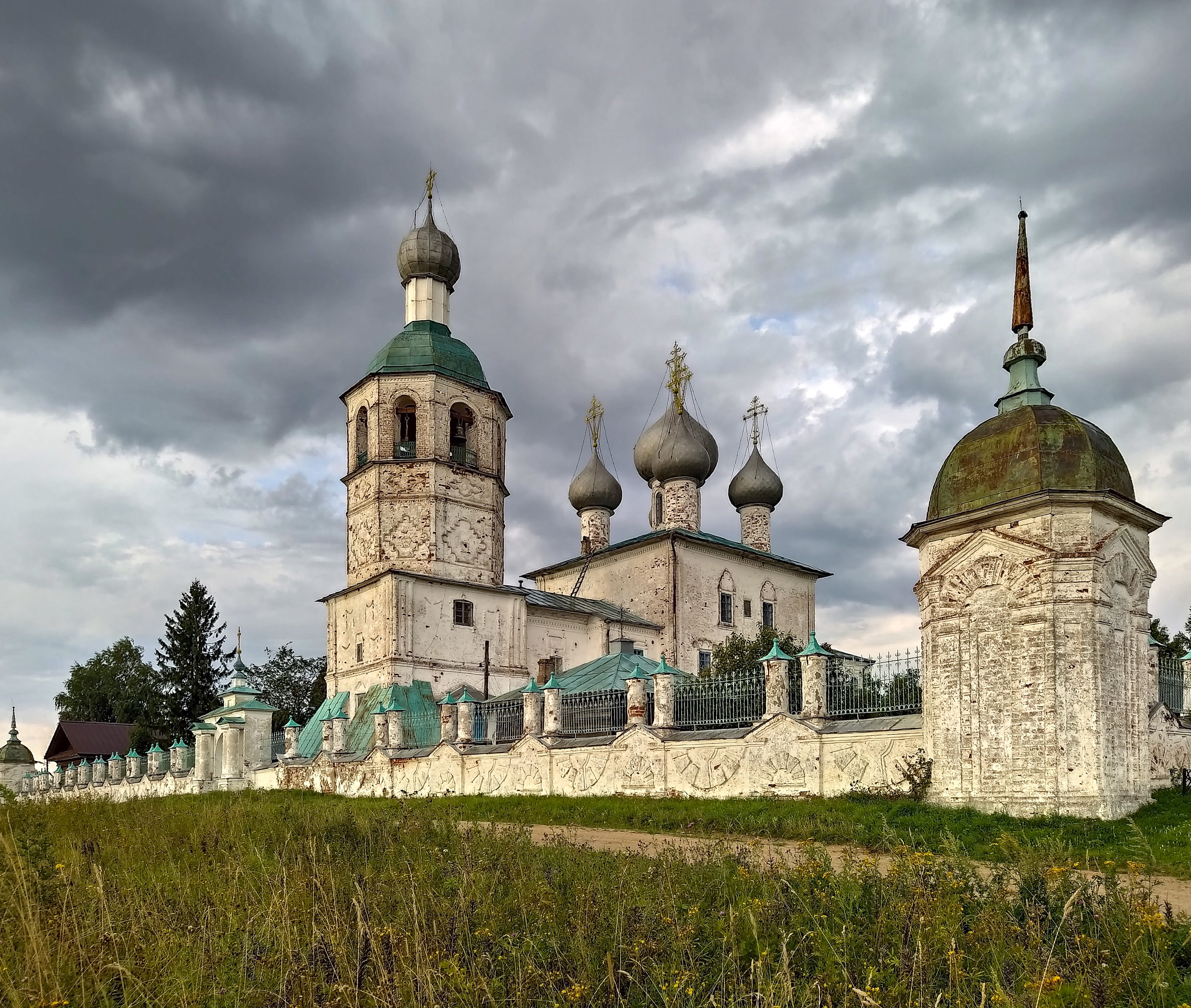
Church of St. Elijah: Ilyinskoye, Sokolsky District, Vologda Oblast

Pogost Ilyinsky (Russian: Погост Ильинский) is a rural locality (a selo) in Kadnikov, Sokolsky District, Vologda Oblast, Russia. The population was 3 as of 2002.

== Geography ==
The distance to Sokol is 16 km, to Kadnikov is 3 km. Tenkovo is the nearest rural locality.
