= Morzhenga =

Morzhenga Морженга
- Village
- Location within Vologda Oblast Location within Russia
- Coordinates: 59°37′N 40°11′E
- Country: Russia
- Region: Vologda Oblast
- District: Sokolsky District
- Time zone: UTC+3:00

Morzhenga (Russian: Морженга) is a rural locality (a village) in Nesterovskoye Rural Settlement, Sokolsky District, Vologda Oblast, Russia. The population was 137 as of 2002. There are 8 streets.

== Geography ==
Morzhenga is located 46 km north of Sokol (the district's administrative centre) by road. Zabolotye is the nearest rural locality.
