= Berezov Pochinok =

Berezov Pochinok Березов Починок
- Village
- Location within Vologda Oblast Location within Russia
- Coordinates: 59°23′N 40°39′E
- Country: Russia
- Region: Vologda Oblast
- District: Sokolsky District
- Time zone: UTC+3:00

Berezov Pochinok (Russian: Березов Починок) is a rural locality (a village) in Pelshemskoye Rural Settlement, Sokolsky District, Vologda Oblast, Russia. The population was 2 as of 2002.

== Geography ==
The distance to Sokol is 45 km, to Markovskoye is 10 km. Dikoye is the nearest rural locality.
