= Boriskovo =

Boriskovo Борисково
- Village
- Location within Vologda Oblast Location within Russia
- Coordinates: 59°26′N 40°11′E
- Country: Russia
- Region: Vologda Oblast
- District: Sokolsky District
- Time zone: UTC+3:00

Boriskovo (Russian: Борисково) is a rural locality (a village) in Prigorodnoye Rural Settlement, Sokolsky District, Vologda Oblast, Russia. The population was 17 as of 2002.

== Geography ==
Boriskovo is located 14 km southeast of Sokol (the district's administrative centre) by road. Vasyutino is the nearest rural locality.
