= Shchurikha =

Shchurikha Щуриха
- Village
- Location within Vologda Oblast Location within Russia
- Coordinates: 59°43′N 39°53′E
- Country: Russia
- Region: Vologda Oblast
- District: Sokolsky District
- Time zone: UTC+3:00

Shchurikha (Russian: Щуриха) is a rural locality (a village) in Nesterovskoye Rural Settlement, Sokolsky District, Vologda Oblast, Russia. The population was 2 as of 2002.

== Geography ==
Shchurikha is located 40 km northwest of Sokol (the district's administrative centre) by road. Sonikha is the nearest rural locality.
