= Kulseyevo =

Kulseyevo Кульсеево
- Village
- Location within Vologda Oblast Location within Russia
- Coordinates: 59°34′N 41°30′E
- Country: Russia
- Region: Vologda Oblast
- District: Sokolsky District
- Time zone: UTC+3:00

Kulseyevo (Russian: Кульсеево) is a rural locality (a village) in Biryakovskoye Rural Settlement, Sokolsky District, Vologda Oblast, Russia. The population was 9 as of 2002.

== Geography ==
Kulseyevo is located 105 km northeast of Sokol (the district's administrative centre) by road. Samylkovo is the nearest rural locality.
