= Bilnovo =

Bilnovo Бильново
- Village
- Location within Vologda Oblast Location within Russia
- Coordinates: 59°27′N 40°02′E
- Country: Russia
- Region: Vologda Oblast
- District: Sokolsky District
- Time zone: UTC+3:00

Bilnovo (Russian: Бильново) is a rural locality (a village) in Borovetskoye Rural Settlement, Sokolsky District, Vologda Oblast, Russia. The population was 27 as of 2002.

== Geography ==
Bilnovo is located 5 km northwest of Sokol (the district's administrative centre) by road. Bekrenevo is the nearest rural locality.
