= Gerasimovo, Sokolsky District, Vologda Oblast =

Gerasimovo Герасимово
- Village
- Location within Vologda Oblast Location within Russia
- Coordinates: 59°36′N 40°06′E
- Country: Russia
- Region: Vologda Oblast
- District: Sokolsky District
- Time zone: UTC+3:00

Gerasimovo (Russian: Герасимово) is a rural locality (a village) in Nesterovskoye Rural Settlement, Sokolsky District, Vologda Oblast, Russia. The population was 13 as of 2002.

== Geography ==
Gerasimovo is located 43 km north of Sokol (the district's administrative centre) by road. Bessolovo is the nearest rural locality.
