= Malye Ivanovskiye =

Malye Ivanovskiye Малые Ивановские
- Village
- Location within Vologda Oblast Location within Russia
- Coordinates: 59°36′N 40°55′E
- Country: Russia
- Region: Vologda Oblast
- District: Sokolsky District
- Time zone: UTC+3:00

Malye Ivanovskiye (Russian: Малые Ивановские) is a rural locality (a village) in Vorobyovskoye Rural Settlement, Sokolsky District, Vologda Oblast, Russia. The population was 21 as of 2002.

== Geography ==
The distance to Sokol is 59 km, to Vorobyovo is 3 km. Gorka is the nearest rural locality.
