= Staroye, Sokolsky District, Vologda Oblast =

Staroye Старое
- Village
- Location within Vologda Oblast Location within Russia
- Coordinates: 59°23′N 40°33′E
- Country: Russia
- Region: Vologda Oblast
- District: Sokolsky District
- Time zone: UTC+3:00

Staroye (Russian: Старое) is a rural locality (a village) in Pelshemskoye Rural Settlement, Sokolsky District, Vologda Oblast, Russia. The population was 2 as of 2002.

== Geography ==
The distance to Sokol is 40 km, to Markovskoye is 5 km. Popovskoye is the nearest rural locality.
