= Zhilino, Sokolsky District, Vologda Oblast =

Zhilino Жилино
- Village
- Location within Vologda Oblast Location within Russia
- Coordinates: 59°36′N 41°19′E
- Country: Russia
- Region: Vologda Oblast
- District: Sokolsky District
- Time zone: UTC+3:00

Zhilino (Russian: Жилино) is a rural locality (a village) in Chuchkovskoye Rural Settlement, Sokolsky District, Vologda Oblast, Russia. The population was 4 as of 2002.

== Geography ==
Zhilino is located 91 km northeast of Sokol (the district's administrative centre) by road. Pavlovo is the nearest rural locality.
