= Lubodino =

Lubodino Лубодино
- Village
- Location within Vologda Oblast Location within Russia
- Coordinates: 59°37′N 40°52′E
- Country: Russia
- Region: Vologda Oblast
- District: Sokolsky District
- Time zone: UTC+3:00

Lubodino (Russian: Лубодино) is a rural locality (a village) in Vorobyovskoye Rural Settlement, Sokolsky District, Vologda Oblast, Russia. The population was 22 as of 2002.

== Geography ==
Lubodino is located 64 km northeast of Sokol (the district's administrative centre) by road. Novoye is the nearest rural locality.
