= Litega =

Litega Литега
- Village
- Location within Vologda Oblast Location within Russia
- Coordinates: 59°25′N 40°13′E
- Country: Russia
- Region: Vologda Oblast
- District: Sokolsky District
- Time zone: UTC+3:00

Litega (Russian: Литега) is a rural locality (a village) and the administrative center of Prigorodnoye Rural Settlement, Sokolsky District, Vologda Oblast, Russia. The population was 797 as of 2002.

== Geography ==
Litega is located 13 km southeast of Sokol (the district's administrative centre) by road. Vasyutino is the nearest rural locality.
