= Gribtsovo =

Gribtsovo Грибцово
- Selo
- Location within Vologda Oblast Location within Russia
- Coordinates: 59°44′N 39°53′E
- Country: Russia
- Region: Vologda Oblast
- District: Sokolsky District
- Time zone: UTC+3:00

Gribtsovo (Russian: Грибцово) is a rural locality (a selo) in Nesterovskoye Rural Settlement, Sokolsky District, Vologda Oblast, Russia. The population was 54 as of 2002.

== Geography ==
Gribtsovo is located 40 km north of Sokol (the district's administrative centre) by road. Treparevo is the nearest rural locality.
