= Sosnovets, Vologda Oblast =

Sosnovets Сосновец
- Village
- Location within Vologda Oblast Location within Russia
- Coordinates: 59°34′N 40°06′E
- Country: Russia
- Region: Vologda Oblast
- District: Sokolsky District
- Time zone: UTC+3:00

Sosnovets (Russian: Сосновец) is a rural locality (a village) in Nesterovskoye Rural Settlement, Sokolsky District, Vologda Oblast, Russia. The population was 6 as of 2002.

== Geography ==
Sosnovets is located 45 km north of Sokol (the district's administrative centre) by road. Pustynya is the nearest rural locality.
