= Khaminovo =

Khaminovo Хаминово
- Village
- Location within Vologda Oblast Location within Russia
- Coordinates: 59°24′N 40°30′E
- Country: Russia
- Region: Vologda Oblast
- District: Sokolsky District
- Time zone: UTC+3:00

Khaminovo (Russian: Хаминово) is a rural locality (a village) in Pelshemskoye Rural Settlement, Sokolsky District, Vologda Oblast, Russia. The population was 2 as of 2002.

== Geography ==
Khaminovo is located 38 km southeast of Sokol (the district's administrative centre) by road. Tyrykovo is the nearest rural locality.
