= Podolnoye =

Podolnoye Подольное
- Village
- Location within Vologda Oblast Location within Russia
- Coordinates: 59°29′N 40°30′E
- Country: Russia
- Region: Vologda Oblast
- District: Sokolsky District
- Time zone: UTC+3:00

Podolnoye (Russian: Подольное) is a rural locality (a village) in Kadnikov, Sokolsky District, Vologda Oblast, Russia. The population was 87 as of 2002. There are 3 streets.

== Geography ==
Podolnoye is located 37 km northeast of Sokol (the district's administrative centre) by road. Yakovlevo is the nearest rural locality.
