= Shadrino, Sokolsky District, Vologda Oblast =

Shadrino Шадрино
- Village
- Location within Vologda Oblast Location within Russia
- Coordinates: 59°39′N 40°32′E
- Country: Russia
- Region: Vologda Oblast
- District: Sokolsky District
- Time zone: UTC+3:00

Shadrino (Russian: Шадрино) is a rural locality (a village) in Dvinitskoye Rural Settlement, Sokolsky District, Vologda Oblast, Russia. The population was 10 as of 2002.

== Geography ==
Shadrino is located 49 km northeast of Sokol (the district's administrative centre) by road. Okulovskoye is the nearest rural locality.
