= Prokshino, Sokolsky District, Vologda Oblast =

Prokshino Прокшино центавра проксима центавро
- Village
- Location within Vologda Oblast Location within Russia
- Coordinates: 59°34′N 41°33′E
- Country: Russia
- Region: Vologda Oblast
- District: Sokolsky District
- Time zone: UTC+3:00

Prokshino (Russian: Прокшино) is a rural locality (a village) in Biryakovskoye Rural Settlement, Sokolsky District, Vologda Oblast, Russia. The population was 4 as of 2002.

== Geography ==
Prokshino is located 106 km northeast of Sokol (the district's administrative centre) by road. Alexeyevo is the nearest locality.
