= Pykhmarevo =

Pykhmarevo Пыхмарево
- Village
- Location within Vologda Oblast Location within Russia
- Coordinates: 59°38′N 40°33′E
- Country: Russia
- Region: Vologda Oblast
- District: Sokolsky District
- Time zone: UTC+3:00

Pykhmarevo (Russian: Пыхмарево) is a rural locality (a village) in Dvinitskoye Rural Settlement, Sokolsky District, Vologda Oblast, Russia. The population was 12 as of 2002.

== Geography ==
Pykhmarevo is located 45 km northeast of Sokol (the district's administrative centre) by road. Osipovo is the nearest rural locality.
