= Telyachye, Sokolsky District, Vologda Oblast =

Telyachye Телячье
- Village
- Location within Vologda Oblast Location within Russia
- Coordinates: 59°30′N 40°33′E
- Country: Russia
- Region: Vologda Oblast
- District: Sokolsky District
- Time zone: UTC+3:00

Telyachye (Russian: Телячье) is a rural locality (a village) in Kadnikov, Sokolsky District, Vologda Oblast, Russia. The population was 12 as of 2002.

== Geography ==
Telyachye is located 42 km northeast of Sokol (the district's administrative centre) by road. Senino is the nearest rural locality.
