= Treparevo =

Treparevo Трепарево
- Village
- Location within Vologda Oblast Location within Russia
- Coordinates: 59°44′N 39°52′E
- Country: Russia
- Region: Vologda Oblast
- District: Sokolsky District
- Time zone: UTC+3:00

Treparevo (Russian: Трепарево) is a rural locality (a village) in Nesterovskoye Rural Settlement, Sokolsky District, Vologda Oblast, Russia. The population was 5 as of 2002.

== Geography ==
Treparevo is located 40 km northwest of Sokol (the district's administrative centre) by road. Gribtsovo is the nearest rural locality.
