= Shera, Vologda Oblast =

Shera Шера
- Village
- Location within Vologda Oblast Location within Russia
- Coordinates: 59°30′N 39°51′E
- Country: Russia
- Region: Vologda Oblast
- District: Sokolsky District
- Time zone: UTC+3:00

Shera (Russian: Шера) is a rural locality (a village) in Borovetskoye Rural Settlement, Sokolsky District, Vologda Oblast, Russia. The population was 71 as of 2002.

== Geography ==
Shera is located 48 km northwest of Sokol (the district's administrative centre) by road. Vlasyevo is the nearest rural locality.
