= Pyatino, Sokolsky District, Vologda Oblast =

Pyatino Пятино
- Village
- Location within Vologda Oblast Location within Russia
- Coordinates: 59°27′N 40°02′E
- Country: Russia
- Region: Vologda Oblast
- District: Sokolsky District
- Time zone: UTC+3:00

Pyatino (Russian: Пятино) is a rural locality (a village) in Borovetskoye Rural Settlement, Sokolsky District, Vologda Oblast, Russia. The population was 42 as of 2002.

== Geography ==
Pyatino is located 5 km west of Sokol (the district's administrative centre) by road. Rostovka is the nearest rural locality.
