= Vlasovo, Sokolsky District, Vologda Oblast =

Vlasovo Власово
- Village
- Location within Vologda Oblast Location within Russia
- Coordinates: 59°28′N 40°01′E
- Country: Russia
- Region: Vologda Oblast
- District: Sokolsky District
- Time zone: UTC+3:00

Vlasovo (Russian: Власово) is a rural locality (a village) in Borovetskoye Rural Settlement, Sokolsky District, Vologda Oblast, Russia. The population was 10 as of 2002.

== Geography ==
Vlasovo is located 9 km northwest of Sokol (the district's administrative centre) by road. Koshcheyevo is the nearest rural locality.
