= Tokhmarevo =

Tokhmarevo Тохмарево
- Village
- Location within Vologda Oblast Location within Russia
- Coordinates: 59°42′N 40°33′E
- Country: Russia
- Region: Vologda Oblast
- District: Sokolsky District
- Time zone: UTC+3:00

Tokhmarevo (Russian: Тохмарево) is a rural locality (a village) in Dvinitskoye Rural Settlement, Sokolsky District, Vologda Oblast, Russia. The population was 2 as of 2002.

== Geography ==
Tokhmarevo is located 53 km northeast of Sokol (the district's administrative centre) by road. Berkovo is the nearest rural locality.
