= Koposikha =

Koposikha Копосиха
- Village
- Location within Vologda Oblast Location within Russia
- Coordinates: 59°43′N 39°54′E
- Country: Russia
- Region: Vologda Oblast
- District: Sokolsky District
- Time zone: UTC+3:00

Koposikha (Russian: Копосиха) is a rural locality (a village) in Nesterovskoye Rural Settlement, Sokolsky District, Vologda Oblast, Russia. The population was 9 as of 2002.

== Geography ==
Koposikha is located 38 km north of Sokol (the district's administrative centre) by road. Spitsyno is the nearest rural locality.
