= Bolshoy Krivets =

Bolshoy Krivets Большой Кривец
- Village
- Location within Vologda Oblast Location within Russia
- Coordinates: 59°29′N 40°00′E
- Country: Russia
- Region: Vologda Oblast
- District: Sokolsky District
- Time zone: UTC+3:00

Bolshoy Krivets (Russian: Большой Кривец) is a rural locality (a village) in Borovetskoye Rural Settlement, Sokolsky District, Vologda Oblast, Russia. The population was 12 as of 2002.

== Geography ==
Bolshoy Krivets is located 8 km northwest of Sokol (the district's administrative centre) by road. Perevoz is the nearest rural locality.
