= Kalitino, Sokolsky District, Vologda Oblast =

Kalitino Калитино
- Village
- Location within Vologda Oblast Location within Russia
- Coordinates: 59°24′N 40°14′E
- Country: Russia
- Region: Vologda Oblast
- District: Sokolsky District
- Time zone: UTC+3:00

Kalitino (Russian: Калитино) is a rural locality (a village) in Prigorodnoye Rural Settlement, Sokolsky District, Vologda Oblast, Russia. The population was 5 as of 2002.

== Geography ==
Kalitino is located 15 km southeast of Sokol (the district's administrative centre) by road. Fedyukovo is the nearest rural locality.
