= Malye Goritsy =

Malye Goritsy Малые Горицы
- Village
- Location within Vologda Oblast Location within Russia
- Coordinates: 59°36′N 40°55′E
- Country: Russia
- Region: Vologda Oblast
- District: Sokolsky District
- Time zone: UTC+3:00

Malye Goritsy (Russian: Малые Горицы) is a rural locality (a village) in Vorobyovskoye Rural Settlement, Sokolsky District, Vologda Oblast, Russia. The population was 3 as of 2002.

== Geography ==
Malye Goritsy is located 69 km northeast of Sokol (the district's administrative centre) by road. Opalevo is the nearest rural locality.
