= Turovo, Sokolsky District, Vologda Oblast =

Turovo Турово
- Village
- Location within Vologda Oblast Location within Russia
- Coordinates: 59°27′N 40°26′E
- Country: Russia
- Region: Vologda Oblast
- District: Sokolsky District
- Time zone: UTC+3:00

Turovo (Russian: Турово) is a rural locality (a village) in Pelshemskoye Rural Settlement, Sokolsky District, Vologda Oblast, Russia. The population was 2 as of 2002.

== Geography ==
Turovo is located 31 km east of Sokol (the district's administrative centre) by road. Komarovo is the nearest rural locality.
