= Navalkino =

Navalkino Навалкино
- Village
- Location within Vologda Oblast Location within Russia
- Coordinates: 59°35′N 39°55′E
- Country: Russia
- Region: Vologda Oblast
- District: Sokolsky District
- Time zone: UTC+3:00

Navalkino (Russian: Навалкино) is a rural locality (a village) in Arkhangelskoye Rural Settlement, Sokolsky District, Vologda Oblast, Russia. The population was 2 as of 2002.

== Geography ==
Navalkino is located 24 km northwest of Sokol (the district's administrative centre) by road. Svetlikovo is the nearest rural locality.
