= Yesipovo, Sokolsky District, Vologda Oblast =

Yesipovo Есипово
- Village
- Location within Vologda Oblast Location within Russia
- Coordinates: 59°27′N 40°03′E
- Country: Russia
- Region: Vologda Oblast
- District: Sokolsky District
- Time zone: UTC+3:00

Yesipovo (Russian: Есипово) is a rural locality (a village) in Borovetskoye Rural Settlement, Sokolsky District, Vologda Oblast, Russia. The population was 25 as of 2002.

== Geography ==
Yesipovo is located 4 km southwest of Sokol (the district's administrative centre) by road. Fokino is the nearest rural locality.
