= Levkovo, Sokolsky District, Vologda Oblast =

Levkovo Левково
- Village
- Location within Vologda Oblast Location within Russia
- Coordinates: 59°41′N 40°00′E
- Country: Russia
- Region: Vologda Oblast
- District: Sokolsky District
- Time zone: UTC+3:00

Levkovo (Russian: Левково) is a rural locality (a village) in Nesterovskoye Rural Settlement, Sokolsky District, Vologda Oblast, Russia. The population was 1 as of 2002.

== Geography ==
Levkovo is located 33 km north of Sokol (the district's administrative centre) by road. Mikhalevo is the nearest rural locality.
