= Lodeyshchik =

Lodeyshchik Лодейщик
- Village
- Location within Vologda Oblast Location within Russia
- Coordinates: 59°22′N 40°41′E
- Country: Russia
- Region: Vologda Oblast
- District: Sokolsky District
- Time zone: UTC+3:00

Lodeyshchik (Russian: Лодейщик) is a rural locality (a village) in Pelshemskoye Rural Settlement, Sokolsky District, Vologda Oblast, Russia. The population was 1 as of 2002.

== Geography ==
Lodeyshchik is located 50 km southeast of Sokol (the district's administrative centre) by road. Nizhnyaya Storona is the nearest rural locality.
