= Popovo, Sokolsky District, Vologda Oblast =

Popovo Попово
- Village
- Location within Vologda Oblast Location within Russia
- Coordinates: 59°33′N 41°27′E
- Country: Russia
- Region: Vologda Oblast
- District: Sokolsky District
- Time zone: UTC+3:00

Popovo (Russian: Попово) is a rural locality (a village) in Biryakovskoye Rural Settlement, Sokolsky District, Vologda Oblast, Russia. The population was 2 as of 2002.

== Geography ==
Popovo is located 105 km northeast of Sokol (the district's administrative centre) by road. Spasskoye is the nearest rural locality.
