= Panyutino =

Panyutino Панютино
- Village
- Location within Vologda Oblast Location within Russia
- Coordinates: 59°42′N 39°58′E
- Country: Russia
- Region: Vologda Oblast
- District: Sokolsky District
- Time zone: UTC+3:00

Panyutino (Russian: Панютино) is a rural locality (a village) in Nesterovskoye Rural Settlement, Sokolsky District, Vologda Oblast, Russia. The population was 2 as of 2002.

== Geography ==
Panyutino is located 35 km north of Sokol (the district's administrative centre) by road. Marfinskoye is the nearest rural locality.
