= Myalitsyno =

Myalitsyno Мялицыно
- Village
- Location within Vologda Oblast Location within Russia
- Coordinates: 59°41′N 39°57′E
- Country: Russia
- Region: Vologda Oblast
- District: Sokolsky District
- Time zone: UTC+3:00

Myalitsyno (Russian: Мялицыно) is a rural locality (a village) in Nesterovskoye Rural Settlement, Sokolsky District, Vologda Oblast, Russia. The population was 11 as of 2002.

== Geography ==
Myalitsyno is located 33 km north of Sokol (the district's administrative centre) by road. Nesterovo is the nearest rural locality.
