= Yakovlevo, Sokolsky District, Vologda Oblast =

Yakovlevo Яковлево
- Village
- Location within Vologda Oblast Location within Russia
- Coordinates: 59°29′N 40°33′E
- Country: Russia
- Region: Vologda Oblast
- District: Sokolsky District
- Time zone: UTC+3:00

Yakovlevo (Russian: Яковлево) is a rural locality (a village) in Kadnikov, Sokolsky District, Vologda Oblast, Russia. The population was 11 as of 2002.

== Geography ==
Yakovlevo is located 42 km east of Sokol (the district's administrative centre) by road. Zamoshye is the nearest rural locality.
