= Tenkovo, Vologda Oblast =

Tenkovo Теньково
- Village
- Location within Vologda Oblast Location within Russia
- Coordinates: 59°31′N 40°18′E
- Country: Russia
- Region: Vologda Oblast
- District: Sokolsky District
- Time zone: UTC+3:00

Tenkovo (Russian: Теньково) is a rural locality (a village) in Kadnikov, Sokolsky District, Vologda Oblast, Russia. The population was 3 as of 2002.

== Geography ==
Tenkovo is located 29 km northeast of Sokol (the district's administrative centre) by road. Bolshoye Selo is the nearest rural locality.
