= Ostrilovo =

Ostrilovo Острилово
- Village
- Location within Vologda Oblast Location within Russia
- Coordinates: 59°42′N 39°56′E
- Country: Russia
- Region: Vologda Oblast
- District: Sokolsky District
- Time zone: UTC+3:00

Ostrilovo (Russian: Острилово) is a rural locality (a village) in Nesterovskoye Rural Settlement, Sokolsky District, Vologda Oblast, Russia. The population was 3 as of 2002.

== Geography ==
Ostrilovo is located 35 km northwest of Sokol (the district's administrative centre) by road. Afanasovo is the nearest rural locality.
