= Shulepovo =

Shulepovo Шулепово
- Village
- Location within Vologda Oblast Location within Russia
- Coordinates: 59°47′N 39°59′E
- Country: Russia
- Region: Vologda Oblast
- District: Sokolsky District
- Time zone: UTC+3:00

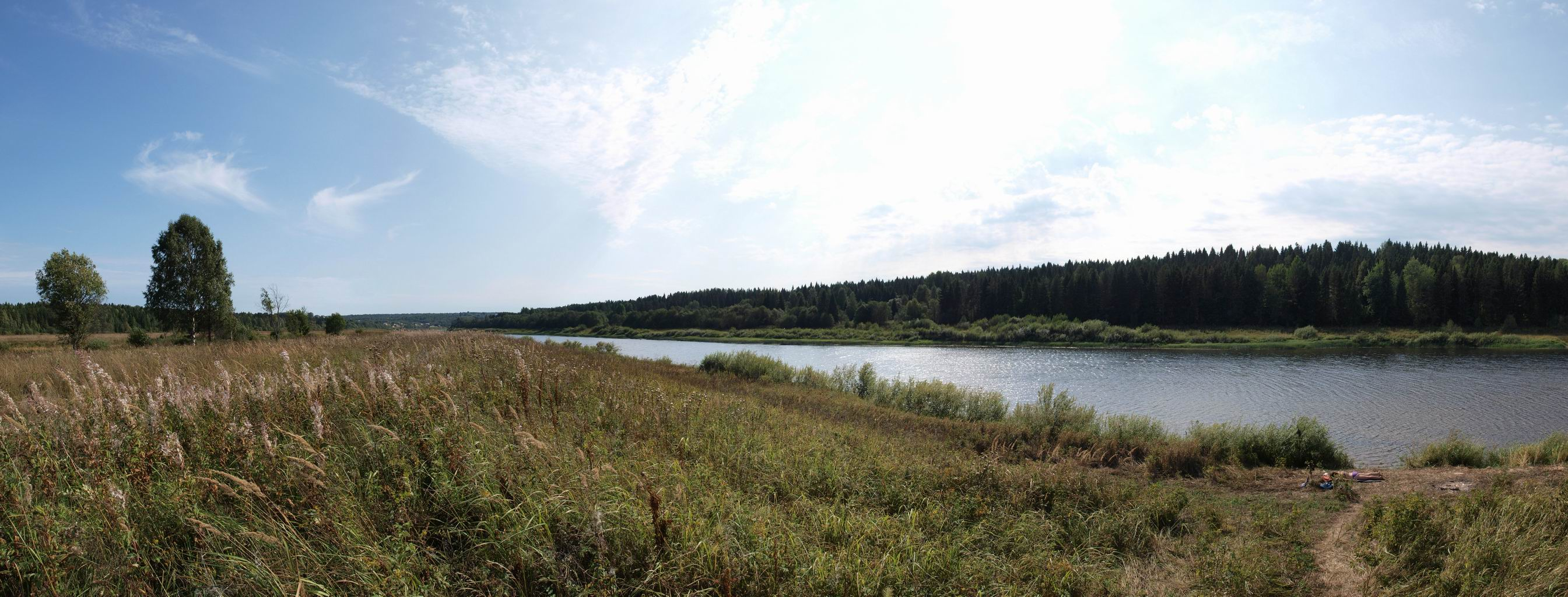
Shulepovo

Shulepovo (Russian: Шулепово) is a rural locality (a village) in Nesterovskoye Rural Settlement, Sokolsky District, Vologda Oblast, Russia. The population was 9 as of 2002.

== Geography ==
Shulepovo is located 47 km northwest of Sokol (the district's administrative centre) by road. Istominskoye is the nearest rural locality.
