= Preobrazhenskoye, Vologda Oblast =

Preobrazhenskoye Преображенское
- Village
- Location within Vologda Oblast Location within Russia
- Coordinates: 59°38′N 40°54′E
- Country: Russia
- Region: Vologda Oblast
- District: Sokolsky District
- Time zone: UTC+3:00

Preobrazhenskoye (Russian: Преображенское) is a rural locality (a village) in Vorobyovskoye Rural Settlement, Sokolsky District, Vologda Oblast, Russia. The population was 12 as of 2002.

== Geography ==
Preobrazhenskoye is located 67 km northeast of Sokol (the district's administrative centre) by road. Vitoryevo is the nearest rural locality.
