= Filyayevo, Sokolsky District, Vologda Oblast =

Filyayevo Филяево
- Village
- Location within Vologda Oblast Location within Russia
- Coordinates: 59°29′N 40°21′E
- Country: Russia
- Region: Vologda Oblast
- District: Sokolsky District
- Time zone: UTC+3:00

Filyayevo (Russian: Филяево) is a rural locality (a village) in Kadnikov, Sokolsky District, Vologda Oblast, Russia. The population was 29 as of 2002.

== Geography ==
By road, Filyayevo is located 25 km northeast of Sokol, the district's administrative centre. Kadnikov is the nearest rural locality.
