= Maly Krivets =

Maly Krivets Малый Кривец
- Village
- Location within Vologda Oblast Location within Russia
- Coordinates: 59°29′N 40°00′E
- Country: Russia
- Region: Vologda Oblast
- District: Sokolsky District
- Time zone: UTC+3:00

Maly Krivets (Russian: Малый Кривец) is a rural locality (a village) in Borovetskoye Rural Settlement, Sokolsky District, Vologda Oblast, Russia. The population was 16 as of 2002.

== Geography ==
Maly Krivets is located 12 km northwest of Sokol (the district's administrative centre) by road. Shishkino is the nearest rural locality.
