= Plishkino, Vologda Oblast =

Plishkino Плишкино
- Village
- Location within Vologda Oblast Location within Russia
- Coordinates: 59°30′N 39°55′E
- Country: Russia
- Region: Vologda Oblast
- District: Sokolsky District
- Time zone: UTC+3:00

Plishkino (Russian: Плишкино) is a rural locality (a village) in Borovetskoye Rural Settlement, Sokolsky District, Vologda Oblast, Russia. The population was two as of 2002.

== Geography ==
Plishkino is located 16 km northwest of Sokol (the district's administrative centre) by road. Pochinok is the nearest rural locality.
