= Berezino, Vologda Oblast =

Berezino Березино
- Village
- Location within Vologda Oblast Location within Russia
- Coordinates: 59°36′N 41°04′E
- Country: Russia
- Region: Vologda Oblast
- District: Sokolsky District
- Time zone: UTC+3:00

Berezino (Russian: Березино) is a rural locality (a village) in Chuchkovskoye Rural Settlement, Sokolsky District, Vologda Oblast, Russia. The population was 2 as of 2002.

== Geography ==
Berezino is located 76 km northeast of Sokol (the district's administrative centre) by road. Tretyakovo is the nearest rural locality.
