= Semakino =

Semakino Семакино
- Village
- Location within Vologda Oblast Location within Russia
- Coordinates: 59°36′N 40°50′E
- Country: Russia
- Region: Vologda Oblast
- District: Sokolsky District
- Time zone: UTC+3:00

Semakino (Russian: Семакино) is a rural locality (a village) in Vorobyovskoye Rural Settlement, Sokolsky District, Vologda Oblast, Russia. The population was 5 as of 2002.

== Geography ==
Semakino is located 70 km northeast of Sokol (the district's administrative centre) by road. Georgiyevskoye is the nearest rural locality.
