= Kadnikov =

Town in Vologda Oblast, Russia

Kadnikov Кадников
- Town
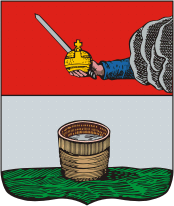
- Coat of arms
- Interactive map of Kadnikov
- Location of Kadnikov Kadnikov (Vologda Oblast)
- Coordinates: 59°30′N 40°20′E
- Country: Russia
- Federal subject: Vologda Oblast
- Administrative district: Sokolsky District
- Town of district significanceSelsoviet: Kadnikov
- First mentioned: 1492
- Town status since: 1780
- Elevation: 140 m (460 ft)

Population (2010 Census)
  - Total: 4,796
  - Estimate (2023): 4,022 (−16.1%)

Administrative status
  - Capital of: town of district significance of Kadnikov

Municipal status
  - Municipal district: Sokolsky Municipal District
  - Urban settlement: Kadnikov Urban Settlement
  - Capital of: Kadnikov Urban Settlement
- Time zone: UTC+3 (MSK)
- Postal code: 162107
- OKTMO ID: 19638104001

Kadnikov (Russian: Ка́дников) is a town in Sokolsky District of Vologda Oblast, Russia, located on the bank of the Sodima River, 43 kilometers (27 mi) southeast of Vologda, the administrative center of the oblast. Population: 4,796 (2010 census); 5,362 (2002 census); 5,312 (1989 Soviet census).

== History ==
It traces its history to 1492, when a patrol station was set up to protect the trade route heading from Moscow northward. In 1780, it became the seat of Kadnikovsky Uyezd of Vologda Viceroyalty (since 1796—Vologda Governorate) and was granted town status. The uyezd, one of the ten in the governorate, comprised vast areas in the central part of modern Vologda Oblast east and northeast of Lake Kubenskoye, as well as the south of modern Arkhangelsk Oblast. However, when a railway was constructed in 1894 from Vologda north to Arkhangelsk, the route bypassed Kadnikov. In the 20th century, the population of Kadnikov declined while that of neighboring Sokol, which is located 12 kilometers (7.5 mi) to the northwest, has grown, and Kadnikov lost its significance as the administrative center. When the uyezds were abolished on July 15, 1929, Kadnikov was included into Sverdlovsky District (later renamed Sokolsky District) of Northern Krai.

== Administrative and municipal status ==
Within the framework of administrative divisions, it is incorporated within Sokolsky District as the town of district significance of Kadnikov. As a municipal division, the town of district significance of Kadnikov, together with Kadnikovsky and Zamoshsky Selsoviets of Sokolsky District (which comprise, correspondingly, twenty-two and eighteen rural localities, for the total of forty rural localities), is incorporated within Sokolsky Municipal District as Kadnikov Urban Settlement.

== Economy ==
=== Industry ===
There are timber industry and food industry enterprises in Kadnikov.

=== Transportation ===
One of the principal highways in Russia, M8, which connects Moscow and Arkhangelsk, crosses Sokolsky District running through the center of Kadnikov. Several kilometers northwest from Kadnikov, in Chekshino, another highway branches off east and runs to Totma and Veliky Ustyug. It provides the shortest connection between Vologda and the destinations in the eastern districts of Vologda Oblast, in particular, Nikolsk, Nyuksenitsa, and Kichmengsky Gorodok.

== Culture and recreation ==
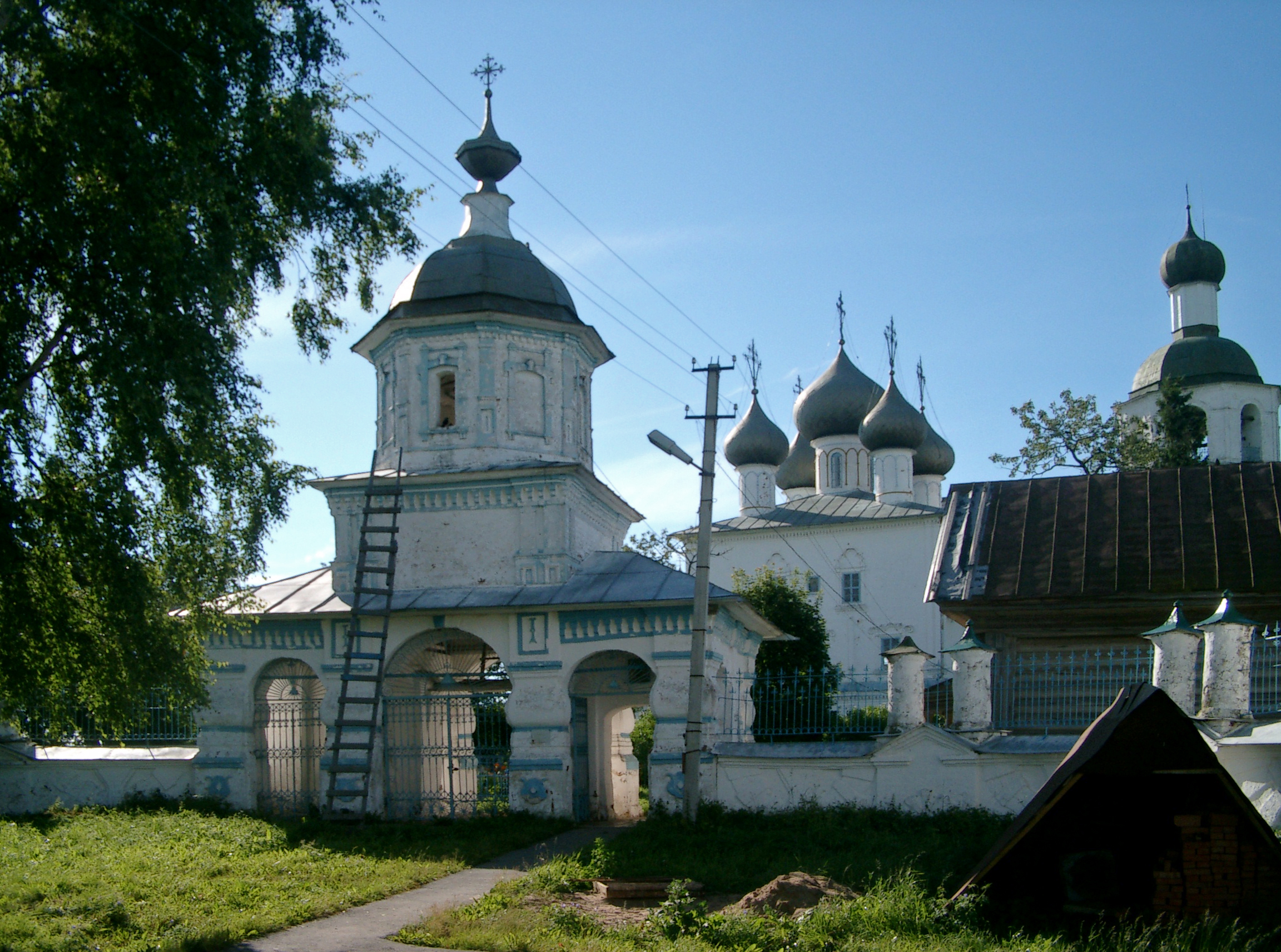
Ilyinsky Pogost

A historical interest attaches to Ilyinsky pogost, comprising a 17th-century five-domed church, a belfry, and a fenced burial ground. This complex is located several miles away from the town and is designated as a cultural heritage monuments of federal significance. The center of Kadnikov preserved a collection of historical buildings, thirty-five of which are designated as cultural and historical heritage of local significance.

The Kadnikov Museum of History was opened in 1985 and is located in one of the historical buildings in the center of Kadnikov.
