= Perkhurovo =

Perkhurovo Перхурово
- Village
- Location within Vologda Oblast Location within Russia
- Coordinates: 59°27′N 40°34′E
- Country: Russia
- Region: Vologda Oblast
- District: Sokolsky District
- Time zone: UTC+3:00

Perkhurovo (Russian: Перхурово) is a rural locality (a village) in Kadnikov, Sokolsky District, Vologda Oblast, Russia. The population was 3 as of 2002.

== Geography ==
Perkhurovo is located 44 km east of Sokol (the district's administrative centre) by road. Bratskoye is the nearest rural locality.
