= Shiblovka =

Shiblovka Шибловка
- Village
- Location within Vologda Oblast Location within Russia
- Coordinates: 59°35′N 41°31′E
- Country: Russia
- Region: Vologda Oblast
- District: Sokolsky District
- Time zone: UTC+3:00

Shiblovka (Russian: Шибловка) is a rural locality (a village) in Biryakovskoye Rural Settlement, Sokolsky District, Vologda Oblast, Russia. The population was 10 as of 2002.

== Geography ==
Shiblovka is located 104 km northeast of Sokol (the district's administrative centre) by road. Biryakovo is the nearest rural locality.
