= Podyelnoye =

Podyelnoye Подъельное
- Village
- Location within Vologda Oblast Location within Russia
- Coordinates: 59°28′N 40°22′E
- Country: Russia
- Region: Vologda Oblast
- District: Sokolsky District
- Time zone: UTC+3:00

Podyelnoye (Russian: Подъельное) is a rural locality (a village) in Kadnikov, Sokolsky District, Vologda Oblast, Russia. The population was 16 as of 2002.

== Geography ==
Podyelnoye is located 27 km northeast of Sokol (the district's administrative centre) by road. Yerdenovo is the nearest rural locality.
