= Lipovitsa =

Lipovitsa Липовица
- Village
- Location within Vologda Oblast Location within Russia
- Coordinates: 59°33′N 41°17′E
- Country: Russia
- Region: Vologda Oblast
- District: Sokolsky District
- Time zone: UTC+3:00

Lipovitsa (Russian: Липовица) is a rural locality (a village) in Chuchkovskoye Rural Settlement, Sokolsky District, Vologda Oblast, Russia. The population was 13 as of 2002.

== Geography ==
Lipovitsa is located 95 km northeast of Sokol (the district's administrative centre) by road. Vysokaya is the nearest rural locality.
