= Pakhino =

Pakhino Пахино
- Village
- Location within Vologda Oblast Location within Russia
- Coordinates: 59°46′N 39°57′E
- Country: Russia
- Region: Vologda Oblast
- District: Sokolsky District
- Time zone: UTC+3:00

Pakhino (Russian: Пахино) is a rural locality (a village) in Nesterovskoye Rural Settlement, Sokolsky District, Vologda Oblast, Russia. The population was 4 as of 2002.

== Geography ==
Pakhino is located 43 km north of Sokol (the district's administrative centre) by road. Lebechikha is the nearest rural locality.
