= Tolstoumovo =

Tolstoumovo Толстоумово
- Village
- Location within Vologda Oblast Location within Russia
- Coordinates: 59°38′N 40°54′E
- Country: Russia
- Region: Vologda Oblast
- District: Sokolsky District
- Time zone: UTC+3:00

Tolstoumovo (Russian: Толстоумово) is a rural locality (a village) in Vorobyovskoye Rural Settlement, Sokolsky District, Vologda Oblast, Russia. The population was 8 as of 2002.

== Geography ==
Tolstoumovo is located 66 km northeast of Sokol (the district's administrative centre) by road. Molodenovo is the nearest rural locality.
