= Spitsyno, Sokolsky District, Vologda Oblast =

Spitsyno Спицыно
- Village
- Location within Vologda Oblast Location within Russia
- Coordinates: 59°43′N 39°54′E
- Country: Russia
- Region: Vologda Oblast
- District: Sokolsky District
- Time zone: UTC+3:00

Spitsyno (Russian: Спицыно) is a rural locality (a village) in Nesterovskoye Rural Settlement, Sokolsky District, Vologda Oblast, Russia. The population was 2 as of 2002.

== Geography ==
Spitsyno is located 38 km northwest of Sokol (the district's administrative centre) by road. Koposikha is the nearest rural locality.
