= Guriyevo =

Guriyevo Гуриево
- Village
- Location within Vologda Oblast Location within Russia
- Coordinates: 59°29′N 39°57′E
- Country: Russia
- Region: Vologda Oblast
- District: Sokolsky District
- Time zone: UTC+3:00

Guriyevo (Russian: Гуриево) is a rural locality (a village) in Borovetskoye Rural Settlement, Sokolsky District, Vologda Oblast, Russia. The population was 5 as of 2002.

== Geography ==
Guriyevo is located 12 km northwest of Sokol (the district's administrative centre) by road. Turbayevo is the nearest rural locality.
