= Melino =

Melino Мелино
- Village
- Nickname: Melanis
- Location within Vologda Oblast Location within Russia
- Coordinates: 59°38′N 41°15′E
- Country: Russia
- Region: Vologda Oblast
- District: Sokolsky District
- Time zone: UTC+3:00

Melino (Russian: Мелино) is a rural locality (a village) in Chuchkovskoye Rural Settlement, Sokolsky District, Vologda Oblast, Russia. The population was 4 as of 2002.

== Geography ==
Melino is located 91 km northeast of Sokol (the district's administrative centre) by road. Pogrebnoye is the nearest rural locality.

== Name origin ==
Melino is also a name. The name, Melino originated from East Asia and South Europe. The name, Melino also originated from the greek name Melanis
