= Kalinovo, Vologda Oblast =

Kalinovo Калиново
- Village
- Location within Vologda Oblast Location within Russia
- Coordinates: 59°30′N 39°53′E
- Country: Russia
- Region: Vologda Oblast
- District: Sokolsky District
- Time zone: UTC+3:00

Kalinovo (Russian: Калиново) is a rural locality (a village) in Borovetskoye Rural Settlement, Sokolsky District, Vologda Oblast, Russia. The population was 17 as of 2002.

== Geography ==
Kalinovo is located 18 km northwest of Sokol (the district's administrative centre) by road. Ofimkino is the nearest rural locality.
