= Olarevo =

Olarevo Оларево
- Village
- Location within Vologda Oblast Location within Russia
- Coordinates: 59°21′N 40°04′E
- Country: Russia
- Region: Vologda Oblast
- District: Sokolsky District
- Time zone: UTC+3:00

Olarevo (Russian: Оларево) is a rural locality (a village) in Prigorodnoye Rural Settlement, Sokolsky District, Vologda Oblast, Russia. The population was 226 as of 2002.

== Geography ==
Olarevo is located 16 km southwest of Sokol (the district's administrative centre) by road. Severovo is the nearest rural locality.
