= Zakurskoye =

Zakurskoye Закурское
- Village
- Location within Vologda Oblast Location within Russia
- Coordinates: 59°36′N 41°06′E
- Country: Russia
- Region: Vologda Oblast
- District: Sokolsky District
- Time zone: UTC+3:00

Zakurskoye (Russian: Закурское) is a rural locality (a village) in Chuchkovskoye Rural Settlement, Sokolsky District, Vologda Oblast, Russia. The population was 80 as of 2002.

== Geography ==
Zakurskoye is located 83 km northeast of Sokol (the district's administrative centre) by road. Klokovo is the nearest rural locality.
