= Kuvayevo =

Kuvayevo Куваево
- Village
- Location within Vologda Oblast Location within Russia
- Coordinates: 59°36′N 40°54′E
- Country: Russia
- Region: Vologda Oblast
- District: Sokolsky District
- Time zone: UTC+3:00

Kuvayevo (Russian: Куваево) is a rural locality (a village) in Vorobyovskoye Rural Settlement, Sokolsky District, Vologda Oblast, Russia. The population was 1 as of 2002.

== Geography ==
Kuvayevo is located 68 km northeast of Sokol (the district's administrative centre) by road. Shchekotovo is the nearest rural locality.
