= Boyarskoye, Sokolsky District, Vologda Oblast =

Boyarskoye Боярское
- Village
- Location within Vologda Oblast Location within Russia
- Coordinates: 59°37′N 41°02′E
- Country: Russia
- Region: Vologda Oblast
- District: Sokolsky District
- Time zone: UTC+3:00

Boyarskoye (Russian: Боярское) is a rural locality (a village) in Chuchkovskoye Rural Settlement, Sokolsky District, Vologda Oblast, Russia. The population was 15 as of 2002.

== Geography ==
Boyarskoye is located 74 km northeast of Sokol (the district's administrative centre) by road. Prudovka is the nearest rural locality.
