= Yadrovo =

Yadrovo Ядрово
- Village
- Location within Vologda Oblast Location within Russia
- Coordinates: 59°40′N 40°53′E
- Country: Russia
- Region: Vologda Oblast
- District: Sokolsky District
- Time zone: UTC+3:00

Yadrovo (Russian: Ядрово) is a rural locality (a village) in Vorobyovskoye Rural Settlement, Sokolsky District, Vologda Oblast, Russia. The population was 4 as of 2002.

== Geography ==
Yadrovo is located 70 km northeast of Sokol (the district's administrative centre) by road. Aleksino is the nearest rural locality.
