= Istominskoye =

Istominskoye Истоминское
- Village
- Location within Vologda Oblast Location within Russia
- Coordinates: 59°46′N 39°58′E
- Country: Russia
- Region: Vologda Oblast
- District: Sokolsky District
- Time zone: UTC+3:00

Istominskoye (Russian: Истоминское) is a rural locality (a village) in Nesterovskoye Rural Settlement, Sokolsky District, Vologda Oblast, Russia. The population was 5 as of 2002.

== Geography ==
Istominskoye is located 46 km north of Sokol (the district's administrative centre) by road. Zaledeyevo is the nearest rural locality.
