= Kaznakuryevo =

Kaznakuryevo Казнакурьево
- Village
- Location within Vologda Oblast Location within Russia
- Coordinates: 59°40′N 40°25′E
- Country: Russia
- Region: Vologda Oblast
- District: Sokolsky District
- Time zone: UTC+3:00

Kaznakuryevo (Russian: Казнакурьево) is a rural locality (a village) in Dvinitskoye Rural Settlement, Sokolsky District, Vologda Oblast, Russia. The population was 7 as of 2002.

== Geography ==
Kaznakuryevo is located 56 km northeast of Sokol (the district's administrative centre) by road. Yushkovo is the nearest rural locality.
