= Alferovskoye =

Alferovskoye Алферовское
- Settlement
- Location within Vologda Oblast Location within Russia
- Coordinates: 59°26′N 40°27′E
- Country: Russia
- Region: Vologda Oblast
- District: Sokolsky District
- Time zone: UTC+3:00

Alferovskoye (Russian: Алферовское) is a rural locality (a settlement) in Pelshemskoye Rural Settlement, Sokolsky District, Vologda Oblast, Russia. The population was 11 as of 2002.

== Geography ==
Alferovskoye is located 34 km southeast of Sokol (the district's administrative centre) by road. Markovskoye is the nearest rural locality.
