= Alekino =

Alekino Алекино
- Village
- Location within Vologda Oblast Location within Russia
- Coordinates: 59°34′N 41°25′E
- Country: Russia
- Region: Vologda Oblast
- District: Sokolsky District
- Time zone: UTC+3:00

Alekino (Russian: Алекино) is a rural locality (a village) in Biryakovskoye Rural Settlement, Sokolsky District, Vologda Oblast, Russia. The population was 3 as of 2002.

== Geography ==
Alekino is located 98 km northeast of Sokol (the district's administrative centre) by road. Semenovo is the nearest rural locality.
