= Rogozkino, Sokolsky District, Vologda Oblast =

Rogozkino Рогозкино
- Village
- Location within Vologda Oblast Location within Russia
- Coordinates: 59°36′N 40°56′E
- Country: Russia
- Region: Vologda Oblast
- District: Sokolsky District
- Time zone: UTC+3:00

Rogozkino (Russian: Рогозкино) is a rural locality (a village) in Vorobyovskoye Rural Settlement, Sokolsky District, Vologda Oblast, Russia. The population was 4 as of 2002.

== Geography ==
Rogozkino is located 69 km (43 mi) northeast of Sokol (the district's administrative centre) by road. Dyurbenikha is the nearest rural locality.
