= Slobodishchevo =

Slobodishchevo Слободищево
- Village
- Location within Vologda Oblast Location within Russia
- Coordinates: 59°35′N 41°13′E
- Country: Russia
- Region: Vologda Oblast
- District: Sokolsky District
- Time zone: UTC+3:00

Slobodishchevo (Russian: Слободищево) is a rural locality (a village) in Chuchkovskoye Rural Settlement, Sokolsky District, Vologda Oblast, Russia. The population was 21 as of 2002.

== Geography ==
Slobodishchevo is located 87 km northeast of Sokol (the district's administrative centre) by road. Gorbovo is the nearest rural locality.
