= Kamskoye =

Kamskoye Камское
- Village
- Location within Vologda Oblast Location within Russia
- Coordinates: 59°25′N 40°03′E
- Country: Russia
- Region: Vologda Oblast
- District: Sokolsky District
- Time zone: UTC+3:00

Kamskoye (Russian: Камское) is a rural locality (a village) in Borovetskoye Rural Settlement, Sokolsky District, Vologda Oblast, Russia. The population was 4 as of 2002.

== Geography ==
Kamskoye is located 12 km southwest of Sokol (the district's administrative centre) by road. Shastovo-Zabereznoye is the nearest rural locality.
