= Pepelnikovo =

Pepelnikovo Пепельниково
- Village
- Location within Vologda Oblast Location within Russia
- Coordinates: 59°37′N 41°19′E
- Country: Russia
- Region: Vologda Oblast
- District: Sokolsky District
- Time zone: UTC+3:00

Pepelnikovo (Russian: Пепельниково) is a rural locality (a village) in Chuchkovskoye Rural Settlement, Sokolsky District, Vologda Oblast, Russia. The population was 6 as of 2002.

== Geography ==
Pepelnikovo is located 92 km northeast of Sokol (the district's administrative centre) by road. Nikolskoye is the nearest rural locality.
