= Bryukhovo, Sokolsky District, Vologda Oblast =

Bryukhovo Брюхово
- Village
- Location within Vologda Oblast Location within Russia
- Coordinates: 59°36′N 41°33′E
- Country: Russia
- Region: Vologda Oblast
- District: Sokolsky District
- Time zone: UTC+3:00

Bryukhovo (Russian: Брюхово) is a rural locality (a village) in Biryakovskoye Rural Settlement, Sokolsky District, Vologda Oblast, Russia. The population was 8 as of 2002.

== Geography ==
Bryukhovo is located 105 km northeast of Sokol (the district's administrative centre) by road. Zabolotye is the nearest rural locality.
