= Kromovesovo =

Kromovesovo Кромовесово
- Village
- Location within Vologda Oblast Location within Russia
- Coordinates: 59°28′N 39°59′E
- Country: Russia
- Region: Vologda Oblast
- District: Sokolsky District
- Time zone: UTC+3:00

Kromovesovo (Russian: Кромовесово) is a rural locality (a village) in Borovetskoye Rural Settlement, Sokolsky District, Vologda Oblast, Russia. The population was 8 as of 2002.

== Geography ==
Kromovesovo is located 9 km northwest of Sokol (the district's administrative centre) by road. Obrosovo is the nearest rural locality.
