= Rodyukino, Sokolsky District, Vologda Oblast =

Rodyukino Родюкино
- Village
- Location within Vologda Oblast Location within Russia
- Coordinates: 59°26′N 40°02′E
- Country: Russia
- Region: Vologda Oblast
- District: Sokolsky District
- Time zone: UTC+3:00

Rodyukino (Russian: Родюкино) is a rural locality (a village) in Borovetskoye Rural Settlement, Sokolsky District, Vologda Oblast, Russia. The population was 1 as of 2002.

== Geography ==
Rodyukino is located 10 km southwest of Sokol (the district's administrative centre) by road. Pomelnikovo is the nearest rural locality.
