= Lendobovo =

Lendobovo Лендобово
- Village
- Location within Vologda Oblast Location within Russia
- Coordinates: 59°30′N 39°56′E
- Country: Russia
- Region: Vologda Oblast
- District: Sokolsky District
- Time zone: UTC+3:00

Lendobovo (Russian: Лендобово) is a rural locality (a village) in Borovetskoye Rural Settlement, Sokolsky District, Vologda Oblast, Russia. The population was 8 as of 2002.

== Geography ==
Lendobovo is located 15 km northwest of Sokol (the district's administrative centre) by road. Pochinok is the nearest rural locality.
