= Skomorokhovo, Sokolsky District, Vologda Oblast =

Skomorokhovo Скоморохово
- Village
- Location within Vologda Oblast Location within Russia
- Coordinates: 59°35′N 41°13′E
- Country: Russia
- Region: Vologda Oblast
- District: Sokolsky District
- Time zone: UTC+3:00

Skomorokhovo (Russian: Скоморохово) is a rural locality (a village) in Chuchkovskoye Rural Settlement, Sokolsky District, Vologda Oblast, Russia. The population was 10 as of 2002.

== Geography ==
Skomorokhovo is located 89 km northeast of Sokol (the district's administrative centre) by road. Chentsovo is the nearest rural locality.
