= Fedyayevo, Sokolsky District, Vologda Oblast =

Fedyayevo Федяево
- Village
- Location within Vologda Oblast Location within Russia
- Coordinates: 59°41′N 40°23′E
- Country: Russia
- Region: Vologda Oblast
- District: Sokolsky District
- Time zone: UTC+3:00

Fedyayevo (Russian: Федяево) is a rural locality (a village) in Dvinitskoye Rural Settlement, Sokolsky District, Vologda Oblast, Russia. The population was 5 as of 2002.

== Geography ==
Fedyayevo is located 57 km northeast of Sokol (the district's administrative centre) by road. Kaznakuryevo is the nearest rural locality.
