= Malaya Murga =

Malaya Murga Малая Мурга
- Village
- Location within Vologda Oblast Location within Russia
- Coordinates: 59°32′N 40°25′E
- Country: Russia
- Region: Vologda Oblast
- District: Sokolsky District
- Time zone: UTC+3:00

Malaya Murga (Russian: Малая Мурга) is a rural locality (a village) in Kadnikov, Sokolsky District, Vologda Oblast, Russia. The population was 4 as of 2002.

== Geography ==
Malaya Murga is located 31 km northeast of Sokol (the district's administrative centre) by road. Bolshaya Murga is the nearest rural locality.
