= Repnoye, Vologda Oblast =

Repnoye Репное
- Village
- Location within Vologda Oblast Location within Russia
- Coordinates: 59°30′N 40°05′E
- Country: Russia
- Region: Vologda Oblast
- District: Sokolsky District
- Time zone: UTC+3:00

Repnoye (Russian: Репное) is a rural locality (a village) in Prigorodnoye Rural Settlement, Sokolsky District, Vologda Oblast, Russia. The population was 33 as of 2002.

== Geography ==
Repnoye is located 7 km north of Sokol (the district's administrative centre) by road. Zubtsovo is the nearest rural locality.
