= Tataurov Pochinok =

Tataurov Pochinok Татауров Починок
- Village
- Location within Vologda Oblast Location within Russia
- Coordinates: 59°22′N 40°39′E
- Country: Russia
- Region: Vologda Oblast
- District: Sokolsky District
- Time zone: UTC+3:00

Tataurov Pochinok (Russian: Татауров Починок) is a rural locality (a village) in Pelshemskoye Rural Settlement, Sokolsky District, Vologda Oblast, Russia. The population was 2 as of 2002.

== Geography ==
Tataurov Pochinok is located 49 km southeast of Sokol (the district's administrative centre) by road. Berezov Pochinok is the nearest rural locality.
