= Yertebino =

Yertebino Ертебино
- Village
- Location within Vologda Oblast Location within Russia
- Coordinates: 59°31′N 39°57′E
- Country: Russia
- Region: Vologda Oblast
- District: Sokolsky District
- Time zone: UTC+3:00

Yertebino (Russian: Ертебино) is a rural locality (a village) in Arkhangelskoye Rural Settlement, Sokolsky District, Vologda Oblast, Russia. The population was 1 as of 2002.

== Geography ==
Yertebino is located 14 km northwest of Sokol (the district's administrative centre) by road. Bryazgino is the nearest rural locality.
