= Rylovo, Sokolsky District, Vologda Oblast =

Rylovo Рылово
- Village
- Location within Vologda Oblast Location within Russia
- Coordinates: 59°39′N 40°03′E
- Country: Russia
- Region: Vologda Oblast
- District: Sokolsky District
- Time zone: UTC+3:00

Rylovo (Russian: Рылово) is a rural locality (a village) in Nesterovskoye Rural Settlement, Sokolsky District, Vologda Oblast, Russia. The population was 3 as of 2002.

== Geography ==
Rylovo is located 38 km north of Sokol (the district's administrative centre) by road. Trufanovo is the nearest rural locality.
