= Aleksino, Sokolsky District, Vologda Oblast =

Aleksino Алексино
- Village
- Location within Vologda Oblast Location within Russia
- Coordinates: 59°39′N 40°52′E
- Country: Russia
- Region: Vologda Oblast
- District: Sokolsky District
- Time zone: UTC+3:00

Aleksino (Russian: Алексино) is a rural locality (a village) in Vorobyovskoye Rural Settlement, Sokolsky District, Vologda Oblast, Russia. The population was 27 as of 2002.

== Geography ==
Aleksino is located 68 km northeast of Sokol (the district's administrative centre) by road. Malye Ivanovskiye is the nearest rural locality.
