= Bolshoye Yakovkovo =

Bolshoye Yakovkovo Большое Яковково
- Village
- Location within Vologda Oblast Location within Russia
- Coordinates: 59°37′N 40°53′E
- Country: Russia
- Region: Vologda Oblast
- District: Sokolsky District
- Time zone: UTC+3:00

Bolshoye Yakovkovo (Russian: Большое Яковково) is a rural locality (a village) in Vorobyovskoye Rural Settlement, Sokolsky District, Vologda Oblast, Russia. The population was 11 as of 2002.

== Geography ==
Bolshoye Yakovkovo is located 66 km northeast of Sokol (the district's administrative centre) by road. Vorobyovo is the nearest rural locality.
