= Berkovo, Vologda Oblast =

Berkovo Берьково
- Village
- Location within Vologda Oblast Location within Russia
- Coordinates: 59°41′N 40°32′E
- Country: Russia
- Region: Vologda Oblast
- District: Sokolsky District
- Time zone: UTC+3:00

Berkovo (Russian: Берьково) is a rural locality (a village) in Dvinitskoye Rural Settlement, Sokolsky District, Vologda Oblast, Russia. The population was 10 as of 2002.

== Geography ==
Berkovo is located 52 km northeast of Sokol (the district's administrative centre) by road. Naumovskoye is the nearest rural locality.
