= Prudovka =

Prudovka Прудовка
- Village
- Location within Vologda Oblast Location within Russia
- Coordinates: 59°37′N 41°03′E
- Country: Russia
- Region: Vologda Oblast
- District: Sokolsky District
- Time zone: UTC+3:00

Prudovka (Russian: Прудовка) is a rural locality (a village) in Chuchkovskoye Rural Settlement, Sokolsky District, Vologda Oblast, Russia. The population was 6 as of 2002.

== Geography ==
Prudovka is located 75 km northeast of Sokol (the district's administrative centre) by road. Yakovkovo is the nearest rural locality.
