= Titovskoye =

Titovskoye Титовское
- Village
- Location within Vologda Oblast Location within Russia
- Coordinates: 59°35′N 40°51′E
- Country: Russia
- Region: Vologda Oblast
- District: Sokolsky District
- Time zone: UTC+3:00

Titovskoye (Russian: Титовское) is a rural locality (a village) in Vorobyovskoye Rural Settlement, Sokolsky District, Vologda Oblast, Russia. The population was 17 as of 2002.

== Geography ==
Titovskoye is located 74 km northeast of Sokol (the district's administrative centre) by road. Pashikovo is the nearest rural locality.
