= Verkhnyaya Storona =

Verkhnyaya Storona Верхняя Сторона
- Village
- Location within Vologda Oblast Location within Russia
- Coordinates: 59°22′N 40°40′E
- Country: Russia
- Region: Vologda Oblast
- District: Sokolsky District
- Time zone: UTC+3:00

Verkhnyaya Storona (Russian: Верхняя Сторона) is a rural locality (a village) in Pelshemskoye Rural Settlement, Sokolsky District, Vologda Oblast, Russia. The population was 14 as of 2002.

== Geography ==
Verkhnyaya Storona is located 50 km southeast of Sokol (the district's administrative centre) by road. Nizhnyaya Storona is the nearest rural locality.
