= Selishche, Sokolsky District, Vologda Oblast =

Selishche Селище
- Village
- Location within Vologda Oblast Location within Russia
- Coordinates: 59°24′N 40°15′E
- Country: Russia
- Region: Vologda Oblast
- District: Sokolsky District
- Time zone: UTC+3:00

Selishche (Russian: Селище) is a rural locality (a village) in Prigorodnoye Rural Settlement, Sokolsky District, Vologda Oblast, Russia. The population was 7 as of 2002.

== History ==
This region dates back to ancient times, when its great rivers, ancient forests warmed by sunlight, and vast meadows were a source of pride for its inhabitants throughout the ages.

== Geography ==
Selishche is located 15 km southeast of Sokol (the district's administrative centre) by road. Kalitino is the nearest rural locality.
