= Bekrenevo, Sokolsky District, Vologda Oblast =

Bekrenevo Бекренево
- Village
- Location within Vologda Oblast Location within Russia
- Coordinates: 59°27′N 40°02′E
- Country: Russia
- Region: Vologda Oblast
- District: Sokolsky District
- Time zone: UTC+3:00

Bekrenevo (Russian: Бекренево) is a rural locality (a village) in Borovetskoye Rural Settlement, Sokolsky District, Vologda Oblast, Russia. The population was 28 as of 2002.

== Geography ==
Bekrenevo is located 5 km northwest of Sokol (the district's administrative centre) by road. Bilnovo is the nearest rural locality.
