= Timoninskoye =

Timoninskoye Тимонинское
- Village
- Location within Vologda Oblast Location within Russia
- Coordinates: 59°35′N 41°34′E
- Country: Russia
- Region: Vologda Oblast
- District: Sokolsky District
- Time zone: UTC+3:00

Timoninskoye (Russian: Тимонинское) is a rural locality (a village) in Biryakovskoye Rural Settlement, Sokolsky District, Vologda Oblast, Russia. The population was 6 as of 2002.

== Geography ==
Timoninskoye is located 106 km northeast of Sokol (the district's administrative centre) by road. Sledovo is the nearest rural locality.
