= Dmitrikovo, Vologda Oblast =

Dmitrikovo Дмитриково
- Village
- Location within Vologda Oblast Location within Russia
- Coordinates: 59°39′N 40°01′E
- Country: Russia
- Region: Vologda Oblast
- District: Sokolsky District
- Time zone: UTC+3:00

Dmitrikovo (Russian: Дмитриково) is a rural locality (a village) in Nesterovskoye Rural Settlement, Sokolsky District, Vologda Oblast, Russia. The population was 1 as of 2002.

== Geography ==
Dmitrikovo is located 35 km north of Sokol (the district's administrative centre) by road. Derevenka is the nearest rural locality.
