= Sosnovaya Roshcha =

Sosnovaya Roshcha Сосновая Роща
- Village
- Location within Vologda Oblast Location within Russia
- Coordinates: 59°28′N 40°19′E
- Country: Russia
- Region: Vologda Oblast
- District: Sokolsky District
- Time zone: UTC+3:00

Sosnovaya Roshcha (Russian: Сосновая Роща) is a rural locality (a village) in Kadnikov, Sokolsky District, Vologda Oblast, Russia. The population was 377 as of 2002.

== Geography ==
The distance to Sokol is 13 km, to Kadnikov is 1 km. Kadnikov is the nearest rural locality.
