= Vorobyovo, Sokolsky District, Vologda Oblast =

Vorobyovo Воробьёво
- Village
- Location within Vologda Oblast Location within Russia
- Coordinates: 59°37′N 40°53′E
- Country: Russia
- Region: Vologda Oblast
- District: Sokolsky District
- Time zone: UTC+3:00

Vorobyovo (Russian: Воробьёво) is a rural locality (a village) and the administrative center of Vorobyovskoye Rural Settlement, Sokolsky District, Vologda Oblast, Russia. The population was 673 as of 2002. There are 4 streets.

== Geography ==
Vorobyovo is located 67 km northeast of Sokol (the district's administrative centre) by road. Lubodino is the nearest rural locality.
