= Zamoshye, Sokolsky District, Vologda Oblast =

Zamoshye Замошье
- Village
- Location within Vologda Oblast Location within Russia
- Coordinates: 59°29′N 40°32′E
- Country: Russia
- Region: Vologda Oblast
- District: Sokolsky District
- Time zone: UTC+3:00

Zamoshye (Russian: Замошье) is a rural locality (a village) in Kadnikov, Sokolsky District, Vologda Oblast, Russia. The population was 231 as of 2010. There are 7 streets.

== Geography ==
Zamoshye is located 40 km northeast of Sokol (the district's administrative centre) by road. Yakovlevo is the nearest rural locality.
