= Kadnikovsky Uyezd =

Kadnikovsky Uyezd (Russian: Кадниковский уезд) was one of the subdivisions of the Vologda Governorate of the Russian Empire. It was situated in the southwestern part of the governorate. Its administrative centre was Kadnikov. In terms of present-day administrative borders, the territory of Kadnikovsky Uyezd is divided between the Sokolsky, Ust-Kubinsky, Syamzhensky, Kharovsky and Konoshsky districts of Vologda Oblast.

== Demographics ==
At the time of the Russian Empire Census of 1897, Kadnikovsky Uyezd had a population of 188,797. Of these, 99.4% spoke Russian and 0.6% Belarusian as their native language.
