= Arkhangelskoye, Sokolsky District, Vologda Oblast =

Arkhangelskoye Архангельское
- Selo
- Location within Vologda Oblast Location within Russia
- Coordinates: 59°32′N 39°57′E
- Country: Russia
- Region: Vologda Oblast
- District: Sokolsky District
- Time zone: UTC+3:00

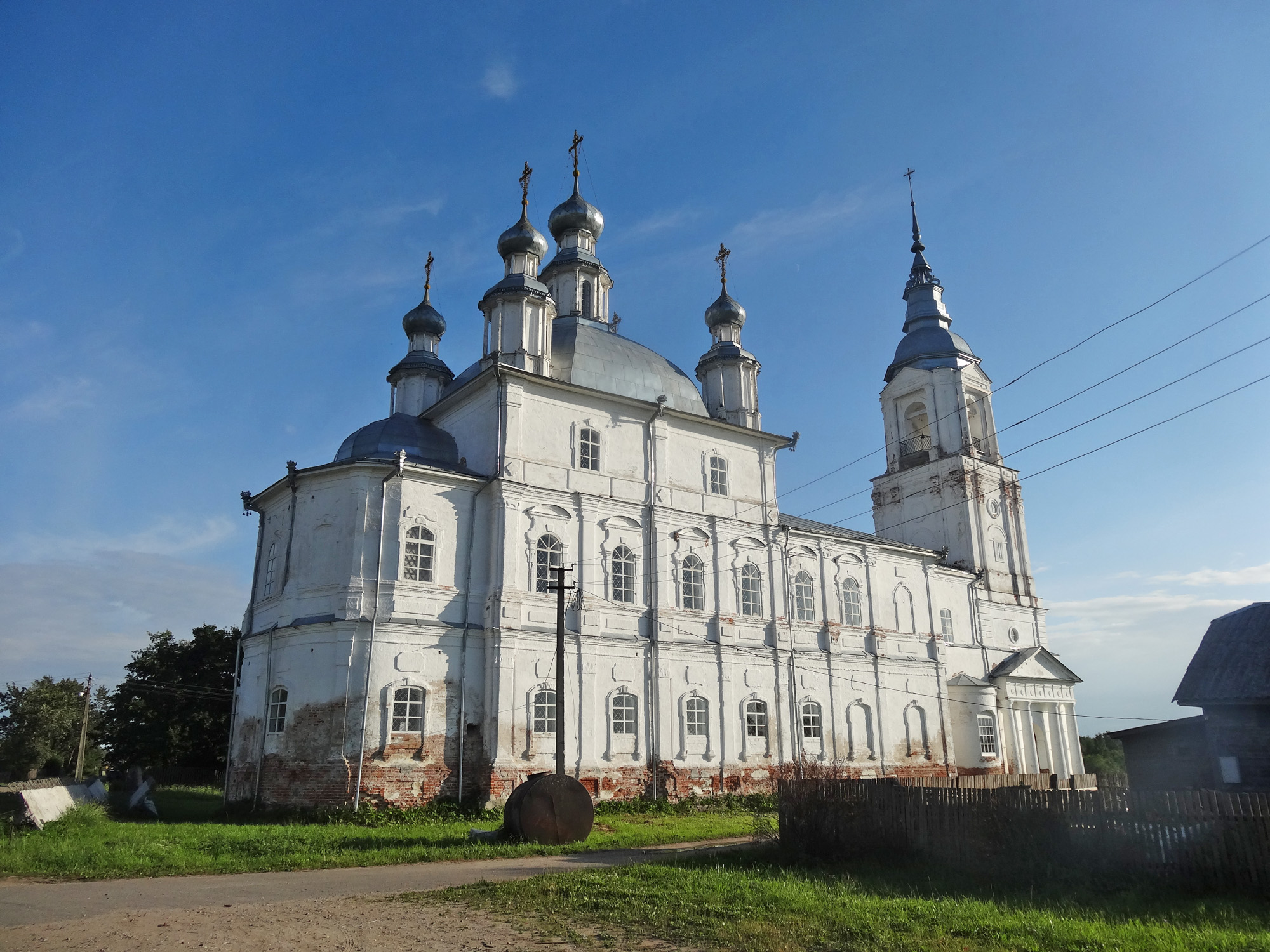
Temple of the Archangel Michael in Arkhangelskoye

Arkhangelskoye (Russian: Архангельское) is a rural locality (a selo) and the administrative center of Arkhangelskoye Rural Settlement, Sokolsky District, Vologda Oblast, Russia. The population was 273 as of 2002.

== Geography ==
The distance to Sokol is 15 km. Koryakino is the nearest rural locality.
