= Biryakovo =

Biryakovo Биряково
- Selo
- Location within Vologda Oblast Location within Russia
- Coordinates: 59°35′N 41°29′E
- Country: Russia
- Region: Vologda Oblast
- District: Sokolsky District
- Time zone: UTC+3:00

Biryakovo (Russian: Биряково) is a rural locality (a selo) and the administrative center of Biryakovskoye Rural Settlement, Sokolsky District, Vologda Oblast, Russia. The population was 799 as of 2002. There are 8 streets.

== Geography ==
Biryakovo is located 102 km northeast of Sokol (the district's administrative centre) by road. Gorka is the nearest rural locality.
