= Chekshino =

Chekshino Чекшино
- Village
- Location within Vologda Oblast Location within Russia
- Coordinates: 59°39′N 40°33′E
- Country: Russia
- Region: Vologda Oblast
- District: Sokolsky District
- Time zone: UTC+3:00

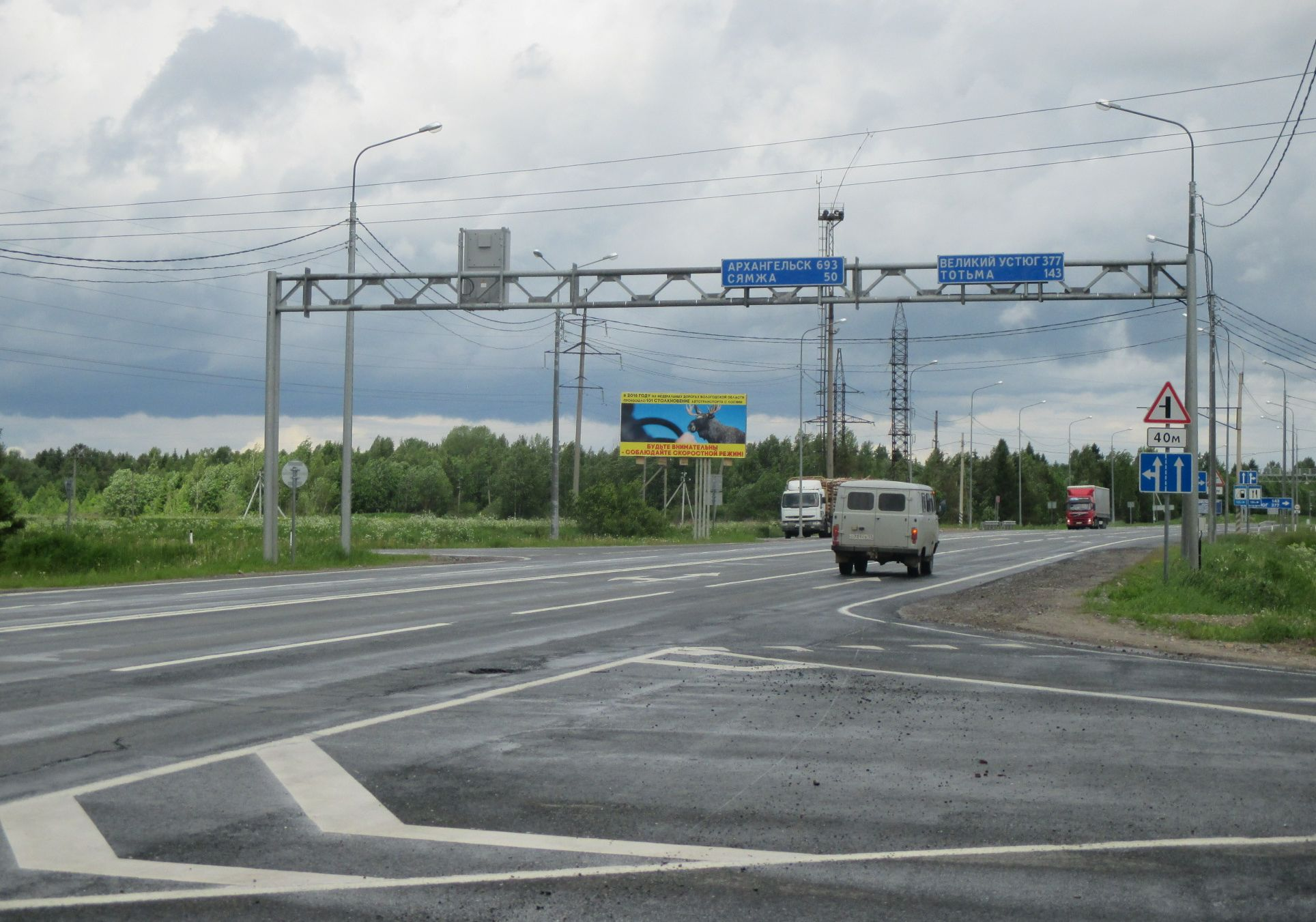
The intersection of A-123 and M-8 in Chekshino

Chekshino (Russian: Чекшино) is a rural locality (a village) and the administrative center of Dvinitskoye Rural Settlement, Sokolsky District, Vologda Oblast, Russia. The population was 566 as of 2002. There are five streets.

== Geography ==
Chekshino is located 47 km northeast of Sokol (the district's administrative centre) by road. Osipovo is the nearest rural locality.
