= Sokolsky District, Vologda Oblast =

Sokolsky District Сокольский район (Russian)
- District
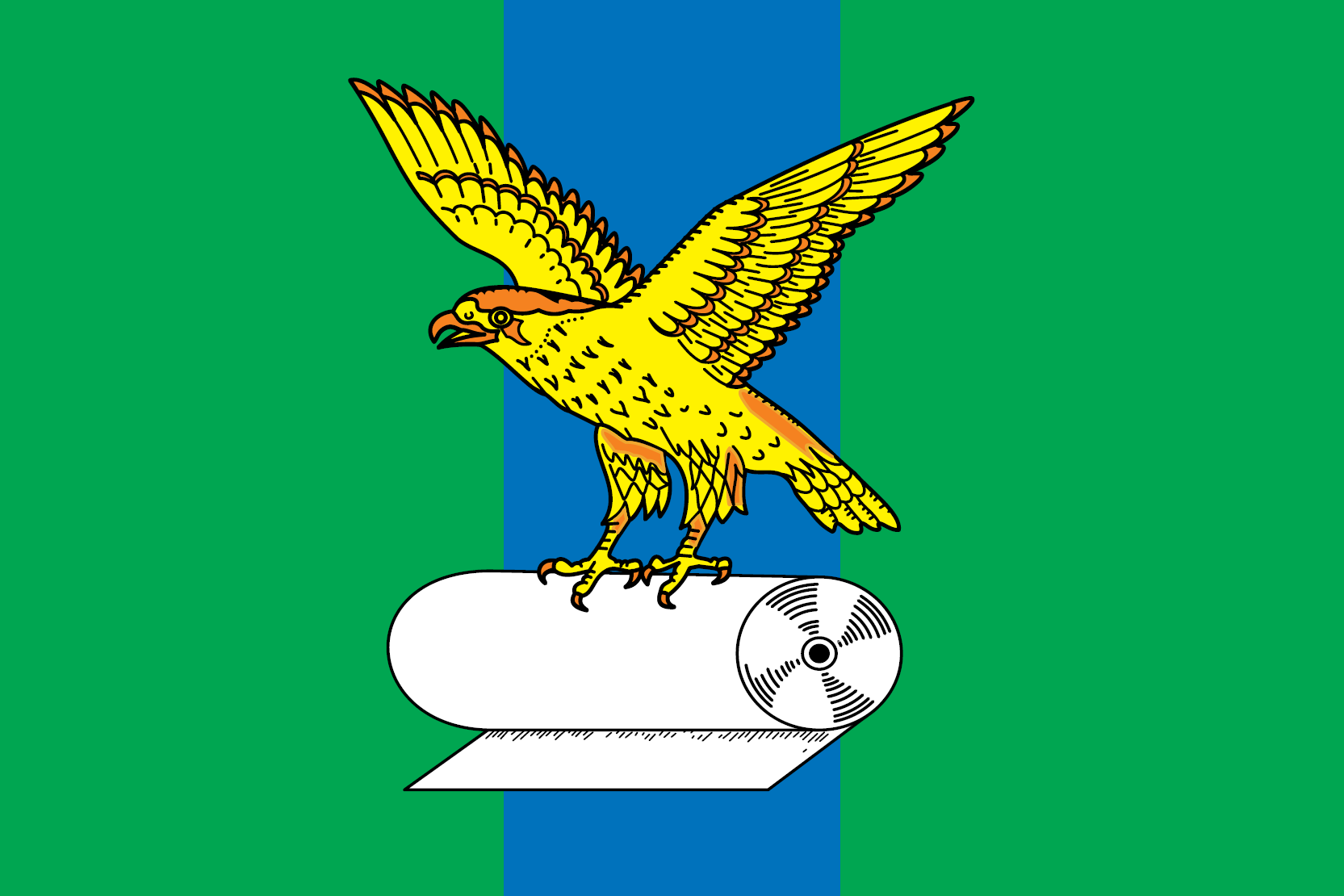
- Flag Coat of arms
- Location of Sokolsky District in Vologda Oblast
- Coordinates: 59°28′N 40°07′E
- Country: Russia
- Federal subject: Vologda Oblast
- Established: July 15, 1929
- Administrative center: Sokol

Area
  - Total: 4,100 km^{2} (1,600 sq mi)

Population (2010 Census)
  - Total: 12,947
  - Density: 3.2/km^{2} (8.2/sq mi)
  - Urban: 37.0%
  - Rural: 63.0%

Administrative structure
  - Administrative divisions: 1 Towns of district significance, 12 Selsoviets
  - Inhabited localities: 1 cities/towns, 406 rural localities

Municipal structure
  - Municipally incorporated as: Sokolsky Municipal District
  - Municipal divisions: 2 urban settlements, 8 rural settlements
- Time zone: UTC+3 (MSK)
- OKTMO ID: 19638000
- Website: http://www.sokoladm.ru

Sokolsky District (Russian: Со́кольский райо́н) is an administrative and municipal district (raion), one of the twenty-six in Vologda Oblast, Russia. It is located in the center of the oblast and borders with Kharovsky and Syamzhensky Districts in the north, Totemsky District in the east, Mezhdurechensky District in the south, Vologodsky District in the southwest, and with Ust-Kubinsky District in the northwest. The area of the district is 4,100 square kilometers (1,600 sq mi). Its administrative center is the town of Sokol (which is not administratively a part of the district). Population: 12,947 (2010 census); 14,951 (2002 Census); 17,585 (1989 Soviet census).

== Geography ==
The district is elongated from west to east and lies in the basin of the Sukhona River. The westernmost part of the district is on the shore of Lake Kubenskoye. The source of the Sukhona is located in Ust-Kubinsky District, but a relatively short stretch of the river course runs through the district downstream of the source. In particular, the town of Sokol is located on the banks of the Sukhona. The rivers in the central and eastern parts of the district drain into the Dvinitsa River which crosses the district from north to south, as well as into other tributaries of the Sukhona such as the Pelshma, the Strelitsa, and the Tsaryova. The northwest of the district lies in the basin of the Kubena River which forms the border between Sokolsky and Ust-Kubensky Districts. The northeast of the district is in the basin of the Syamzhena River, a major tributary of the Kubena.

Considerable parts of the district are covered by forests.

== History ==
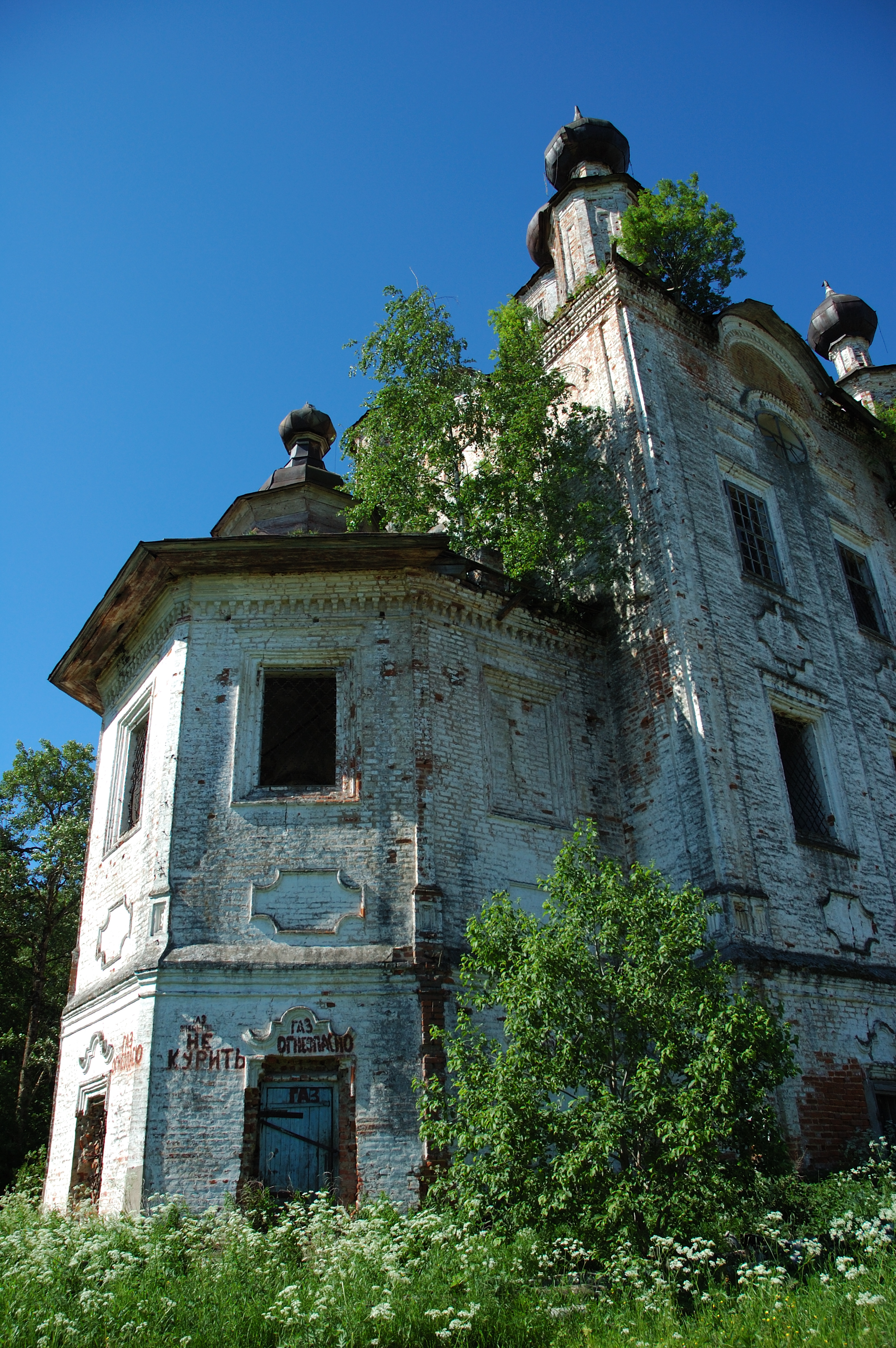
The Intercession Church in the selo of Zamoshye

The area was populated by Finnic peoples and then colonized by the Novgorod Republic. In the 13th century, it became a part of the Principality of Beloozero. In the 14th century, the Principality of Beloozero became a part of the Grand Duchy of Moscow; however, lands adjacent of Lake Kubenskoye remained quasi-independent until the 15th century. In 1345, the lands along Lake Kubenskoye were organized into three principalities: the Principality of Novlenskoye southwest of the lake, the Principality of Zaozyorye northeast of the lake, and the Principality of Kubena southwest of the Kubena (the area was generally known as Kubena). The current area of the district partially overlaps with the area of the Principality of Kubena, which only existed for a short period before merging with the Principality of Zaozyorye. Before 1447, both became a part of the Grand Duchy of Moscow as well. Some of the villages in the area were first mentioned in the 15th century, including Kadnikov, which was first mentioned in 1492.

In the course of the administrative reform carried out in 1708 by Peter the Great, the area was included into Archangelgorod Governorate. In 1780, Arkhangelogorod Governorate was abolished and transformed into Vologda Viceroyalty, and in 1796 the latter was split into Arkhangelsk and Vologda Governorates. What is now Sokolsky District was then a part of Kadnikovsky Uyezd of Vologda Governorate. Kadnikov was chartered in 1780.

In November 1923, the Vologda Executive Committee decided to create Sverdlovsko-Sukhonsky District with the administrative center in the settlement of Sokol; however, the decision was not approved by the central authorities, and the district was never created.

On July 15, 1929, the uyezds were abolished, the governorates merged into Northern Krai, and Sverdlovsky District with the administrative center in the work settlement of Sokol was established among others. It became a part of Vologda Okrug of Northern Krai. In 1932, Sokol was granted town status, and the district was renamed Sokolsky. In the following years, the first-level administrative division of Russia kept changing. In 1936, the krai was transformed into Northern Oblast. In 1937, Northern Oblast itself was split into Arkhangelsk Oblast and Vologda Oblast. Sokolsky District remained in Vologda Oblast ever since.

On January 25, 1935, Biryakovsky District was established on the lands which previously belonged to Sokolsky and Mezhdurechensky Districts. The administrative center of the district became the selo of Biryakovo, currently in Sokolsky District. In 1959, it was abolished and split between Sokolsky and Mezhdurechensky Districts.

== Administrative and municipal divisions ==
Within the framework of administrative divisions, Sokolsky District is one of the twenty-six in the oblast. The town of Sokol serves as its administrative center, despite being incorporated separately as a town of oblast significance—an administrative unit with the status equal to that of the districts. The district is divided into one town of district significance (Kadnikov) and twelve selsoviets.

As a municipal division, the district is incorporated as Sokolsky Municipal District and is divided into two urban and eight rural settlements, with the town of oblast significance of Sokol being incorporated within the municipal district as Sokol Urban Settlement. The town of Kadnikov is also incorporated within the municipal district as an urban settlement (Kadnikov Urban Settlement).

== Population ==
Population size
1939	66452	2013	▼50 574
1959	▼31 630	2014	▼50 208
1970	▼25 484	2015	▼49 735
1979	▼21 652	2016	▼49 416
1989	▼17 585	2017	▼49 077
2002	▼14 951	2018	▼48 563
2009	▲53 762	2019	▼48 133
2010	▼53 417	2020	▼47 763
2011	▼51 400	2021	▼45 811
2012	▼50 864	2023	▼45 129

== Economy ==
=== Industry ===
In the town of Kadnikov, there are timber industry and food industry enterprises.

=== Agriculture ===
Production of milk, crops, and potatoes dominates the district's agriculture.

=== Transportation ===
The railway connecting Vologda and Arkhangelsk crosses the district from south to north. In particular, Sukhona railway station is located in Sokol.

One of the principal highways in Russia, M8, which connects Moscow and Arkhangelsk, crosses the district from south to north, passing Sokol and Kadnikov. In Chekshino, another highway branches off east and runs to Totma and Veliky Ustyug. It provides the shortest connection between Vologda and the eastern parts of Vologda Oblast, in particular, Nikolsk, Nyuksenitsa, and Kichmengsky Gorodok. Other roads connect Sokol with Kharovsk and Ustye. There are also local roads, with the bus traffic originating from Sokol.

The Sukhona is navigable within the limits of the district; however, there is no passenger navigation.

== Culture and recreation ==
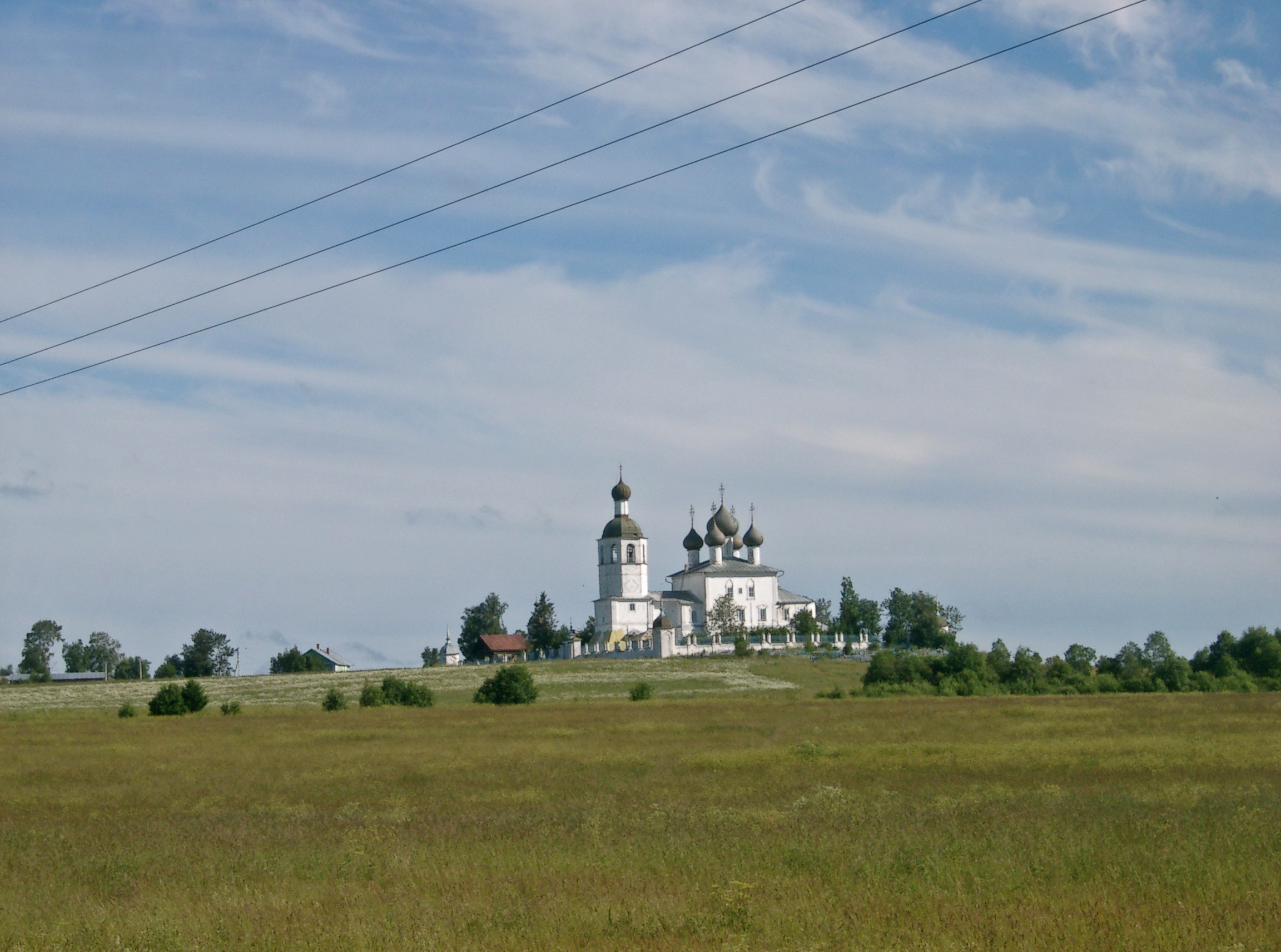
Ilyinsky Pogost close to the town of Kadnikov

The district contains 3 cultural heritage monuments of federal significance (the ensemble of Ilyinsky Pogost several kilometers north of Kadnikov and the Church of Archangel Michael in the selo of Arkhangelskoye) and additionally 101 objects classified as cultural and historical heritage of local significance (35 of them located in the town of Kadnikov).

In addition to the Sokol District Museum, located in Sokol, the district hosts the Kadnikov Museum of History, which was opened in 1985 and is located in one of the historical buildings in the center of Kadnikov.
