= Baltic Uplands =

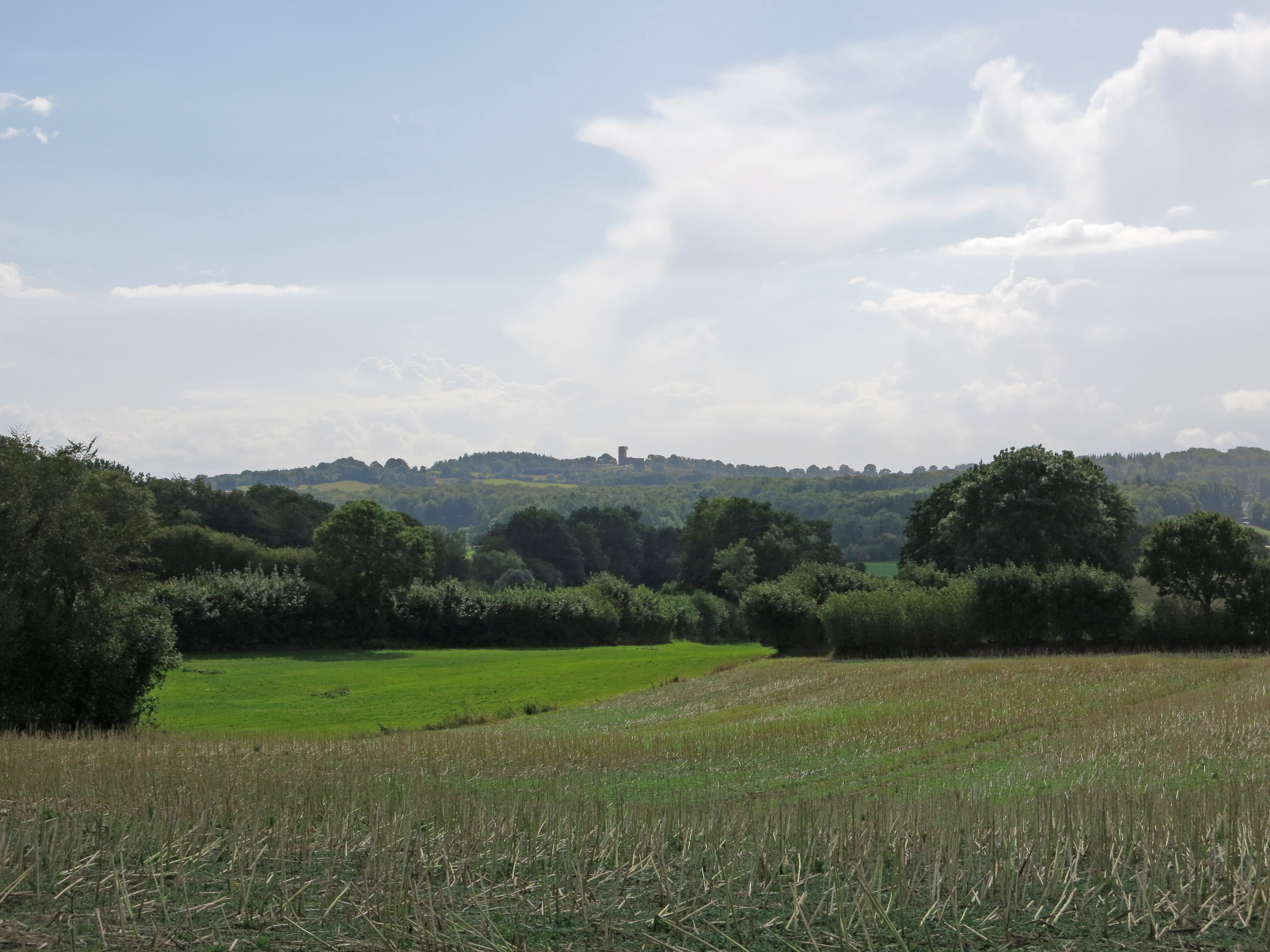
The Aschberg in the Hütten Hills, a part of the Baltic Uplands

The Baltic Uplands (German: Baltischer Landrücken or Nördlicher Landrücken) is a chain of morainic hills about 200 kilometres (120 mi) wide that border the southern Baltic Sea from Jutland to Estonia.

== Geography ==
The uplands, which reach a height of 329 m above sea level (NN) at Wieżyca (German: Turmberg), form the western part of the East European Plain. To the north they descend steadily into the Gulf of Finland. Towards the east they merge into the Belarusian Ridge; to the southeast they sink gradually into the Polesian depression. To the south the terrain falls away into the extensive Vistula basin. To the west the Uplands are bordered by the North German Plain and in the northwest the terrain drops away westwards from the Schleswig-Holstein Uplands into the North Sea.

The Baltic Uplands are crossed by the rivers Oder, Vistula, Memel and Düna. Their component hill ranges are, from west to east, the Angeln, Schwansen, Hütten Hills, Danish Wahld, Holstein Switzerland, Mecklenburg Switzerland, Pomeranian Lake Plateau (with the Wieżyca), the Masurian Lake District (with the Wzgórza Szeskie (German: Seesker Höhe), Sudovian Upland and the Lower Lithuanian Ridge.

== Economy, tourism, and landscape ==
The low, rolling, ground moraine landscape is fertile and supports highly productive arable farming. The chain of lakes and end moraine ridges are popular holiday areas. The poorer, sandy areas are largely covered by pine forest (e. g. Schorfheide, Tucheler Heide, Rominter Heide).

== See also ==
- East European Plain
- Uplands
