= List of highest points of Russian federal subjects =

This is a list of the highest points of the Federal Subjects of the Russian Federation.

== List ==
=== Above 1000 m ===
Highest point	Russian name	Elevation	Federal subject	Location
Elbrus	Эльбрус	5,642 metres (18,510 ft)	Kabardino-Balkaria; Karachay-Cherkessia	Lateral Range, Eastern Caucasus
Kazbek	Казбек	5,033 metres (16,512 ft)	North Ossetia–Alania	Lateral Range, Eastern Caucasus
Klyuchevskaya Sopka	Ключевская Сопка	4,754 metres (15,597 ft)	Kamchatka Krai	Eastern Range (Kamchatka)
Belukha	Белуха	4,506 metres (14,783 ft)	Altai Republic	Altai Mountains
Tebulosmta	Тебулосмта	4,493 metres (14,741 ft)	Chechnya	Lateral Range, Eastern Caucasus
Bazardüzü	Базардюзю	4,466 metres (14,652 ft)	Dagestan	Main Caucasian Range, Greater Caucasus
Shani	Шан	4,451 metres (14,603 ft)	Ingushetia	Main Caucasian Range, Greater Caucasus
Mongun-Taiga	Монгун-Тайга	3,970 metres (13,020 ft)	Tuva	Altai Mountains
Mönkh Saridag	Мунку-Сардык	3,491 metres (11,453 ft)	Buryatia	Eastern Sayan, Sayan Mountains
Tsakhvoa	Цахвоа	3,345 metres (10,974 ft)	Krasnodar Krai	Western Caucasus
Chugush	Чугуш	3,237 metres (10,620 ft)	Adygea	Western Caucasus
BAM Peak	Пик БАМ	3,072 metres (10,079 ft)	Zabaykalsky Krai	Kodar Range, Stanovoy Highlands
Peak Pobeda	Пик Победа	3,003 metres (9,852 ft)	Yakutia	Buordakh Massif, Ulakhan-Chistay, Chersky Range
Kyzlasov Peak	Пик Кызласова	2,969 metres (9,741 ft)	Khakassia	Western Sayan, Sayan Mountains
Pik Martena	Пик Мартена	2,988 metres (9,803 ft)	Irkutsk Oblast	Kodar Range, Stanovoy Highlands
Berill	Берилл	2,934 metres (9,626 ft)	Khabarovsk Krai	Suntar-Khayata Range
Grandiozny Peak	Пик Грандиозный	2,891 metres (9,485 ft)	Krasnoyarsk Krai	Kryzhin Range, Eastern Sayan, Sayan Mountains
Mayak Shangina	Маяк Шангина	2,490 metres (8,170 ft)	Altai Krai	Korgon Range, Sayan Mountains
Alaid	Алаид	2,339 metres (7,674 ft)	Sakhalin Oblast	Atlasov Island, Kurils
Unnamed	—	2,337 metres (7,667 ft)	Magadan Oblast	Okhandya Range, Chersky Range
Gorod-Makit	Город-Макит	2,298 metres (7,539 ft)	Amur Oblast	Yam-Alin
Verkhny Zub	Верхний Зуб	2,178 metres (7,146 ft)	Kemerovo Oblast	Kuznetsk Alatau
Anik	Аник	1,932 metres (6,339 ft)	Primorsky Krai	Sikhote-Alin
Mount Narodnaya	Народная	1,894 metres (6,214 ft)	Khanty-Mansi Autonomous Okrug; Komi	Urals
Iskhodnaya	Исходная	1,887 metres (6,191 ft)	Chukotka Autonomous Okrug	Chantal Range, Chukotka Mountains
Mount Karpinsky	Гора Карпинского	1,878 metres (6,161 ft)	Komi	Issledovatelsky Range, Subpolar Urals
Yamantau	Ямантау	1,640 metres (5,380 ft)	Bashkortostan	Southern Urals
Unnamed	—	1,603 metres (5,259 ft)	Stavropol Krai	Kabardian Range (south of Kislovodsk)
Konzhakovskiy Kamen	Конжаковский Камень	1,569 metres (5,148 ft)	Sverdlovsk Oblast	Konzhakov-Serebryan Massif, Northern Urals
Mount Kruzenshtern	Гора Крузенштерна	1,547 metres (5,075 ft)	Arkhangelsk Oblast	Northern Island, Novaya Zemlya
Roman-Kosh	Роман-Кош	1,545 metres (5,069 ft)	Crimea	Crimean Mountains
Payer	Пайер	1,472 metres (4,829 ft)	Yamalo-Nenets Autonomous Okrug	Polar Urals
Tulymsky Kamen	Тулымский Камень	1,469 metres (4,820 ft)	Perm Krai	Northern Urals
Mount Studencheskaya	Гора Студенческая	1,421 metres (4,662 ft)	Jewish Autonomous Oblast	Bureya Range
Nurgush	Нургуш	1,406 metres (4,613 ft)	Chelyabinsk Oblast	Southern Urals
Yudychvumchorr	Юдычвумчорр	1,201 metres (3,940 ft)	Murmansk Oblast	Khibiny Mountains
Chuvash-Koi	Чуваш-Кой	1,051 metres (3,448 ft)	Sevastopol	Tarpan-Bair Mountains

=== Below 1000 m ===
Highest point	Russian name	Elevation	Federal subject	Location
Nakas	Накас	667 metres (2,188 ft)	Orenburg Oblast	Southern Urals
Nuorunen	Нуорунен	576 metres (1,890 ft)	Karelia	Maanselkä
Pikhtovyy Greben'	Пихтовый гребень	502 metres (1,647 ft)	Novosibirsk Oblast	Salair Ridge
Morye-Iz	Море-Из	423 metres (1,388 ft)	Nenets Autonomous Okrug	Pai-Khoi Range
Nablyudatel	Наблюдатель	381 metres (1,250 ft)	Samara Oblast	Zhiguli Mountains, Volga Upland
Unnamed	—	369 metres (1,211 ft)	Saratov Oblast	Khvalynsk Mountains
Unnamed	—	363 metres (1,191 ft)	Ulyanovsk Oblast	Volga Upland
Mount Serpokrylovskaya	гора Серпокрыловская	358 metres (1,175 ft)	Volgograd Oblast	Don-Medveditsa Ridge, Volga Upland
Makushka Valdaya	Макушка Валдая	346 metres (1,135 ft)	Tver Oblast	Valdai Upland
Unnamed	—	342 metres (1,122 ft)	Penza Oblast	Khvalynsk Mountains
Lipnitskaya	Липницкая	339 metres (1,112 ft)	Pskov Oblast	Bezhanitsy Upland
Unnamed	—	338 metres (1,109 ft)	Mordovia	Volga Upland
Krasnoyar	Краснояр	337 metres (1,106 ft)	Kirov Oblast	Upper Kama Upland
Unnamed	—	332 metres (1,089 ft)	Udmurtia	Upper Kama Upland
Chatyr-Tau	Чатыр-тау	321 metres (1,053 ft)	Tatarstan	Bugulma-Belebey Upland
Unnamed	—	319 metres (1,047 ft)	Smolensk Oblast	Smolensk-Moscow Upland
Zamri-Gora	Замри-гора	310 metres (1,020 ft)	Moscow Oblast	Moscow Upland, Smolensk-Moscow Upland
Unnamed	—	306 metres (1,004 ft)	Rostov Oblast	Salsk-Manych Ridge
Malgora	Мальгора	304 metres (997 ft)	Vologda Oblast	Vepsian Upland
Unnamed	—	299 metres (981 ft)	Novgorod Oblast	Valdai Upland
Sondoba	Холм Сондоба	293.3 metres (962 ft)	Kostroma Oblast	Galich-Chukhloma Upland
Unnamed	—	293.2 metres (962 ft)	Tula Oblast	Near Raevo village, Central Russian Upland
Gapselga	Гапсельга	291 metres (955 ft)	Leningrad Oblast	Vepsian Upland
Tarkhov Hill	Тархов холм	292 metres (958 ft)	Yaroslavl Oblast	Borisoglebsk Upland
Unnamed	—	288 metres (945 ft)	Bryansk Oblast	On the right bank of the Desna, Smolensk Upland
Unnamed	—	286 metres (938 ft)	Chuvashia	Inconspicuous elevation near Yablonovka village
Unnamed	—	285.9 metres (938 ft)	Oryol Oblast	Near Dementievka village, Central Russian Upland
Chuksha	Чукша	278.8 metres (915 ft)	Mari El	Vyatsky Uval
Unnamed	—	276.8 metres (908 ft)	Belgorod Oblast	Inconspicuous elevation in Prokhorovsky District, Central Russian Upland
Zaitseva Gora	Зайцева Гора	275 metres (902 ft)	Kaluga Oblast	Central Russian Upland
Unnamed	—	274.5 metres (901 ft)	Kursk Oblast	Near Olkhovatka village, Central Russian Upland
Unnamed	—	274.2 metres (900 ft)	Tomsk Oblast	Slight elevation in the West Siberian Plain
Unnamed	—	271.4 metres (890 ft)	Vladimir Oblast	Klinsk-Dmitrov Ridge, Moscow Upland
Unnamed	—	268 metres (879 ft)	Voronezh Oblast	Elevation at the Kursk Oblast border, Central Russian Upland
Unnamed	—	260.6 metres (855 ft)	Lipetsk Oblast	Smolensk-Moscow Upland
Teplostan Upland	Теплостанская возвышенность	254.6 metres (835 ft)	Moscow	On the right bank of the Moskva
Unnamed	—	252 metres (827 ft)	Nizhny Novgorod Oblast	On the right bank of the Volga, Volga Upland
Unnamed	—	242.1 metres (794 ft)	Kaliningrad Oblast	Vishtynetsk Upland
Unnamed	—	236 metres (774 ft)	Ryazan Oblast	Central Russian Upland
Shared	Шаред	222 metres (728 ft)	Kalmykia	Cholun-Khamur Ridge, Yergeni
Unnamed	—	219.4 metres (720 ft)	Tambov Oblast	High point of an undulation, Oka–Don Lowland
Unnamed	—	212.7 metres (698 ft)	Ivanovo Oblast	Near the border with Vladimir Oblast, Moscow Upland
Unnamed	—	210.6 metres (691 ft)	Kurgan Oblast	Slight elevation in the interfluve of the Uy and Miass rivers
Mount Orekhovaya	Ореховая гора	175.9 metres (577 ft)	St. Petersburg	Duderhof Heights
Unnamed	—	152.6 metres (501 ft)	Tyumen Oblast	Hill in the southern part of the oblast —excluding autonomous regions
Unnamed	—	150.4 metres (493 ft)	Omsk Oblast	Near Nagornoye village
Bolshoye Bogdo	Большое Богдо	149 metres (489 ft)	Astrakhan Oblast	Long hill rising above Lake Baskunchak

== See also ==
- List of mountains and hills of Russia
- List of European ultra-prominent peaks
- List of Ultras of Central Asia
- List of ultras of Northeast Asia
