= Upland =

Upland or Uplands may refer to:

== Geography ==
- Hill, an area of higher land, generally
- Highland, an area of higher land divided into low and high points
- Upland and lowland, conditional descriptions of a plain based on elevation above sea level

== Places ==
=== Australia ===
- Upland, Queensland, a locality in the Barcaldine Region
- Desert Uplands, a bio-region in Queensland

=== Canada ===
- CFB Uplands, a former Canadian Forces Base located in Ottawa, Ontario
  - Uplands, Ottawa, a neighbourhood in Ottawa
- Uplands, Greater Victoria, a Vancouver Island neighbourhood in the northeast Oak Bay, British Columbia
  - Uplands Park, an undeveloped natural reserve in the Uplands neighbourhood
- Uplands Ski Centre, a ski area in Thornhill, Ontario
- The Uplands, Edmonton, a future neighbourhood
- Uplands, Ontario, a neighbourhood in the City of London, Ontario

=== Germany ===
- Upland (mountain range), in Hesse and Westphalia

=== Kenya ===
- Uplands, an area in Lari Constituency

=== Norway ===
- Uplands, Norway, an ancient name for the agricultural lands and forests to the north of Oslo in Norway

=== South Africa ===
- Uplands College, a high school near Mpumalanga, South Africa

=== Sweden ===
- Uppland, a historical province on the eastern coast of Sweden, including the northern shores of Stockholm, Sweden

=== United Kingdom ===
- Uplands, Gloucestershire, a location in England
- Uplands, Swansea, a suburb and community of Swansea, Wales
  - Uplands (electoral ward), an electoral ward in Swansea, Wales
- Uplands Academy, a secondary school in Wadhurst, East Sussex, England
- Upland Britain, a list of semi-natural habitats

=== United States ===
- Upland South, the northern part of the Southern United States, in contrast to the Deep South
- Upland, California, a city
- Upland, Indiana, a town
- Indiana Uplands, a geographical region in south-central Indiana
- Upland, Kansas, a rural unincorporated community
- Upland, Nebraska, a village
- Upland, Pennsylvania, a borough
- Upland, Texas, a ghost town
- Upland, West Virginia (disambiguation)
- Uplands, Baltimore, a neighborhood

== Other uses ==
- Upland (restaurant), a restaurant in New York City
- Upland, a song by Edgar Froese from the album Aqua
- Upland (UPL), a wetland indicator status for plants
- Upland Brewing Company, a brewery in Bloomington, Indiana
- Uplands nation, a student society at Uppsala University, Sweden
- Upland cotton, the cultivated Gossypium hirsutum cotton
- Uplands Party, a political party that stands candidates in Uplands (electoral ward)

== See also ==
- Uplands School (disambiguation)
- Uplander (disambiguation)
