= Chigirin Reservoir =

Chigirin Reservoir (Russian: Чигиринское водохранилище) may refer to one of the following.

- Chigirin Reservoir, Amur, a reservoir by Amur River, Russia
- Chigirin Reservoir, Drut, a reservoir by Drut River, Belarus
