= Zamri-Gora =

Mountain in Moscow Oblast, Russia

- Замри-гора
- Location within Moscow Oblast

Highest point
- Elevation: 310 m (1,020 ft)
- Coordinates: 55°29′20″N 35°29′25″E

Geography
- Country: Russia
- Region: Moscow Oblast
- Parent range: Moscow Uplands

Zamri-Gora (Russian: Замри-гора) is the highest point of Moscow Oblast, standing at 310 m (1,020 ft) above sea level. It is located near the village of Shapkino, Mozhaysky District and is also the highest point of the Moscow Uplands.

Zamri-Gora is a sacred mountain of the Early Slavs, with which their legends and traditions are associated. On Kupala Night, buffoons from all over Muscovy were drawn to Zamri-Gora. They arranged their performances, and the Magi made fires and performed rituals. The buffoons kept a silver mask in a treasured hiding place.

On 25 November 2017, the grand opening of the Zamri-Gora memorial stone, installed on the initiative and at the expense of members of the Moscow Regional Branch of the Russian Geographical Society, took place. The weight of the stone is five tons, it has a commemorative plaque.

== See also ==
- List of highest points of Russian federal subjects
