= Oshta =

Oshta Ошта
- Selo
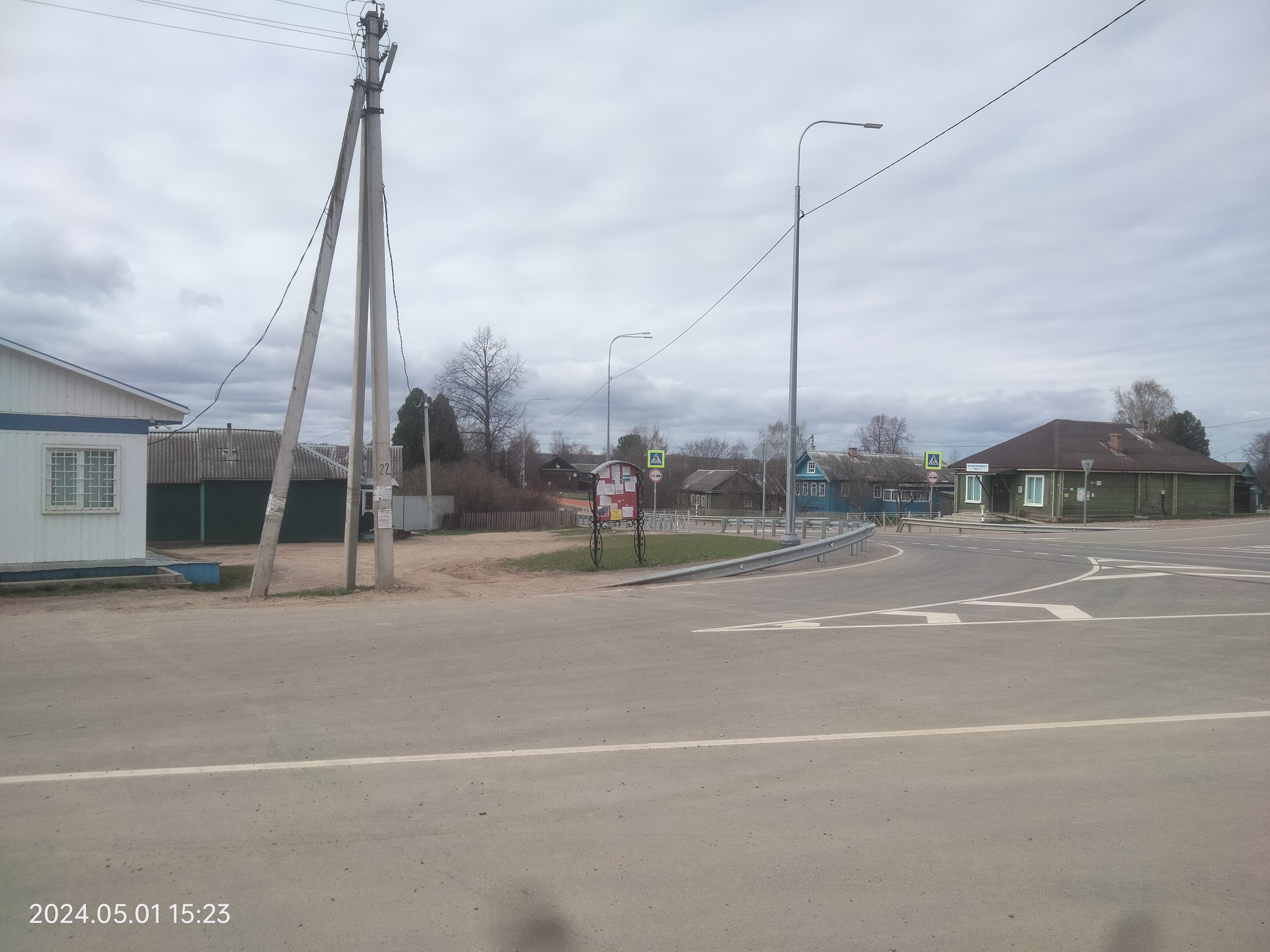

- Location within Vologda Oblast Location within Russia
- Coordinates: 60°51′N 35°33′E
- Country: Russia
- Region: Vologda Oblast
- District: Vytegorsky District
- Time zone: UTC+3:00

Oshta (Russian: О́шта; Veps: Šušt) is a rural locality (a selo) in the Oshta Rural Settlement of Vytegorsky District, Vologda Oblast, Russia. The population was 1,064 as of 2010. There are 19 streets.

== Geography ==
Oshta is located 64 kilometres (40 mi) southwest of Vytegra (the district's administrative centre) by road. Malgora, the highest point of the Vepsian Upland, rises to the east of Oshta. The river Oshta flows through the village.

== History ==
The pogost of Oshta was first mentioned in 1496. It was the administrative centre of the Zaonezhye pogosts and had a church dedicated to Saint Nicholas. After pogosts had ceased to be a distinct type of settlement, the word became part of the village's name: Oshtinsky Pogost (Оштинский Погост). Later on, it was part of the Lodeynopolsky Uyezd.

With the establishment of the Leningrad Oblast in August 1927, Oshtinsky Pogost became the administrative centre of the Oshtinsky District within it, as well as that of the Oshta selsoviet within the district. The district was transferred to the Vologda Oblast when it was established on 23 September 1937.

During the Continuation War, from 1 October 1941 until 24 June 1944, the district was partially under Finnish occupation. The front line was located some four kilometres (2.5 mi) from Oshtinsky Pogost. Today, there is a 32.5 m × 62.9 m (107 ft × 206 ft) memorial in the village for Soviet soldiers who died in nearby battles.

On 12 December 1955, the Oshtinsky District was split between the Vytegorsky and Babayevsky Districts.

The modern settlement of Oshta was formed in 2001, when the villages of Andreyevo, Cheleksa, Kurgino, Neshkina, Niz and Tarasino were merged into Oshtinsky Pogost.

On 2 November 2016, the Megra and Kazakovo rural settlements were merged into the Oshta rural settlement, with its new centre in Megra.
