= Drut (river) =

River in Belarus

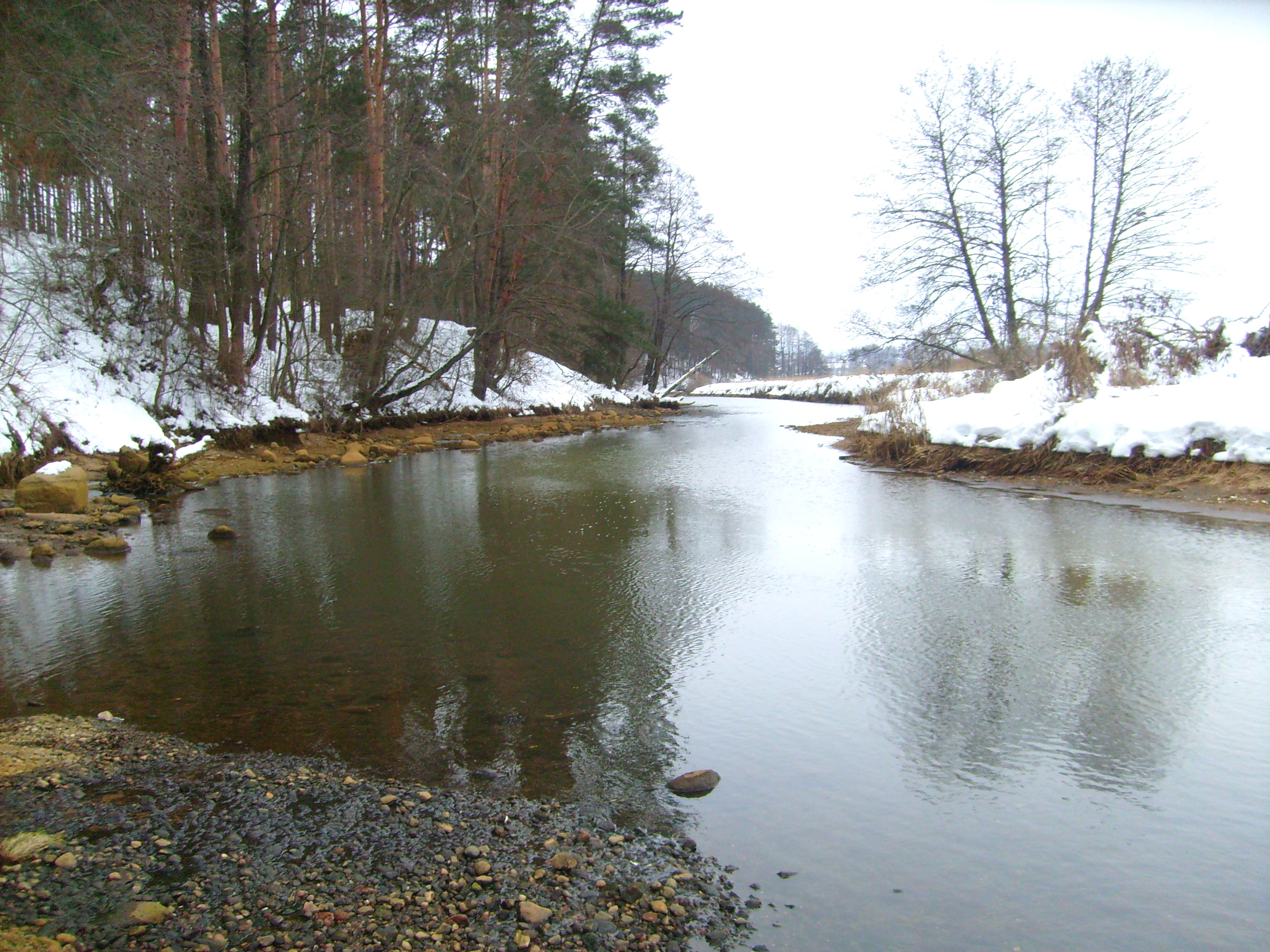

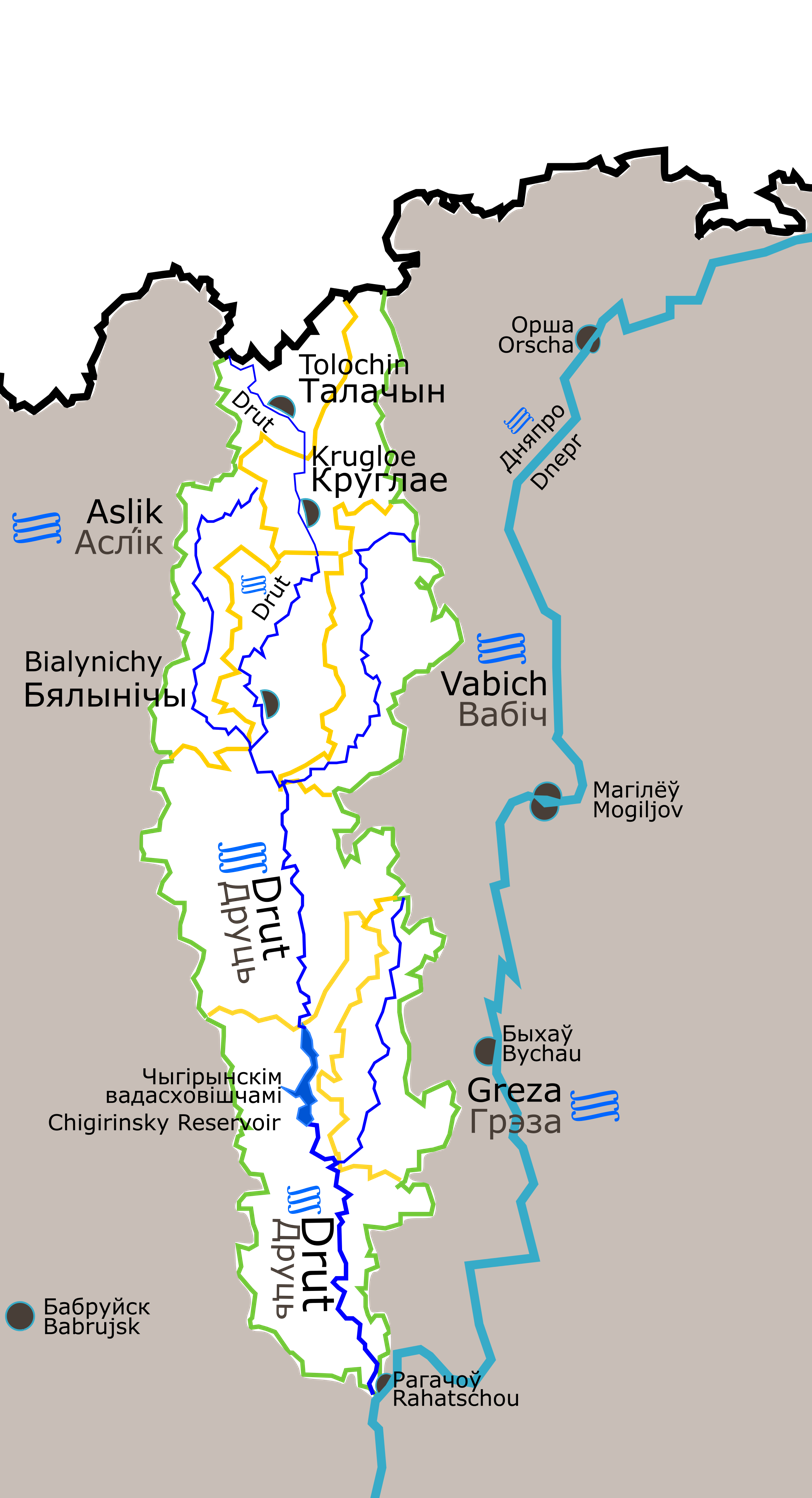

Location
- Country: Belarus

Physical characteristics
- Mouth: Dnieper
  - coordinates: 53°03′25″N 30°01′46″E
- Length: 295 km (183 mi)
- Basin size: 5,020 km^{2} (1,940 sq mi)
- Discharge
  - average: 30 m^{3}/s (1,100 cu ft/s)

Basin features
- Progression: Dnieper→ Dnieper–Bug estuary→ Black Sea

The Drut or Druts (Belarusian: Друць, romanized: Druć, [drut͡sʲ]; Russian: Друть, [drutʲ]) is a river in Belarus, a right tributary of Dnieper. It originates in the Orsha Upland in the Belarusian Ridge and flows through the Vitebsk, Mogilev and Gomel regions of Belarus. It is 295 kilometres (183 mi) long, and has a 5,020 square kilometres (1,940 sq mi) drainage basin.

The cities of Talachyn, Kruhlaye, Byalynichy, and Rahachow are located on the Drut.

The Chihirin Reservoir on the Drut river has an area of 21.1 square kilometers (8.1 sq mi).
