= Malgora =

Mountain in Vologda Oblast, Russia

- Мальгора
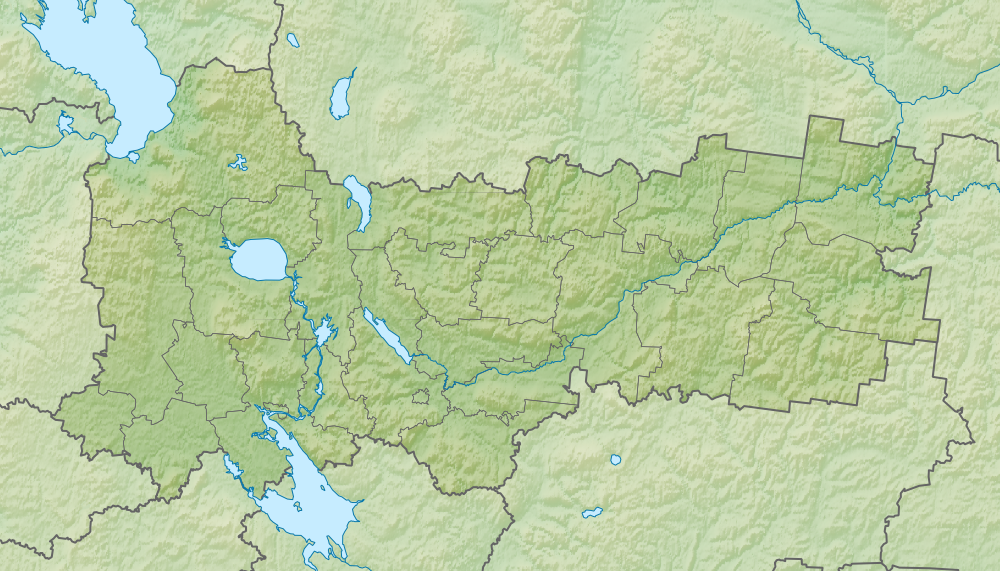
- Location within Vologda Oblast Location within European Russia

Highest point
- Elevation: 304 m (997 ft)
- Prominence: 141 m (463 ft)
- Coordinates: 60°40′41″N 35°22′43″E

Geography
- Location: Vytegorsky District; Vologda Oblast, Russia
- Parent range: Vepsian Upland

Climbing
- Easiest route: From Oshta

Malgora (Russian: Мальгора) is a peak in Vologda Oblast, Russia. It is the highest point in the region.

== Etymology ==
Despite being a major summit of the Vepsian Upland, the name of the mountain is not of Vepsian origin, but is likely derived from the Karelian word "malja" ("bowl").

== Description ==
Malgora is a 304 metres (997 ft) high mountain located just east of Oshta in the Vepsian Upland. The mountain rises in the northwestern sector of the Vytegorsky District and is the highest point of the Vepsian Hills.

The summit is of difficult access, its slopes being covered with dense coniferous forest. There is a geodetic marker at the top.

== See also ==
- List of highest points of Russian federal subjects
- List of mountains and hills of Russia
