= Gapselga =

Mountain in Leningrad Oblast, Russia

- Гапсельга
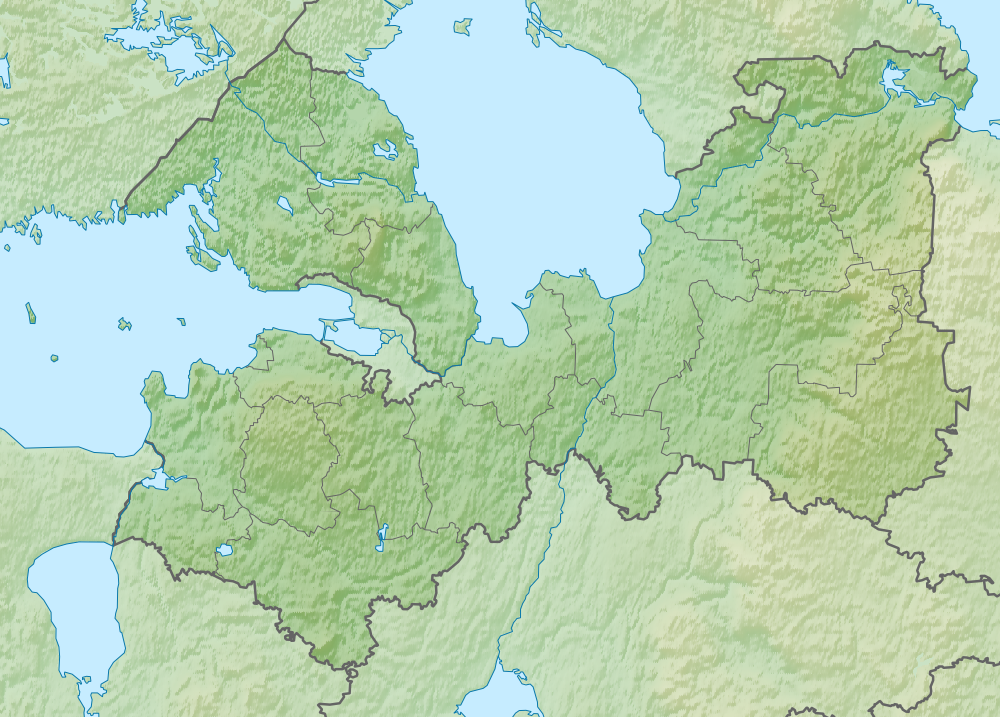
- Location within Leningrad Oblast

Highest point
- Elevation: 291 m (955 ft)
- Coordinates: 60°28′43″N 35°10′22″E

Geography
- Country: Russia
- Region: Leningrad Oblast
- Parent range: Vepsian Upland

Gapselga (Russian: Гапсельга) is the highest point of Leningrad Oblast, and one of the highest points of the Vepsian Upland, standing at 291 m (955 ft) above sea level. Lake Chogozero is located to the northeast of the mountain and its height above sea level is only 42 meters lower. The road along the Oyat leads to the side of the mountain; it is considered difficult even for off-road vehicles. Travelers must walk to the top, as there are many fallen trees around.

== See also ==
- List of highest points of Russian federal subjects
