= Uplands School =

Uplands School may refer to:

== Canada ==
- Uplands Elementary School (Langley), a public elementary school in Langley, British Columbia
- Uplands Elementary School (Terrace), an elementary school in Terrace, British Columbia
- Uplands School (Moncton, New Brunswick), an elementary school in Moncton, New Brunswick

== Malaysia ==
- The International School of Penang (Uplands), a British international school in Penang

== South Africa ==
- Uplands College, est 1928; see White River, Mpumalanga § Education

== United Kingdom ==
- Uplands School, Poole, an independent school in Dorset, England, superseded by Bournemouth Collegiate School
- Uplands School, Swindon, a secondary school for pupils with severe learning difficulties in Swindon, England
- Uplands Academy, a secondary school in Wadhurst, East Sussex, England
- Uplands Primary School, a primary school in Sandhurst, Berkshire, England

== United States ==
- Crystal Springs Uplands School
