= East European Plain =

Vast interior plain east of the North/Central European

Approximate extent of the East European Plain.

The East European Plain (also called the Russian Plain, or historically the Sarmatic Plain) is a vast interior plain extending east of the North European Plain, and comprising several plateaus stretching roughly from 25 degrees longitude eastward. It includes the Volhynian-Podolian Upland on its westernmost fringe, the Central Russian Upland, and, on the eastern border, encompasses the Volga Upland. The plain includes also a series of major river basins such as the Dnieper Lowland, the Oka–Don Lowland, and the Volga Basin. At the southeastern point of the East European Plain are the Caucasus and Crimean mountain ranges. Together with the North European Plain (covering much of Belgium, the Netherlands, Denmark, Germany, and Poland), and covering the Baltic states (Estonia, Latvia, and Lithuania), European Russia, Belarus, Ukraine, Moldova, southeastern Romania, and, at its southernmost point, the Danubian Plain in Northern Bulgaria (including Ludogorie and Southern Dobruja), it constitutes the majority of the Great European Plain (European Plain), the greatest mountain-free part of the European landscape. The plain spans approximately 4,000,000 km^{2} (2,000,000 sq mi) and averages about 170 m (560 ft) in elevation. The highest point of the plain (480 metres (1,574.8 ft)) is in the Bugulma-Belebey Upland, in the Eastern part of the plain, in the elevated area by the Ural Mountains (priyralie).

== Boundaries ==
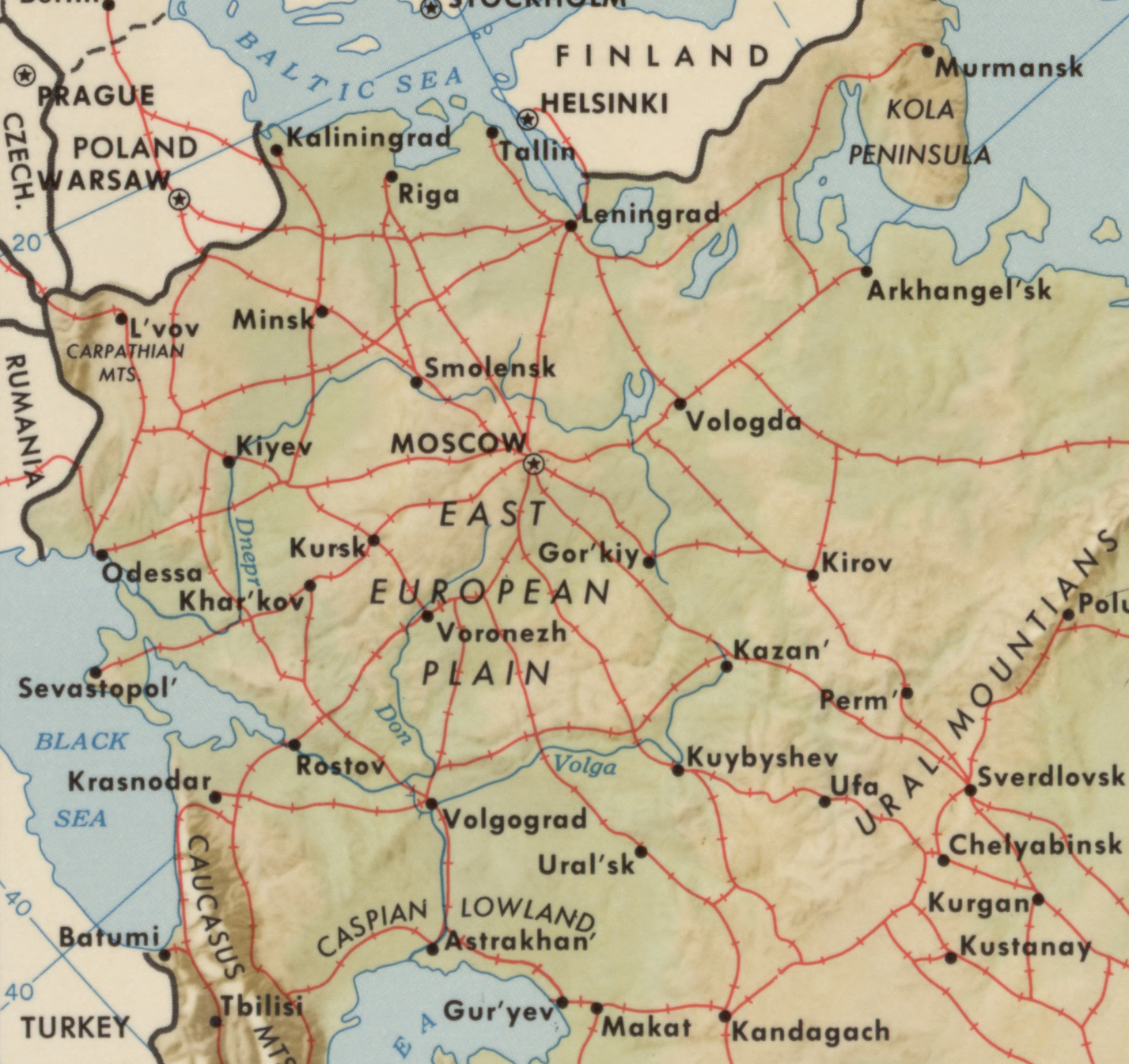
1968 CIA conic map excerpt of the East European Plain within the then-Soviet Union

- West: Baltic Sea, Oder and Lusatian Neisse, Sudetenland, Carpathians (Outer Western Carpathians, Outer Eastern Carpathians, Southern Carpathians, Serbian Carpathians).
- South: Balkan Mountains, Black Sea, Crimean Mountains, Caucasus, The Caspian Sea and the Sea of Azov, Ustyurt Plateau.
- East: Ural Mountains and Turan Depression.
- North: White Sea, Barents Sea, Kara Sea, Scandinavian Mountains.

== Regional subdivisions ==
- Belarus
  - Belarusian Ridge
  - Polesia (Belarus, Ukraine, Poland)
- Bulgaria
  - Danubian Plain (Bulgaria) (southern portion of the Lower Danubian Plane)
- Estonia
- Kazakhstan (European part)
- Latvia
- Lithuania
- Poland
  - Roztocze
  - Mazovian Lowland
- Romania / Moldova
  - Moldavian Plateau (Moldova, Romania, Ukraine)
  - Wallachian Plain (northern portion of the Lower Danubian Plane)
- Russia (European part)
  - Timan Ridge
  - Northern Ridge (Uvaly)
  - Mari Depression
  - Valdai Hills
  - Smolensk–Moscow Upland (Russia, Belarus)
  - Central Russian Upland (Russia, Ukraine)
  - Oka–Don Lowland
  - Volga Upland
  - Obshchy Syrt
  - Caspian Depression
- Ukraine
  - Sian Lowland
  - Volhynian-Podolian Upland
    - Podolian Plateau
  - Polesian Lowland
  - Dnieper Lowland
  - Dnieper Upland
    - Kyiv Mountains
  - Central Upland
  - Black Sea Lowland
  - Azov Upland / Donets Ridge

== Other major landforms ==
The following major landform features are within the East European Plain (listed generally from north to south).

- North Russian Plain
- Baltic Uplands
- Belarusian Ridge
- Kuma–Manych Depression
- Bugulma-Belebey Upland
- Vyatka Uval (Russian: Вятский увал) named after the Vyatka River (uval is a Russian geological term for an elongated elevation with a flat, slightly convex or wavy top and gentle slopes)

== Largest rivers ==
- Volga River
- Danube
- Ural River
- Vistula
- Dnieper River
- Don River (Russia)
- Pechora River
- Kama River
- Oka River
- Belaya River
- Daugava
- Neman River
- Pregolya River

== See also ==
- West Siberian Plain, the other major plain of Russia
- Explorers of Siberia
- Great Russian Regions
