= Uplander =

Uplander or Uplanders may refer to:

- Uplander, another name for a highlander
- Polish Uplanders (disambiguation)
- Chevrolet Uplander, a minivan manufactured and marketed by Chevrolet for the model years of 2005 to 2009

== See also ==
- Upland (disambiguation)
