= Konzhakovskiy Kamen =

Mountain in Sverdlovsk Oblast, Russia

- Конжаковский Камень
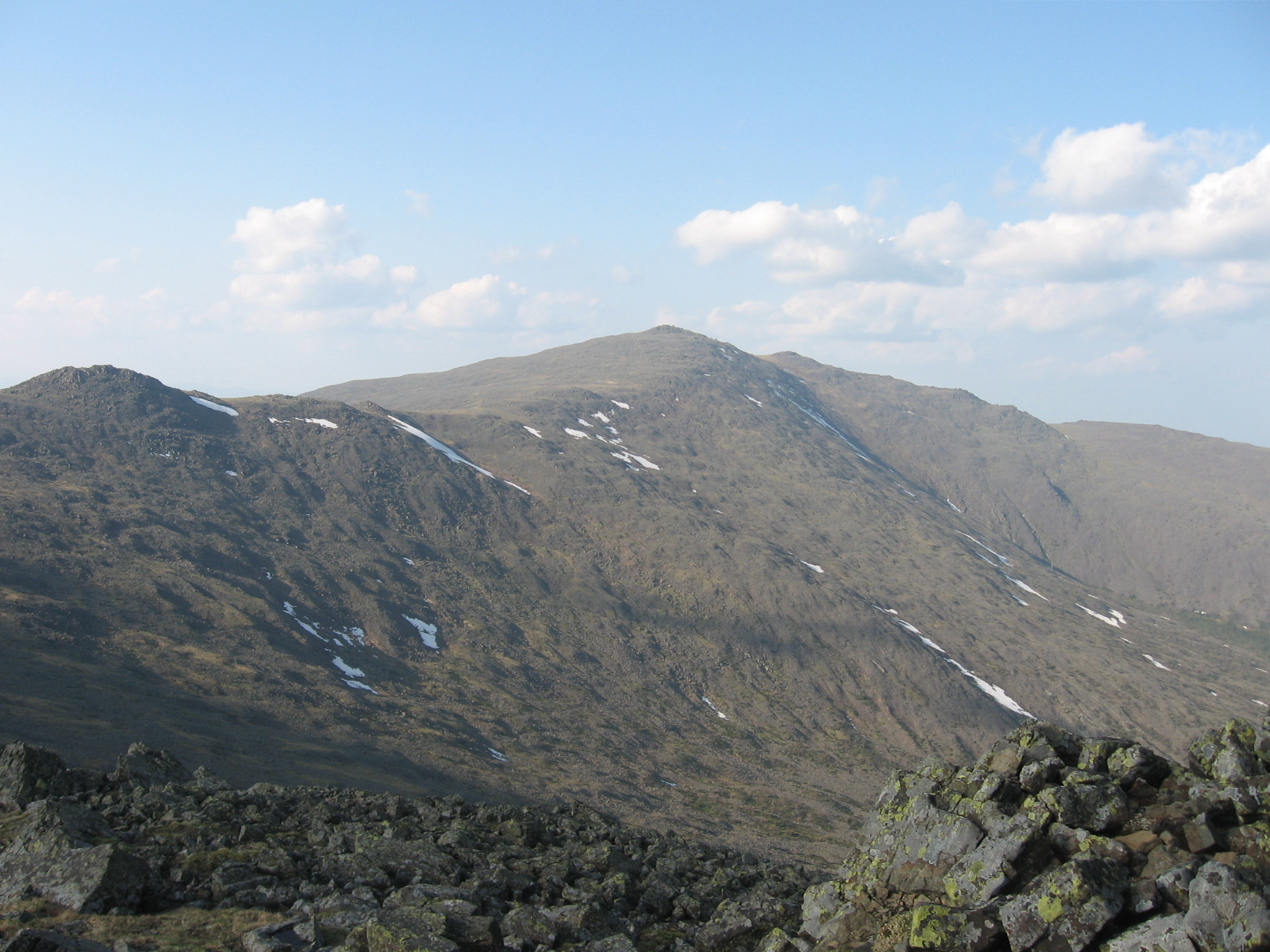

Highest point
- Elevation: 1,569 m (5,148 ft)
- Coordinates: 59°37′N 59°08′E

Geography
- Location within Russia
- Location: Russia
- Parent range: Ural Mountains

Mount Konzhakovskiy Kamen (Russian: Конжаковский Камень) is a mountain in the northern Urals, Sverdlovsk Oblast, Russia.

The Great Soviet Encyclopedia describes Konzhakovskiy as "mountain massif" of height 1,569 m. Its constitution is pyroxenites and dunites of lower and middle Paleozoic era. The slopes are covered with conifers with some birch up to 900–1000 m, with alpine tundra above.

== See also ==
- List of highest points of Russian federal subjects
