= Mount Tsakhvoa =

Mountain in Russia

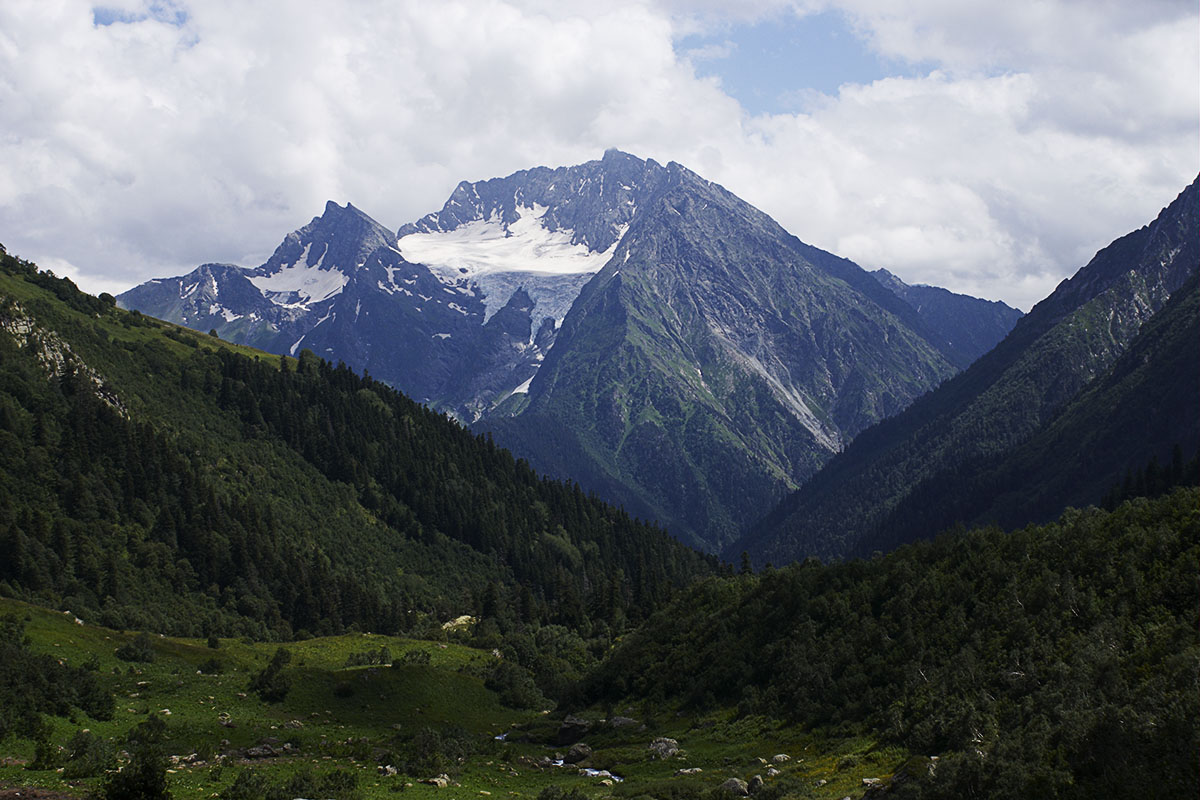
- The peak of Mount Tsakhvoa

Highest point
- Elevation: 3,345.9 m (10,977 ft)
- Prominence: 1,081 m (3,547 ft)
- Listing: Ribu
- Coordinates: 43°40′19″N 40°34′40″E

Naming
- Native name: Цахвоа (Russian)

Geography
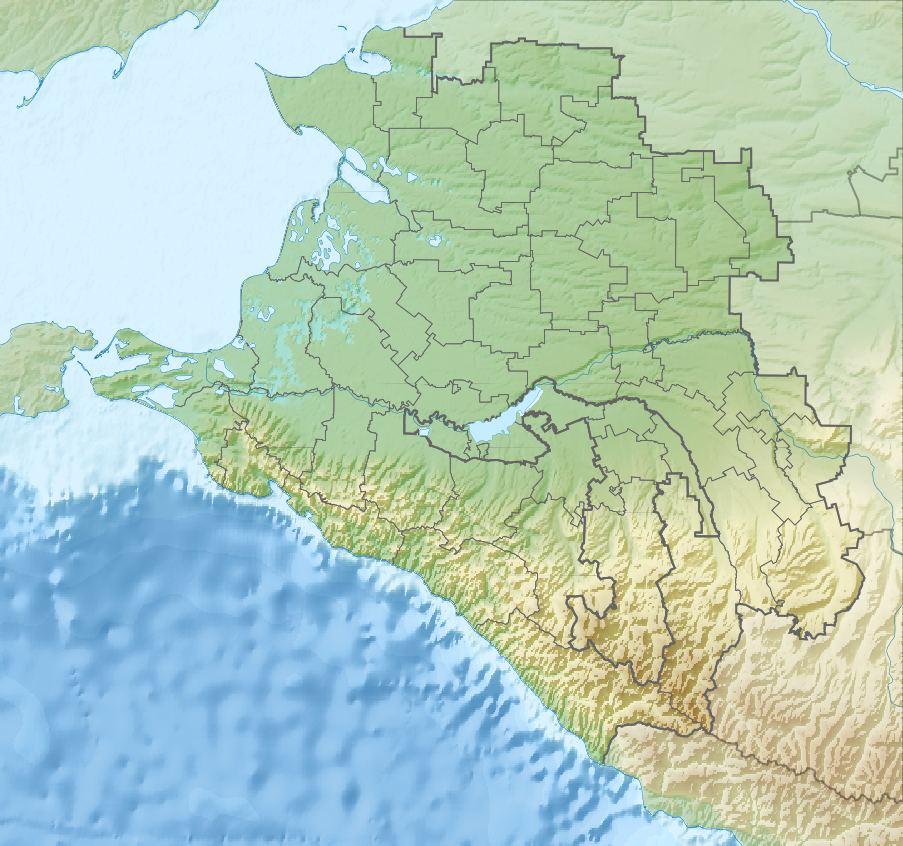
- Location within European Russia Location within Krasnodar Krai
- Location: Krasnodar Krai, Russia
- Parent range: Caucasus

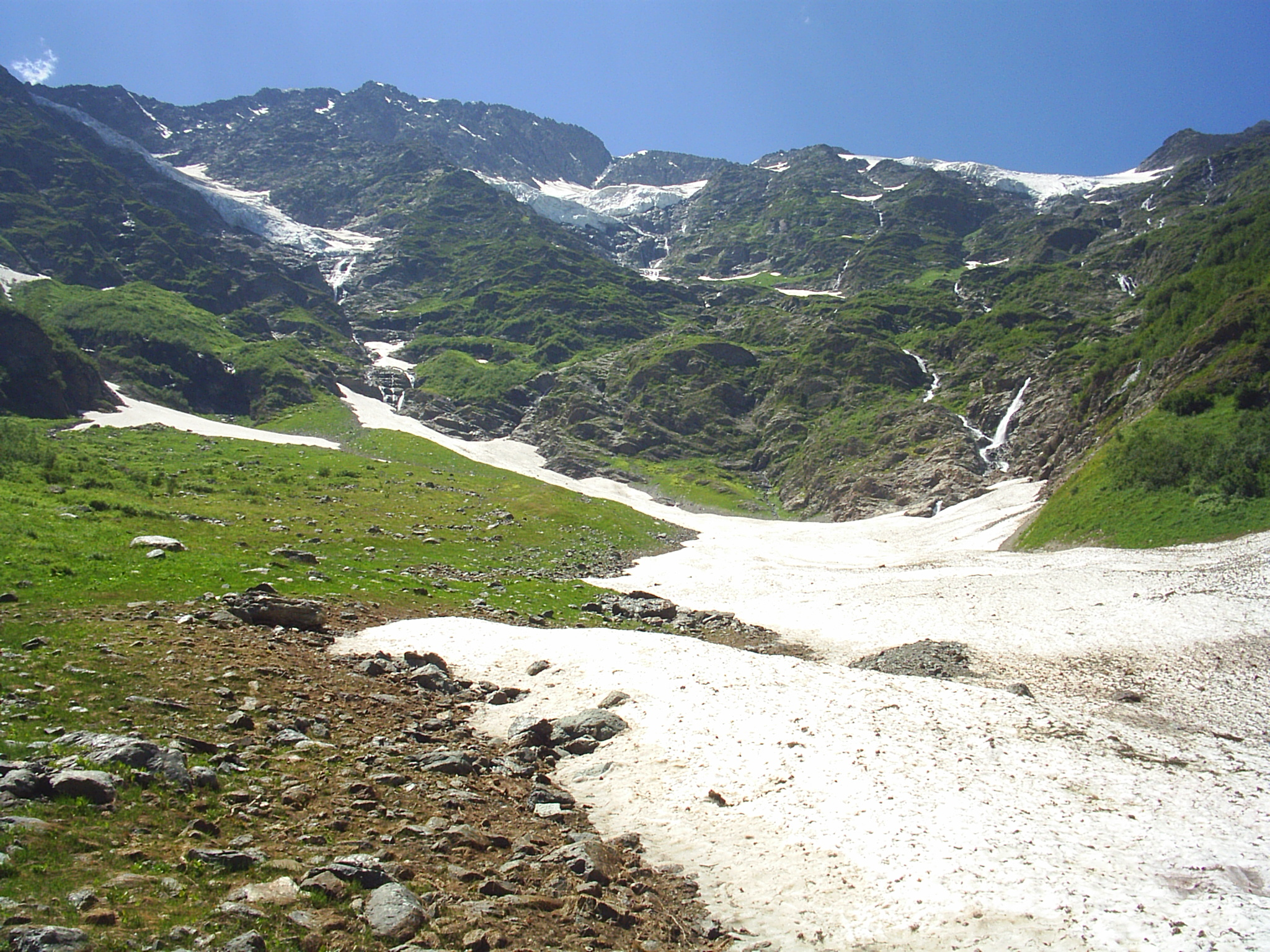
A view of the top of Tsakhvoy from the northeast

Mount Tsakhvoa (Russian: Цахвоа) is a mountain in the Western Caucasus, and is the highest point of Krasnodar Krai, Russia. The height of the summit is 3346 meters above sea level.

On the northern slopes of the mountain is located one of the largest glaciers in the Krasnodar Territory with a total area of about 2,500 square metres (27,000 sq ft), descending the steep slopes with three narrow tongues.

Mount Tsakhvoa enjoys popularity with tourists and climbers.

== See also ==
- List of highest points of Russian federal subjects
