= Vepsian Upland =

Hilly region of the East European Plain in Russia

- Вепсовская возвышенность / Vepsän ülüz
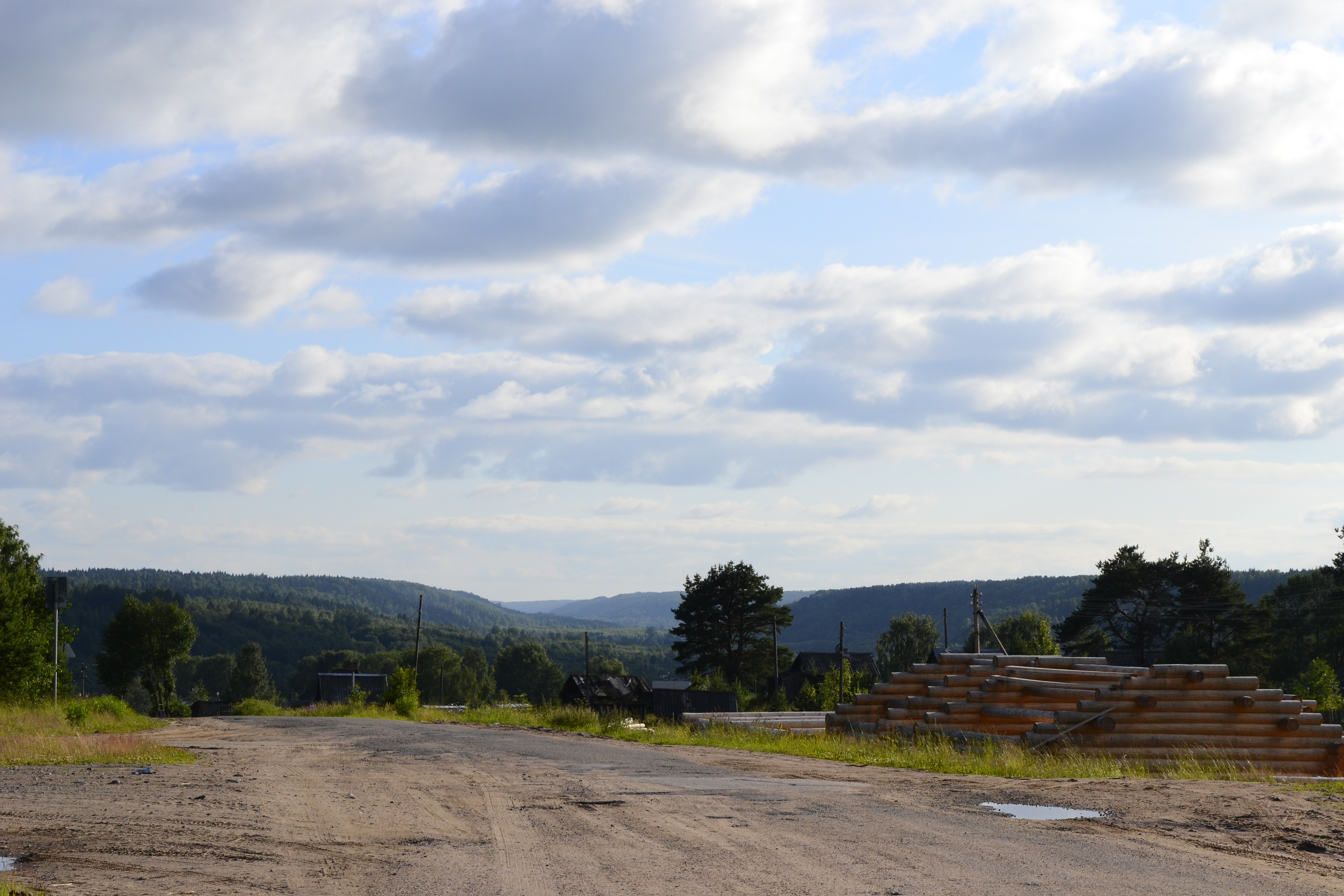
- Panorama of the Vepsian Upland.

Highest point
- Peak: Malgora
- Elevation: 304 m (997 ft)
- Prominence: 141 m (463 ft)
- Coordinates: 60°40′41″N 35°22′43″E

Geography
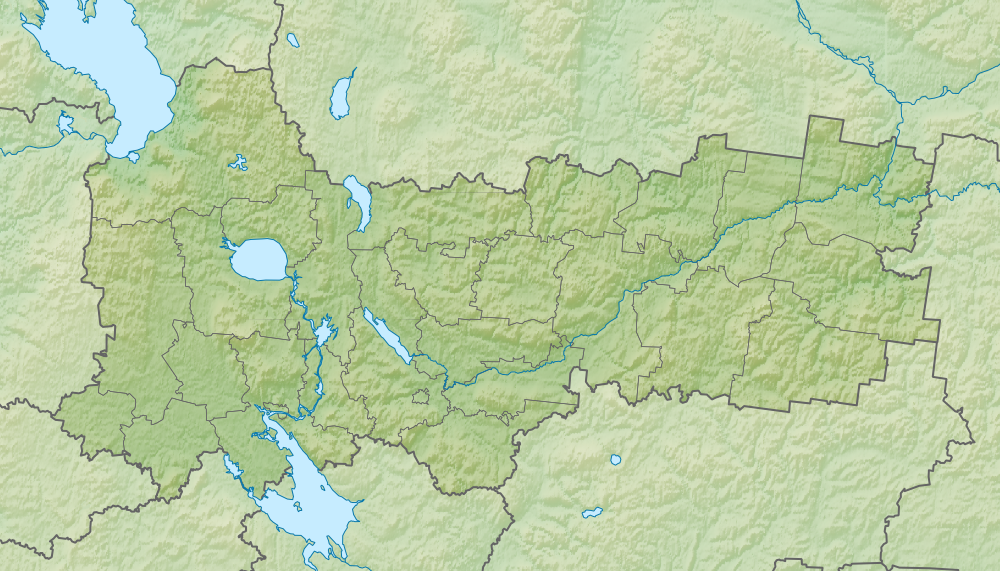
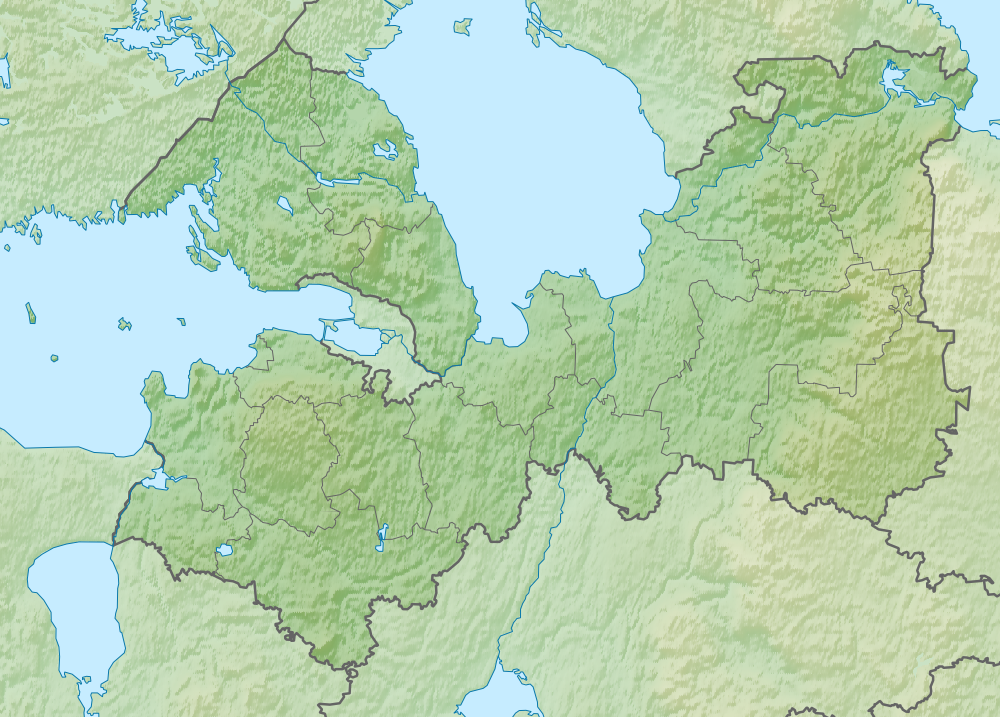
- Location within European Russia Location within Vologda Oblast Location within Leningrad Oblast
- Location: Vologda Oblast, Leningrad Oblast, Russia
- Range coordinates: 60°20′N 35°15′E
- Parent range: East European Plain

Geology
- Rock age: Carboniferous
- Rock type: Limestone

Climbing
- Easiest route: From Vytegorsky District

The Vepsian Upland (Russian: Вепсовская возвышенность, Вепсская возвышенность; Veps: Vepsän ülüz) is a hilly region of the East European Plain located in Vologda Oblast and Leningrad Oblast, Russia. Lake Onega is located to the north.

A 189,100 hectares (467,000 acres) forested sector at the western end of the hills is a protected area under the name Vepsian Forest (Veps: Vepsän mec; Russian: Вепсский лес). It was established in 1999. Lake Shimozero, located in the eastern part of the Vepsian Upland, is also a protected area since 1978.

== Geography ==
The Vepsian hilly area is a northward extension of the Central Russian Upland, in the same manner as the Valdai Hills to the southeast. The south-west / northeast oriented Tikhvin Ridge connects the central part of the Valdai Hills to the Vepsian Upland in its north-eastern part. Together with the Tikhvin Ridge, part of the Valdai Hills, the Vepsian Upland separates the basins of the Baltic and the Caspian Seas.

The upland stretches across Vytegorsky District, in the western part of Vologda Oblast, as well as the Podporozhsky, Boksitogorsky and Tikhvinsky districts of the eastern side of Leningrad Oblast.

The highest point is Malgora hill at 60°40′41″N 35°22′43″E. With a height of 304 metres (997 ft) above sea level, it is also the highest point of Vologda Oblast. Gapselga, the highest point of Leningrad Oblast, reaching 291 metres (955 ft) above sea level, is also located in the Vepsian Upland.

The main rivers of the hill area are the Shoksha, Oyat, Kapsha, Pasha, Tutoka and Yavosma.

== See also ==
- Highest points of Russian Federal subjects
- List of mountains and hills of Russia
- Vepsians § Geography
