= Upland, West Virginia =

Upland, West Virginia may refer to:

- Upland, Mason County, West Virginia, an unincorporated community in Mason County
- Upland, McDowell County, West Virginia, an unincorporated community in McDowell County
