= Krasnodar Krai =

First-level administrative division of Russia

Krasnodar Krai Краснодарский край (Russian)
- Krai
- Flag Coat of arms
- Anthem: Anthem of Krasnodar Krai
- Interactive map of Krasnodar Krai
- Coordinates: 45°22′N 39°26′E
- Country: Russia
- Federal district: Southern
- Economic region: North Caucasus
- Established: September 13, 1937
- Administrative center: Krasnodar

Government
  - Body: Legislative Assembly
  - Governor: Veniamin Kondratyev

Area
  - Total: 75,485 km^{2} (29,145 sq mi)
  - Rank: 42nd

Population (2021 census)
  - Total: 5,838,273 ▲: 87.7% Russians; 3.6% Armenians; 0.5% Ukrainians; 3.1% other; 5% not stated
  - Estimate (2018): 5,603,420
  - Rank: 3rd
  - Density: 77.343/km^{2} (200.32/sq mi)
  - Urban: 56.9%
  - Rural: 43.1%

GDP (nominal, 2024)
  - Total: ₽4.77 trillion (US$56 billion)
  - Per capita: ₽819,069 (US$9,611.12)
- Time zone: UTC+3 (MSK)
- ISO 3166 code: RU-KDA
- License plates: 23, 93, 123, 193, 323
- OKTMO ID: 03000000
- Official languages: Russian
- Website: http://admkrai.krasnodar.ru/

Krasnodar Krai (Note: Russian: Краснода́рский край, romanized: Krasnodarskiy kray, [krəsnɐˈdarskʲɪj kraj]) is a federal subject of Russia (a krai) located in the North Caucasus region in Southern Russia and administratively part of the Southern Federal District. Its administrative center is the city of Krasnodar. The third most populous federal subject in Russia, it had a population of 5,838,273 as of the 2021 Census.

Krasnodar Krai is formally and informally referred to as Kuban (Russian: Кубань), a term denoting the historical region of Kuban situated between the Sea of Azov and the Kuban River, which is predominantly within the krai. It is bordered by Rostov Oblast to the north, Stavropol Krai to the east, Karachay-Cherkessia to the south-east. Adygea is an enclave entirely within the krai. Krasnodar Krai shares an international border with Georgia and the partially-recognized republic of Abkhazia to the south, and borders annexed Crimea to the west, across the Kerch Strait.

The northern part of the krai takes in part of the Don Steppe, while the southern part has a distinctive Mediterranean climate, which has made it a popular tourist destination. Novorossiysk is Russia's main port on the Black Sea, one of the few cities awarded the title of the Hero City, and Sochi was the host of the XXII Olympic Winter Games in 2014. Krasnodar Krai is home to significant infrastructure of the Russian Navy's Black Sea Fleet.

== Geography ==
Federal subjects in the Black Sea-Caspian area
- Yellow is the Southern Federal District and below it is the North Caucasian Federal District (light grey).
- Smaller areas in the north Caucasus are the republics of Karachay-Cherkessia, Kabardino-Balkaria, North Ossetia-Alania, Ingushetia, and Chechnya.

Krasnodar Krai is located in the southwestern part of the North Caucasus and borders Rostov Oblast in the northeast, Stavropol Krai and Karachay-Cherkessia in the east, and the Abkhazia region (internationally recognized as part of Georgia) in the south. The Republic of Adygea is completely encircled by the krai territory. The krai's Taman Peninsula is situated between the Sea of Azov in the north and the Black Sea in the south. In the west, the Kerch Strait separates the krai from the contested Crimean Peninsula, internationally recognised as part of Ukraine but under de facto Russian control. At its widest extent, the krai stretches for 327 kilometers (203 mi) from north to south and for 360 kilometers (220 mi) from east to west.

The krai is split into two distinct parts by the Kuban River, which gave its name to this entire geographic region. The southern, seaward part is the western extremity of the Caucasus range, lying within the Crimean Submediterranean forest complex ecoregion; the climate is Mediterranean or, in the southeast, subtropical. Historically it is known as Circassia. The northern part is a steppe zone which shares continental climate patterns. It is also known as Kuban region.

The Black Sea coast stretches from the Kerch Strait to Adler and is shielded by the Caucasus Mountains from the cold northern winds. Mountains exceed 3,000 meters (9,800 ft) in height, with Mount Tsakhvoa being the highest at 3,346 meters (10,978 ft), with Mount Fisht, at 2,867 meters (9,406 ft), being the Great Caucasus' westernmost peak with a glacier. Numerous small mountain rivers flow in the coastal areas, often creating picturesque waterfalls. Lake Abrau, located in the wine-making region of Abrau-Dyurso, is the largest lake in the northeastern Caucasus region.

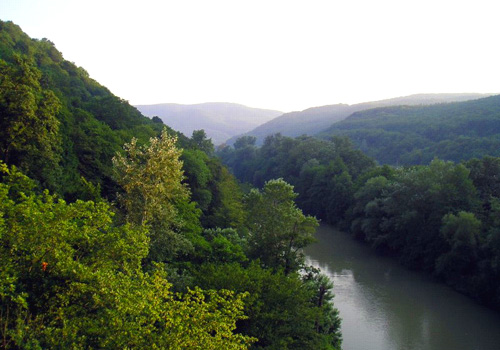
A hilly landscape near Goryachy Klyuch

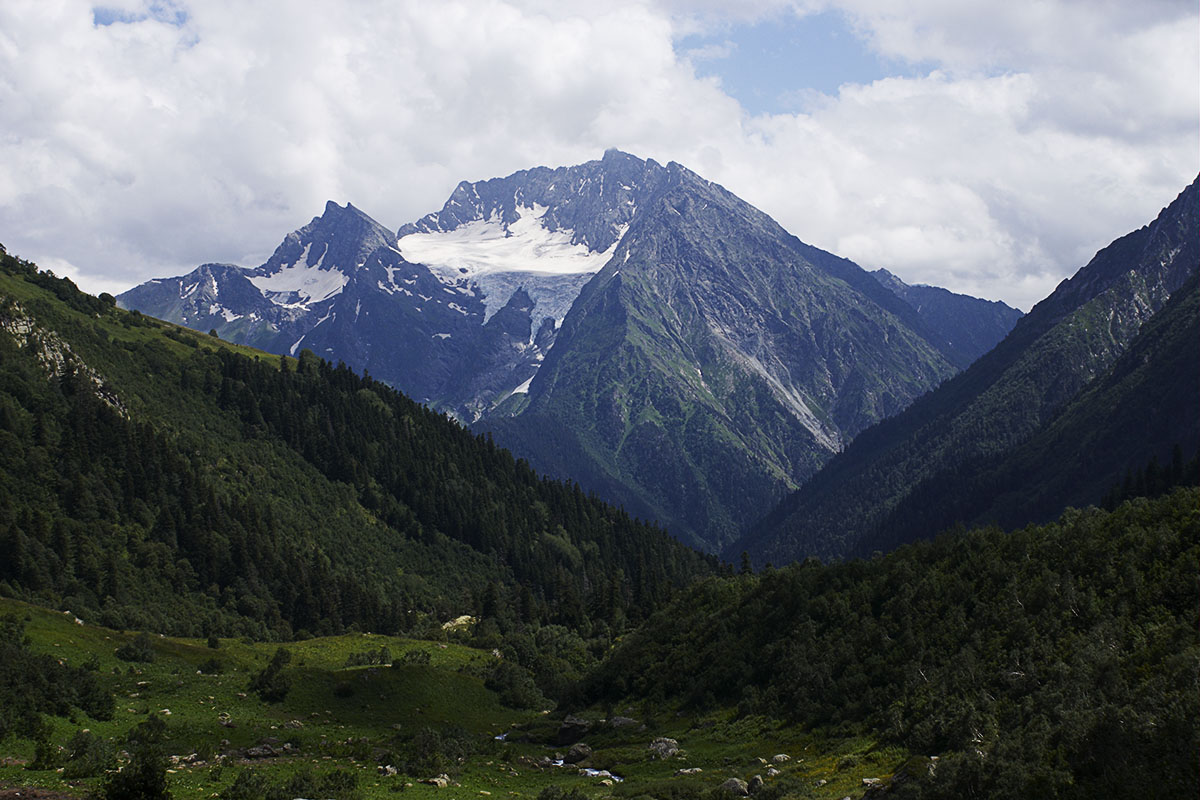
Mount Tsakhvoa, the highest peak in Krasnodar Krai

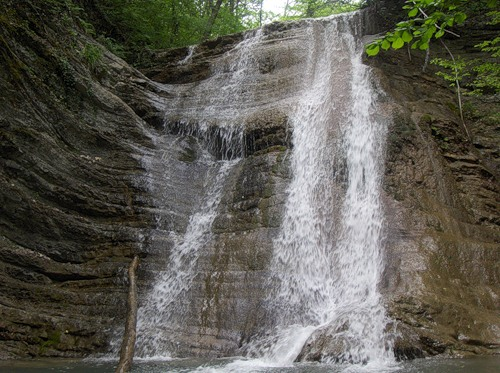
Pshadskiye Waterfalls

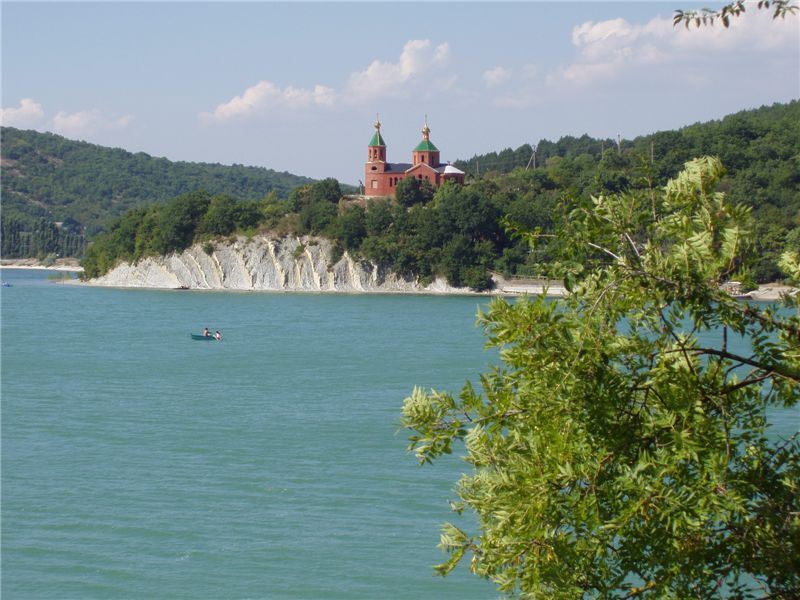
Lake Abrau

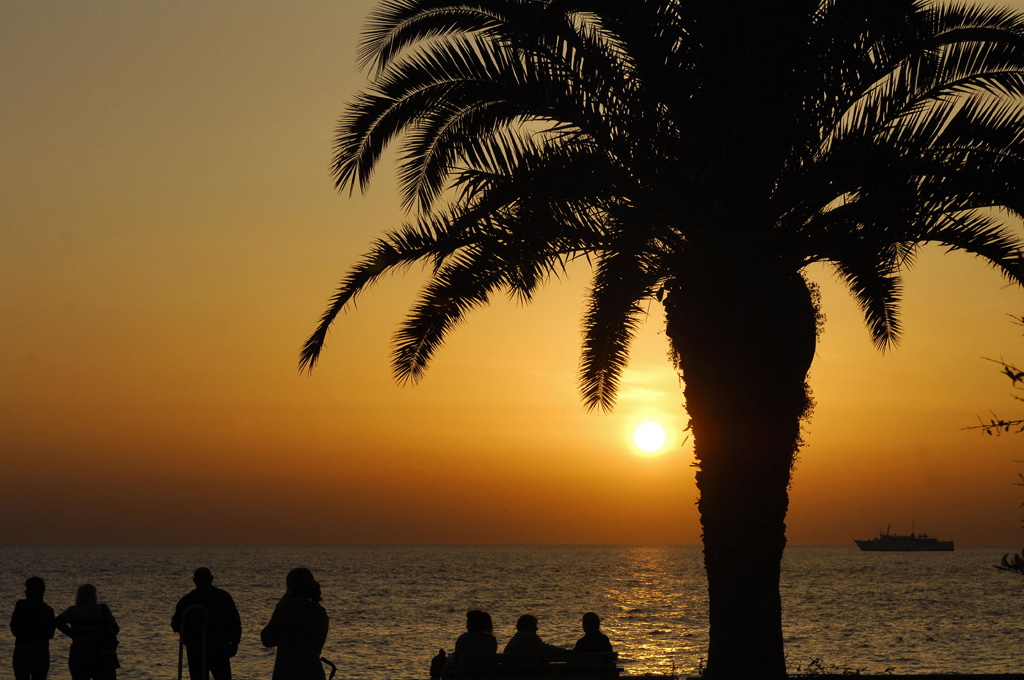
On a beach in Sochi

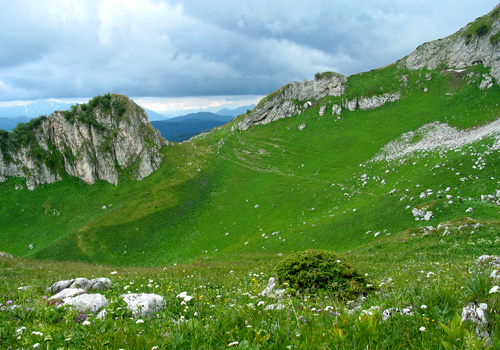
Apsheronsky District

== History ==
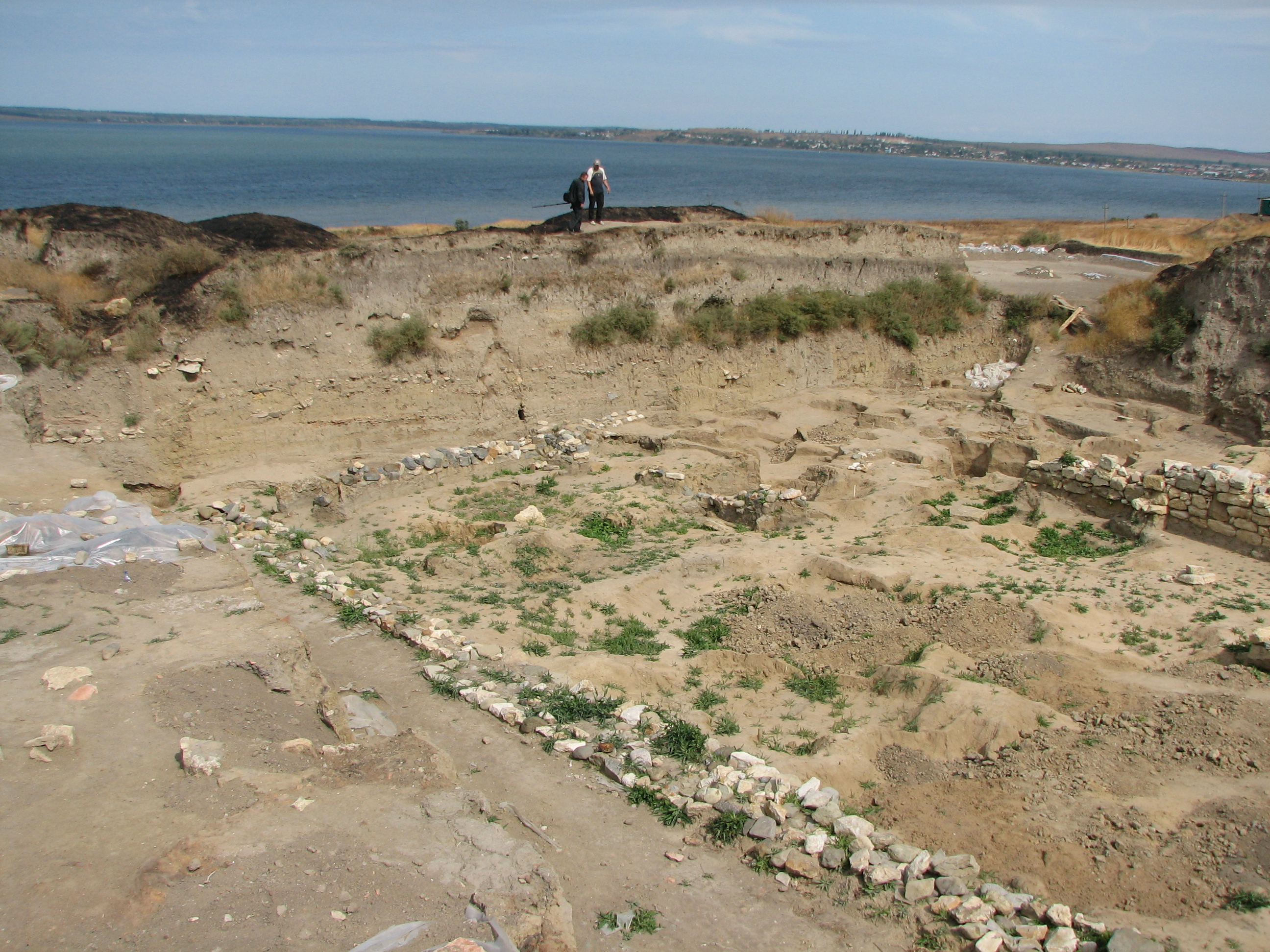
Phanagoria, ancient Greek city and former capital of early medieval Old Great Bulgaria

The region's earliest known inhabitants are referred to, generally, as the Maiōtai, who are the ancestors of the modern-day Circassians, Abkhazians and Abazins (after the Greek name for the Sea of Azov). During the 6th century BC, Pontic Greeks founded the area's first cities, such as Phanagoria (near modern Sennoy) and Hermonassa (on the Taman Peninsula), who traded with nomadic tribes including the Skuthai (Scythians) and Sindi.

In the 7th century, Phanagoria served as the capital of Old Great Bulgaria. From the 8th to the 10th centuries, the area was dominated by the Khazars, a Turkic people who had earlier migrated from the east onto the Pontic-Caspian Steppe, where a hypothesis claims that they converted to Judaism. After the defeat of the Khazar Khanate in 965 Kievan Prince Svyatoslav conquered the area, it came under the rule of Kievan Rus', and it then formed the Tmutarakan principality. Later, due to the increasing claims of the Eastern Roman Empire at the end of the 11th century, the Tmutarakan principality came under the authority of the Eastern Roman Emperors (until 1204).

In that period of history, the Circassians were first mentioned, under the ethnonym Kassogs. For example, the Kassog Prince Rededya was mentioned in The Tale of Igor's Campaign.

In 1243–1438, the current territory of the Kuban was part of the Golden Horde. After the latter's collapse, parts of Kuban were held under the Crimean Khanate, Circassia, and the Ottoman Empire, which dominated the region. The Lesser Nogai Horde was the Nogai Tatar territory in Kuban, allied with the Crimean Khanate. The Tsardom of Russia began to challenge the protectorate of the Ottoman Empire in the area during the Russo-Turkish wars.

Krasnodar Krai

In April 1783, after the liquidation of the Crimean Khanate, right-bank Kuban and Taman Peninsula were annexed to the Russian Empire by decree of Catherine II. In 1792–1794, the Cossacks moved there from Zaporizhzhia, now located in Ukraine, and formed the Black Sea Area troops, with the creation of a solid cordon line for the Kuban River and the marginalization of the neighboring Circassians. The administrative region was accorded the status of "Land of Black Sea Cossack Army", with its center in the city of Yekaterinodar (renamed Krasnodar by the Bolsheviks in 1920).

In 1900, the region's population numbered around two million people. In 1913, the gross grain harvest Kuban region entered second place in Russia, for the production of marketable grain – in first place. During the Russian Civil War, the anti-communist Kuban People's Republic was established on January 28, 1918. It sought union with the Ukrainian People's Republic during its brief independence until Soviet forces occupied the latter in May 1920.

Krasnodar Krai was founded on September 13, 1937, when Azov-Black Sea Krai of the Russian SFSR was split up in Krasnodar Krai and Rostov Oblast. The Greek Autonomous District and Shapsug national district were located within the Krai. On January 30, 1996, Krasnodar Krai signed a power-sharing agreement with the federal government, granting it autonomy. This agreement would be abolished on April 12, 2002.

=== 2012 floods ===
On July 7, 2012, at least 171 people died in Krasnodar Krai, after torrential rains overnight caused the worst flooding and landslides in more than seventy years. Over 280 millimeters (11 in) of rain – the typical amount for a four- or five-month period – was reported to have fallen within forty-eight hours. A local police spokesman stated that most of the dead were in Krymsky District, where at least 159 died when a wave of water 5 meters (16 ft) high swept through the town of Krymsk in the middle of the night. Ten more deaths occurred in Gelendzhik, including five electrocuted when a transformer fell into the floodwater, and two in Novorossiysk. Authorities stated that 17 people had been officially reported missing, and there were fears the death toll would rise further, while medics had hospitalized 210 people, including 16 children.

The regional government claimed that over 24,000 people were affected by the floods, with more than 3,000 evacuated, and that more than 10,000 rescuers and 140 helicopters were searching for victims and evacuating survivors. In Krymsk, 14 temporary shelters were set up to house around 2,000 evacuees. The transport system in the region was said to have collapsed, while oil shipments from Novorossiysk were halted when the port, located in the lower part of the city, was threatened by landslides. Russia's President Vladimir Putin flew to the area to hold emergency talks with officials in Krymsk, while authorities in Perm Krai dispatched a rescue team to evacuate dozens of children from the region, who had been staying at summer camps on the Black Sea coast.

Residents of Krymsk claimed the wave of water that hit the town resulted from the sluice gates of a nearby reservoir being opened, although the prosecutor general's investigative committee denied this. Local prosecutors had earlier confirmed that the gates were opened, but stated that it was too early to determine whether this was the cause of the flooding.

== Politics ==
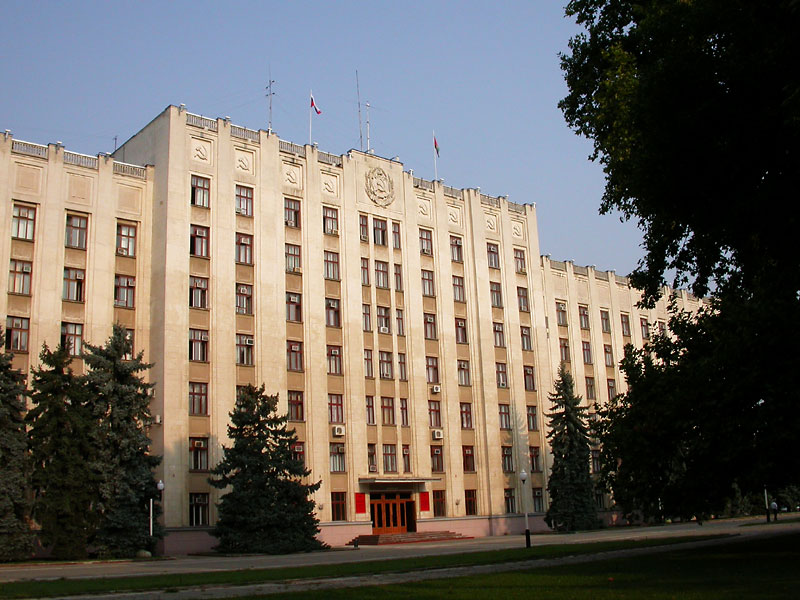
Krai Administration building in Krasnodar

During the Soviet period, the high authority in the krai was shared between three persons: the first secretary of the Krasnodar CPSU Committee (who in reality had the greatest authority), the chairman of the Krai Soviet (legislative power), and the chairman of the Krai Executive Committee (executive power). In 1991, the CPSU lost power, and the head of the krai administration, and eventually the governor have been since appointed/elected alongside elected regional parliament.

The Charter of Krasnodar Krai is the fundamental law of the region. The Legislative Assembly of Krasnodar Krai is the province's standing legislative (representative) body. The assembly exercises its authority by passing laws, resolutions, and other legal acts and by supervising the implementation and observance of the laws and other legal acts passed by it. The highest executive body is the krai government, which includes territorial executive bodies such as district administrations, committees, and commissions that facilitate development and run the day-to-day matters of the province. The krai administration supports the governor's activities, who is the highest official and acts as the guarantor of the observance of the Krai Charter in accordance with the Constitution of Russia.

== Administrative divisions ==
Krasnodar Krai is administratively divided into thirty-eight districts (raions) and fifteen cities of district equivalence. The districts and cities are further subdivided into eleven towns, plus urban-type settlements, and rural okrugs and stanitsa okrugs.

== Economy ==
As a result of 2014 Winter Olympics, Krasnodar Krai has seen significant infrastructure spending. Over $50 billion has been spent on various infrastructure projects including a bullet train.

Large companies in the region include Tander, Novorossmetal, Autonomous Heat Energy Company, Gazprom gas distribution Krasnodar, and Evrokhim Chemical Fertilizers.

Krasnoday Krai's top export is refined petroleum, with other significant exports including wheat, hot-rolled iron bars, seed oils, and asphalt mixtures.

=== Transportation ===
Several lines of Russian Railways cross the region and link it with Abkhazia, Ukraine, and neighboring Russian regions. There are direct trains from resort cities like Sochi and Anapa to Moscow, via Krasnodar, which become very popular during the summer vacation season. There are also suburb train connections. The Apsheronsk narrow-gauge railway, the longest mountain narrow-gauge railway in Russia, runs through Krasnodar Krai.

There are several airports in the region, including Krasnodar International Airport, Sochi International Airport, Anapa Airport, and Gelendzhik Airport.

The biggest ports are Novorossiysk and Tuapse. Others are Eisk and Temryuk on the Azov Sea, and Port Kavkaz, Taman, Anapa, Gelendzhik, and Sochi on the Black Sea. The Crimean Bridge connects Krasnodar Krai and Crimea.

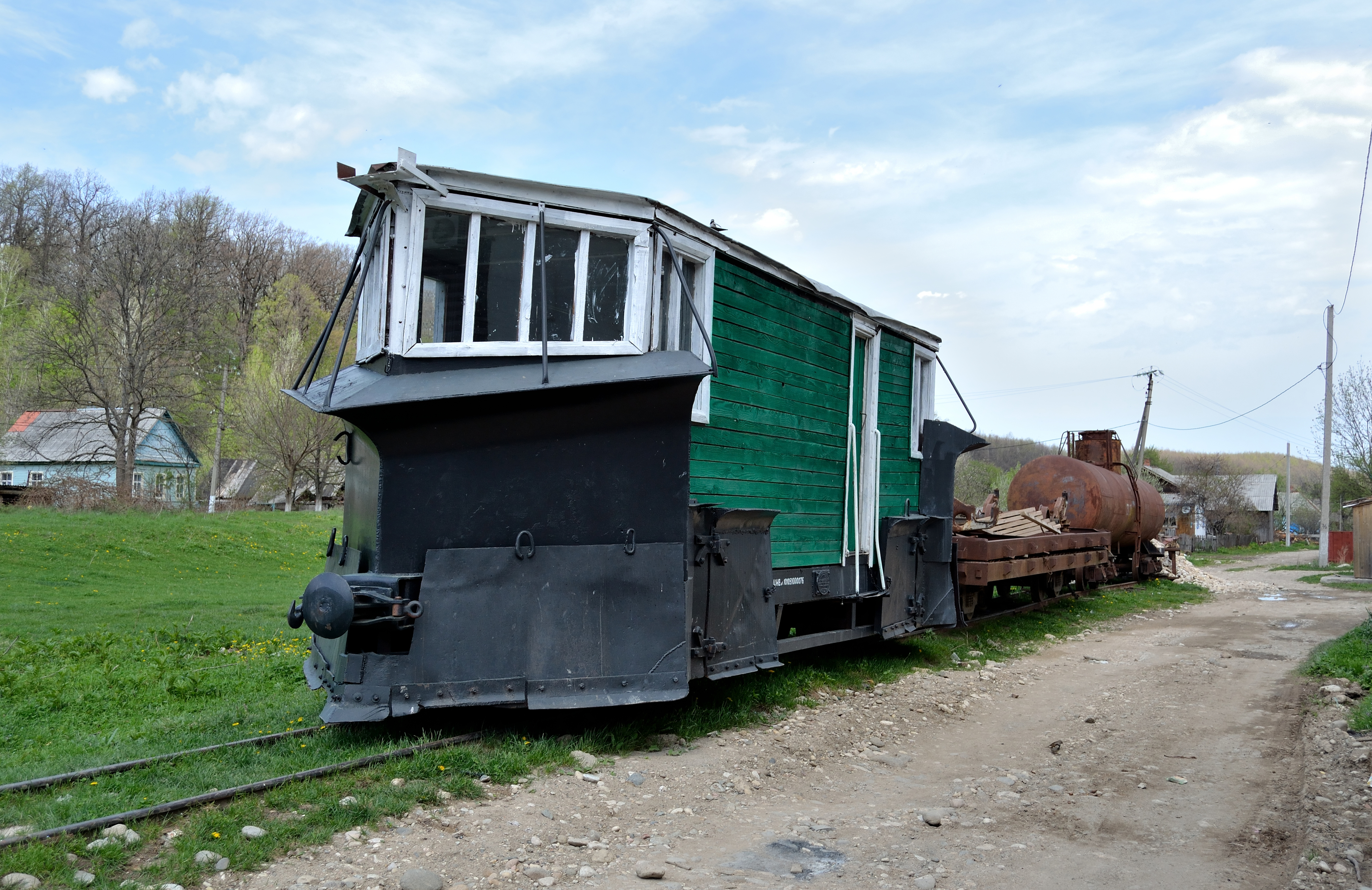
Apsheronsk narrow-gauge railway

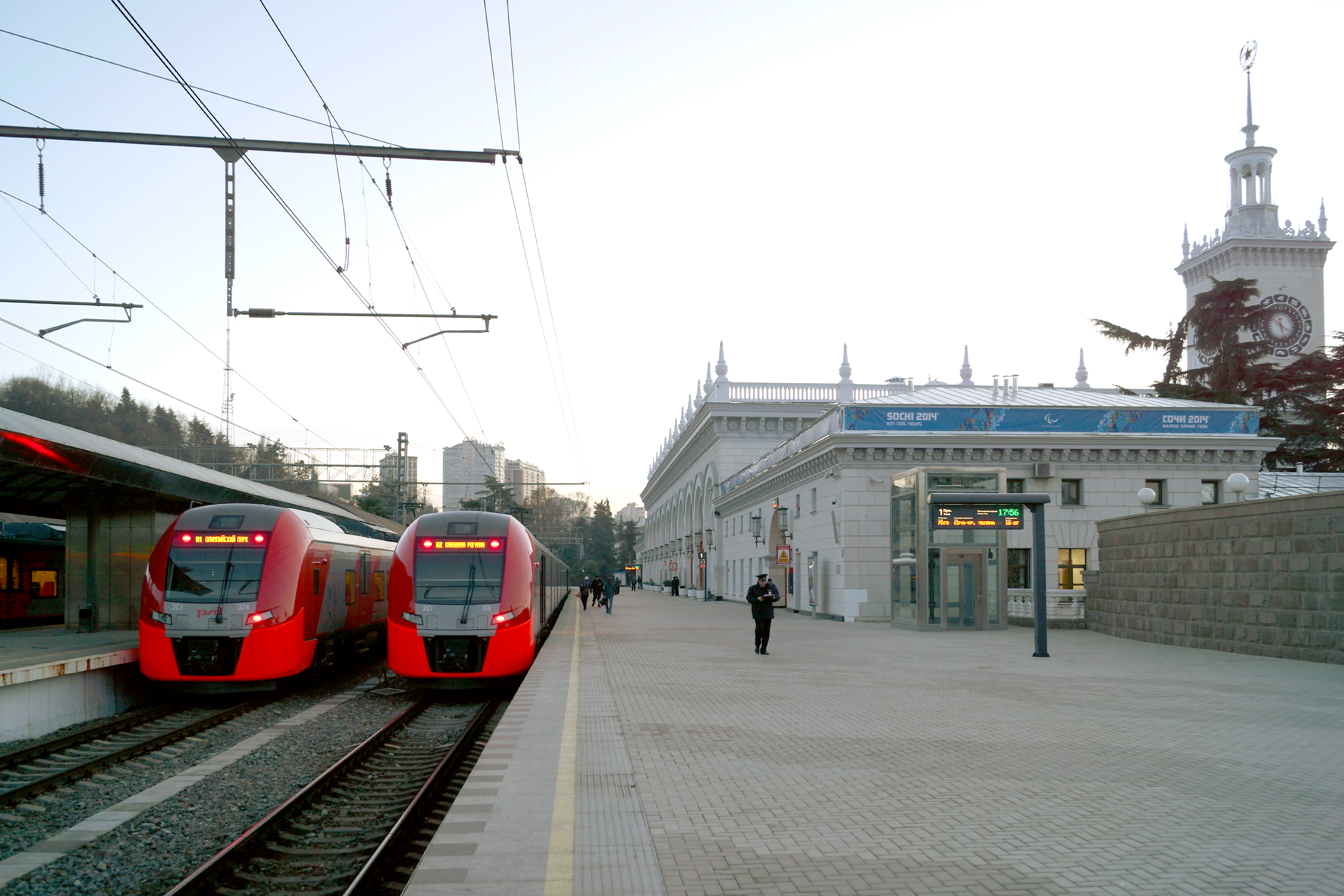
EMU train Lastotschka, Sochi

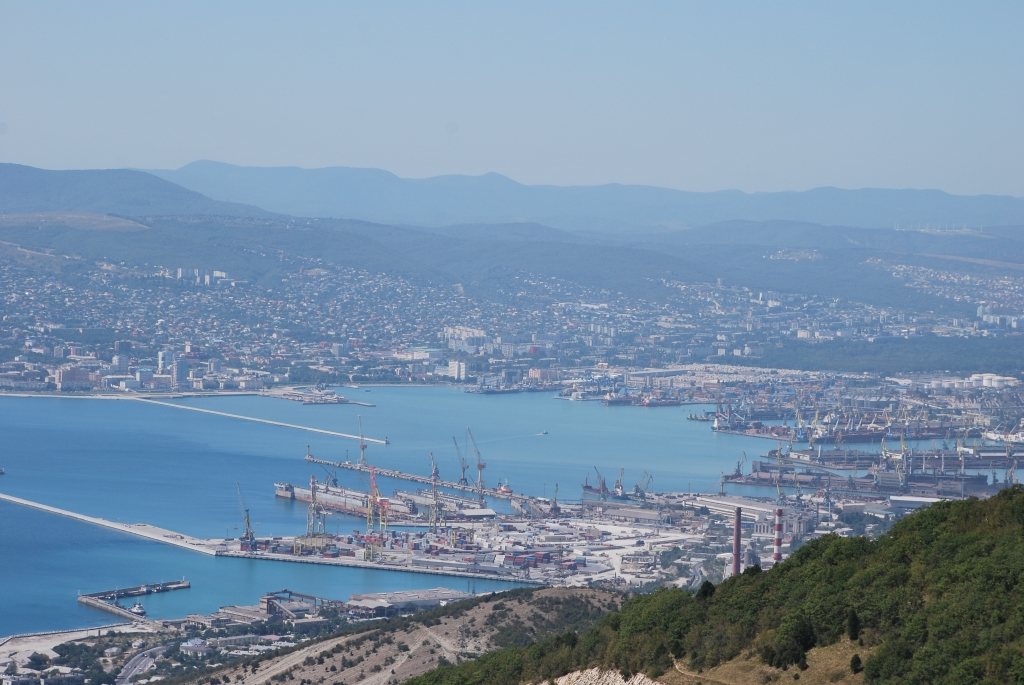
The port of Novorossiysk

== Demographics ==
=== Population ===
5,838,273 (2021 census); 5,226,647 (2010 census); 5,125,221 (2002 census); 5,113,148 (1989 Soviet census).

Historical population
Year	Pop.	±%
1926	2,934,000	—
1959	3,762,499	+28.2%
1970	4,509,807	+19.9%
1979	4,814,835	+6.8%
1989	5,113,148	+6.2%
2002	5,125,221	+0.2%
2010	5,226,647	+2.0%
2021	5,838,273	+11.7%
Source: Census data

Vital statistics for 2024:

- Births: 51,509 (8.8 per 1,000)
- Deaths: 73,705 (12.7 per 1,000)

Total fertility rate (2024):
1.51 children per woman

Life expectancy (2021):
Total — 70.53 years (male — 66.08, female — 74.90)

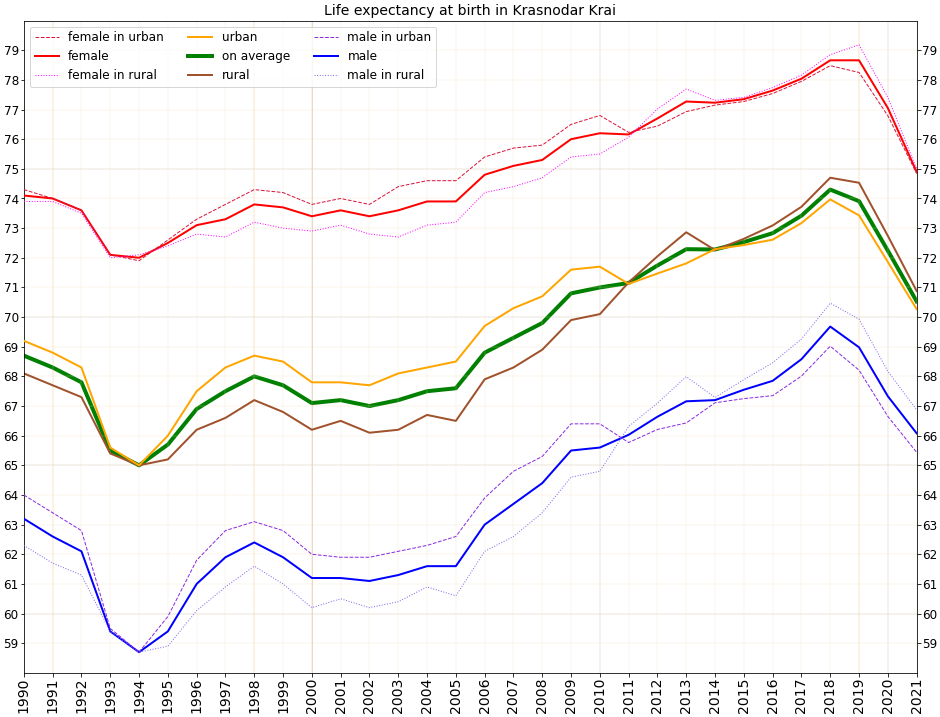
Life expectancy at birth in Krasnodar Krai

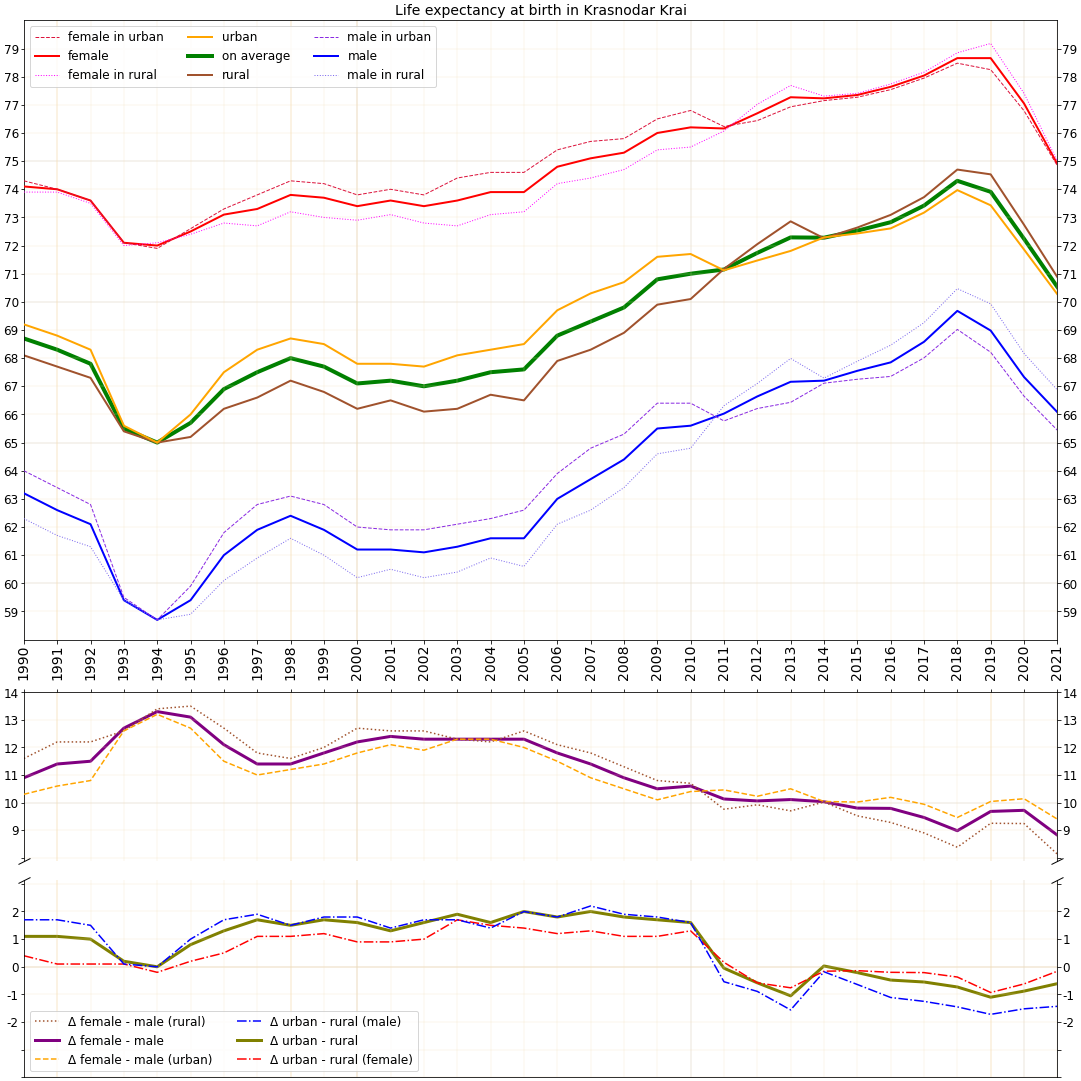
Life expectancy with calculated differences

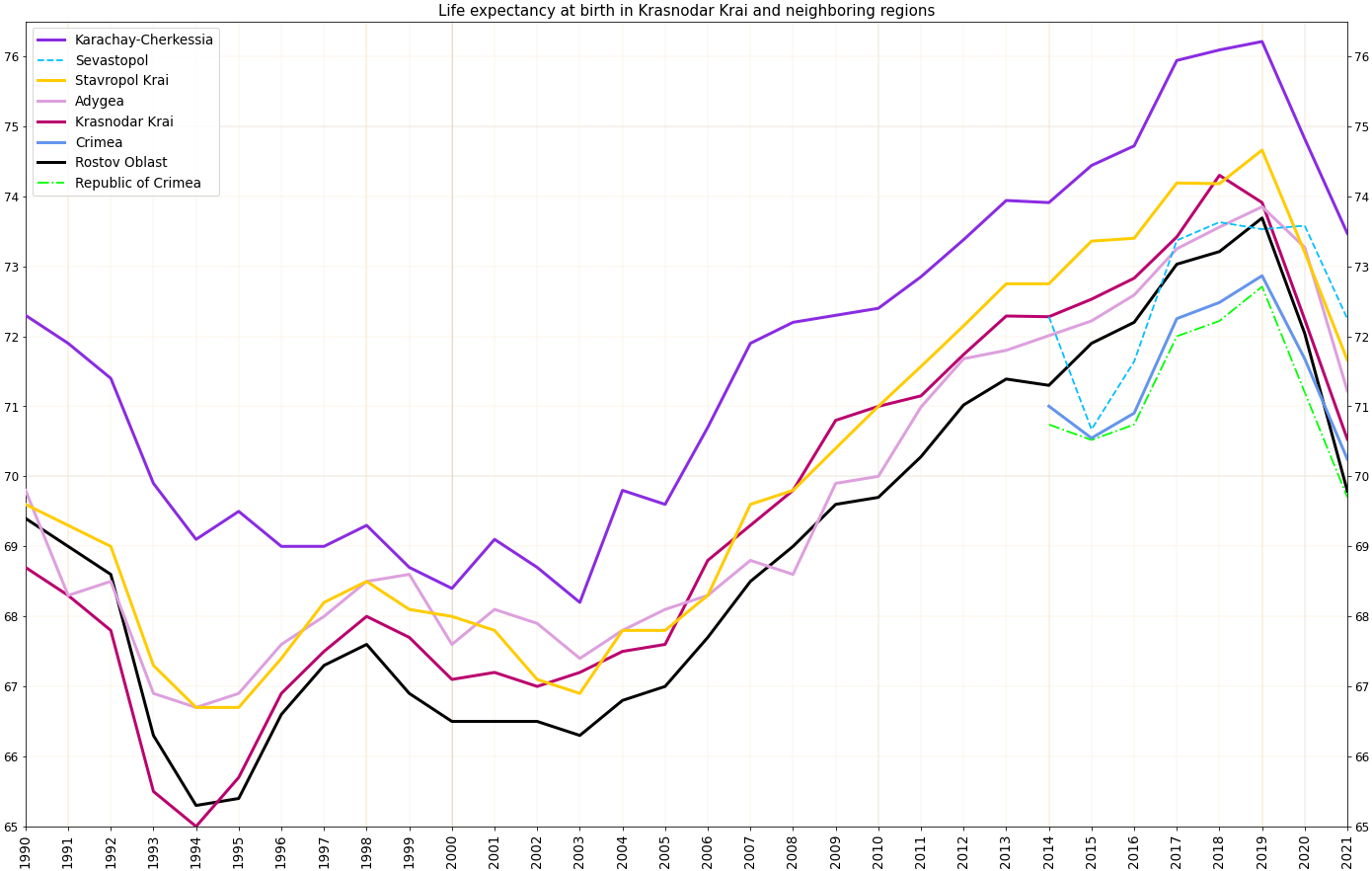
Life expectancy in Krasnodar Krai and neighboring regions

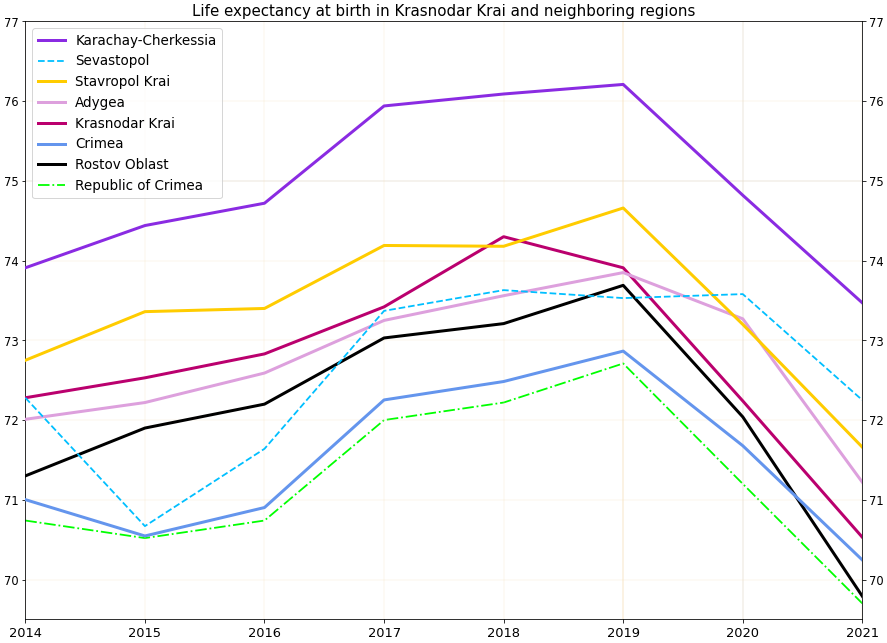
Zoomed version of the chart since 2014

=== Settlements ===
Largest cities or towns in Krasnodar Krai 2021 Russian Census
Rank		Administrative Division	Pop.
1	Krasnodar	City of krai significance of Krasnodar	1,099,344
2	Sochi	City of krai significance of Sochi	466,078
3	Novorossiysk	City of krai significance of Novorossiysk	262,293
4	Armavir	City of krai significance of Armavir	187,177
5	Yeysk	Town of krai significance of Yeysk	82,943
6	Anapa	Town of krai significance of Anapa	81,863
7	Gelendzhik	Town of krai significance of Gelendzhik	80,204
8	Kropotkin	Town of krai significance of Kropotkin	75,858
9	Slavyansk-na-Kubani	Town of krai significance of Slavyansk-na-Kubani	62,985
10	Tuapse	Town of krai significance of Tuapse	61,571

The population of Krasnodar Krai is concentrated in the Kuban River drainage basin, which was traditionally Cossack land (see History of Cossacks). The Kuban Cossacks are now generally considered to be ethnic Russians, even though they are still an important minority in their own right in the area. Many Kuban Cossacks#National identity have considered themselves Ukrainian and reported their language as Ukrainian in censuses well into the 20th century (see Kuban Cossacks).

Other notable ethnic groups include the Adyghe, who are the region's indigenous population and were nearly annihilated and displaced following the Circassian genocide,and the Armenians (including Christian Hamsheni and Cherkesogai).

=== Ethnic groups ===
The 2021 Census identified ethnic groups, as shown in the following table:

Ethnic group	1926 Census		1939 Census		1959 Census		1979 Census		1989 Census		2002 Census		2010 Census		2021 Census	
Ethnic group	Number	%	Number	%	Number	%	Number	%	Number	%	Number	%	Number	%	Number	%
Russians	1,358,996	46.67	2,754,027	86.80	3,163,219	91.54	3,873,463	89.29	4,006,811	86.71	4,436,272	86.55	4,522,962	86.55	5,121,482	87.72
Armenians	77,751	2.67	60,501	1.91	75,163	2.18	114,438	2.64	171,757	3.72	274,566	5.36	281,680	5.39	211,132	3.62
Ukrainians	1,418,820	48.72	149,874	4.72	137,604	3.98	156,500	3.61	182,128	3.94	131,774	2.57	83,746	1.60	29,317	0.50
Tatars					5,036	0.15	19,093	0.44	14,547	0.31	25,589	0.50	24,840	0.48	18,912	0.32
Caucasus Greeks			42,568	1.34	11,989	0.35	20,650	0.48	28,337	0.61	26,540	0.52	22,595	0.43	13,117	0.22
Georgians					5,128	0.15	8,085	0.19	12,105	0.26	20,500	0.40	17,826	0.34	12,451	0.21
Gypsies					4,428	0.13	6,499	0.15	8,186	0.18	10,873	0.21	12,920	0.25	11,590	0.20
Adyghe			64,177	2.02	10,384	0.30	16,584	0.38	20,795	0.45	15,821	0.31	13,834	0.26	10,484	0.18
Azerbaijanis					1,264	0.04	2,806	0.06	10,343	0.22	11,944	0.23	10,165	0.19	8,804	0.15
Turks							267	0.01	2,119	0.05	13,496	0.26	8,527	0.16	8,070	0.14
Circassians					2,213	0.06	3,849	0.09	3,562	0.08	4,446	0.09	5,258	0.10	6,166	0.11
Belarusians	23,302	0.80					29,789	0.69	34,688	0.75	26,260	0.51	16,890	0.32	5,923	0.10
Russian Germans	33,041	1.13	34,287	1.08	4,510	0.13	22,849	0.53	29,946	0.65	18,469	0.36	12,171	0.23	5,678	0.10
Kurds							537	0.01	2,262	0.05	5,022	0.10	5,899	0.11	5,609	0.10
Other ethnicities			67,240	2.12	34,465	1.00	62,434	1.44	93,284	2.02	90,622	1.77	85,121	1.63	77,389	1.33
Ethnicity not stated					23	0.00	4	0.00	6	0.00	13,190	0.26	101,657	1.95	292,149	5.00

Historical population

Year	Pop.	±%
1990	4,638,102	—
1991	4,690,810	+1.1%
1992	4,763,741	+1.6%
1993	4,864,010	+2.1%
1994	4,940,794	+1.6%
1995	5,020,837	+1.6%
1996	5,076,003	+1.1%
1997	5,114,523	+0.8%
1998	5,128,485	+0.3%
1999	5,130,451	+0.0%

Year	Pop.	±%
2000	5,133,449	+0.1%
2001	5,132,798	−0.0%
2002	5,125,221	−0.1%
2003	5,119,857	−0.1%
2004	5,106,259	−0.3%
2005	5,100,250	−0.1%
2006	5,096,572	−0.1%
2007	5,101,081	+0.1%
2008	5,121,799	+0.4%
2009	5,141,852	+0.4%

Year	Pop.	±%
2010	5,226,647	+1.6%
2011	5,229,998	+0.1%
2012	5,284,464	+1.0%
2013	5,330,181	+0.9%
2014	5,404,273	+1.4%
2015	5,453,329	+0.9%
2016	5,513,804	+1.1%
2017	5,570,945	+1.0%
2018	5,603,420	+0.6%
2019	5,648,235	+0.8%

=== Religion ===
Religion in Krasnodar Krai as of 2012 (Sreda Arena Atlas)
Russian Orthodoxy	52.2%
Other Orthodox	0.9%
Old Believers	0.5%
Other Christians	3.5%
Islam	1.3%
Spiritual but not religious	22.5%
Atheism and irreligion	13.2%
Other and undeclared	5.9%

According to a 2012 survey 52.2% of the population of Krasnodar Krai adheres to the Russian Orthodox Church, 3% are unaffiliated generic Christians, 1% are either Orthodox Christian believers who do not belong to church or members of non-Russian Orthodox churches, and 1% are Muslims. In addition, 22% of the population declares to be "spiritual but not religious", 13% is atheist, and 7.8% follows other religions or did not give an answer to the question.
