= Wieżyca (hill) =

Hill in Poland

Coordinates: 54°14′N 18°08′E

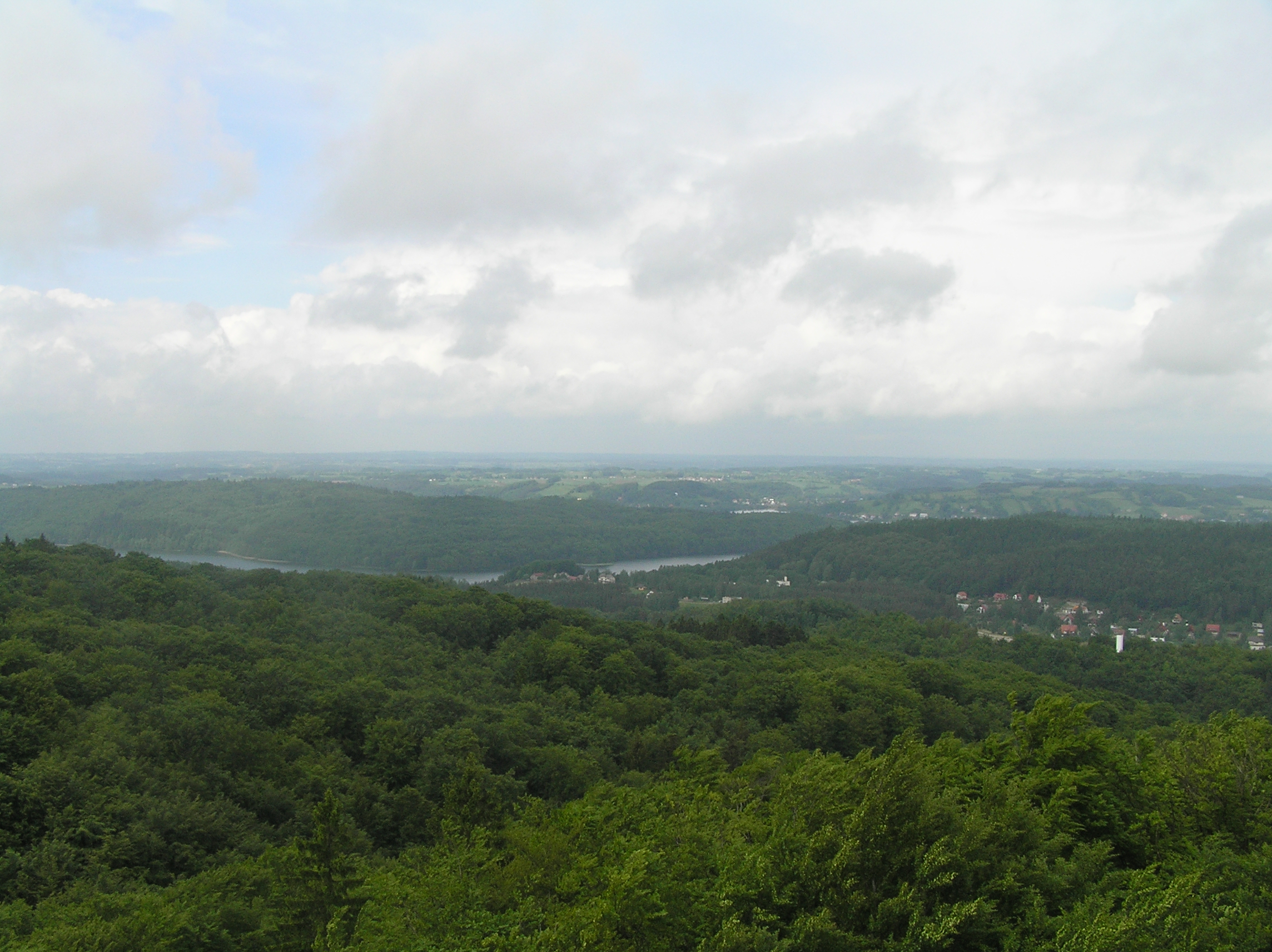
View from observation tower located at the top of the hill

Wieżyca (Kashubian: Wieżëca; German: Turmberg) is a hill located in northern Poland, in the historical region of Kashubia, some 40 kilometers southwest of Gdańsk. With elevation of 329 metres above sea level, it is the highest peak of central and northern Poland. Its top is covered by a forest, and the hill was the object of pagan cult of ancient Slavs. Wieżyca is a popular tourist area, with a ski lift and a ski slope.

== See also ==
- Geography of Poland
