= Belarusian Ridge =

Coordinates: 53°52′26″N 26°59′09″E

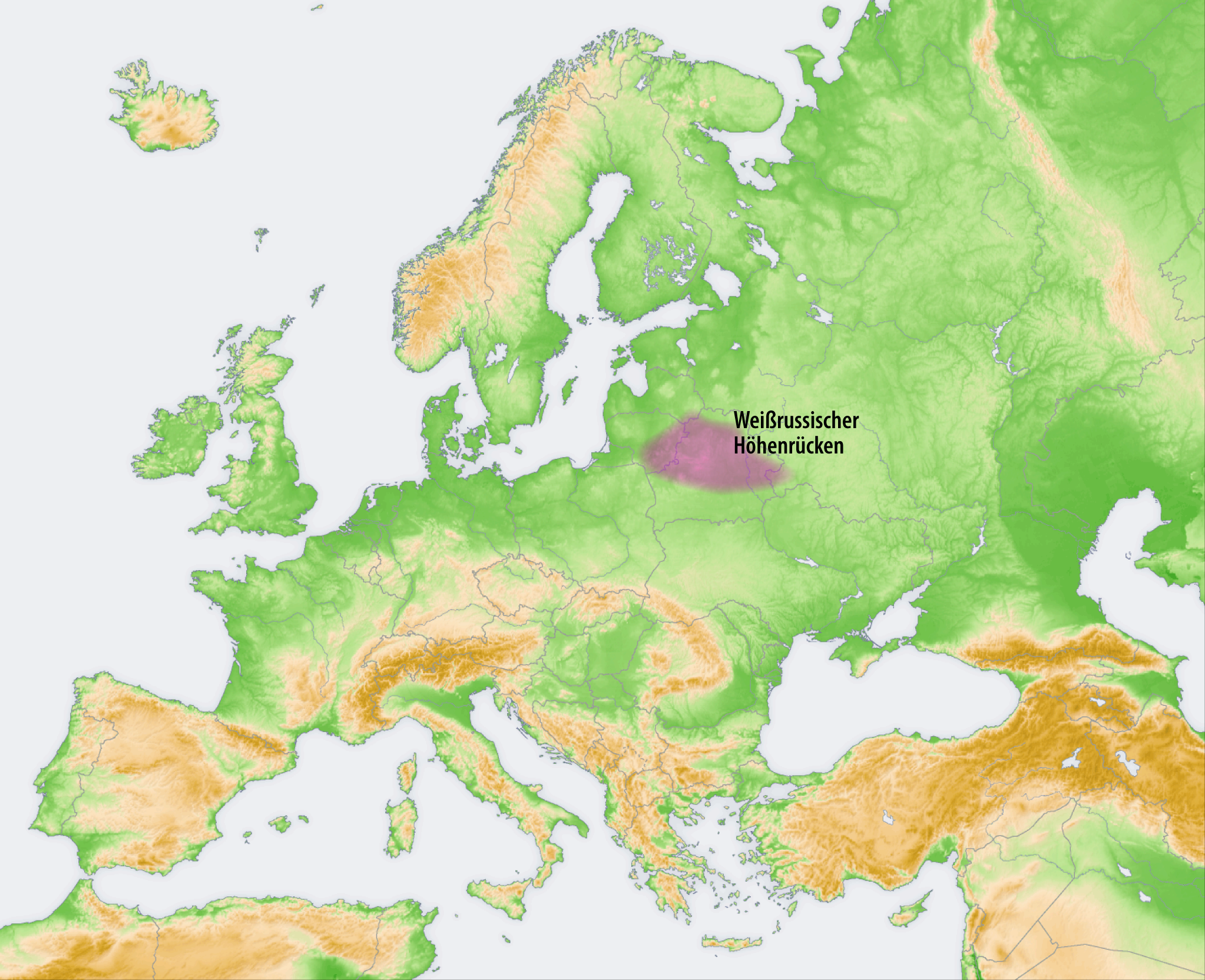
Belarusian Ridge on a European map

The Belarusian Ridge (Belarusian: Беларуская града, romanized: Bielaruskaja hrada) is a line of terminal moraines, which is almost entirely in the northwest of Belarus. The feature is part of the East European Plain.

This ridge, consisting of low, rolling hills, runs for about 500 km in the direction from west-southwest to east-northeast, from the area of the Brest region, which is close to the border of Poland to the Russian town of Smolensk.

The ridge is a limit of the last advance of the ice sheet, which defines its geological constitution: mostly moraine loams with added glacial and alluvial sediments.

River valleys divide the ridge into sections, uplands.

The ridge stretches approximately from west to east and separated two major lowlands: Polesie Lowland to the south and Neman Lowland and Polatsk Lowland to the north.

== Features within Belarus ==
- Ashmyany upland
- Grodno upland
- Vaukavysk upland
- Shchara valley
- Navahradak upland
- Neman River valley
- Minsk upland
- Berezina valley
- Daugava and Vitsebsk-Nevel uplands
- Dnieper upland
- Orsha upland
- a final group of uplands along the eastern boundary with Russia

The highest elevation of the ridge (and the whole Belarus) is Mount Dzyarzhynskaya, 345m.

== Features elsewhere ==
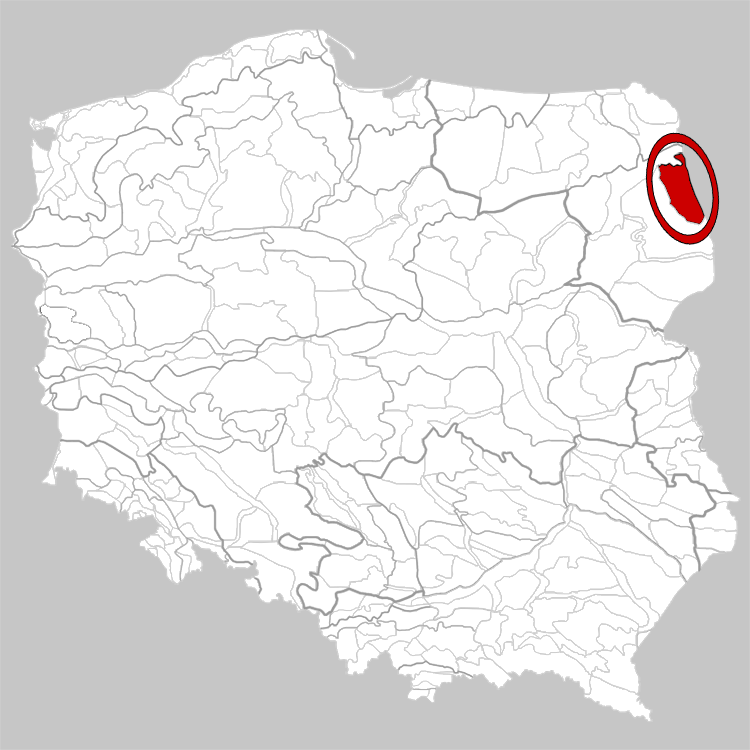
Wzgórza Sokólskie

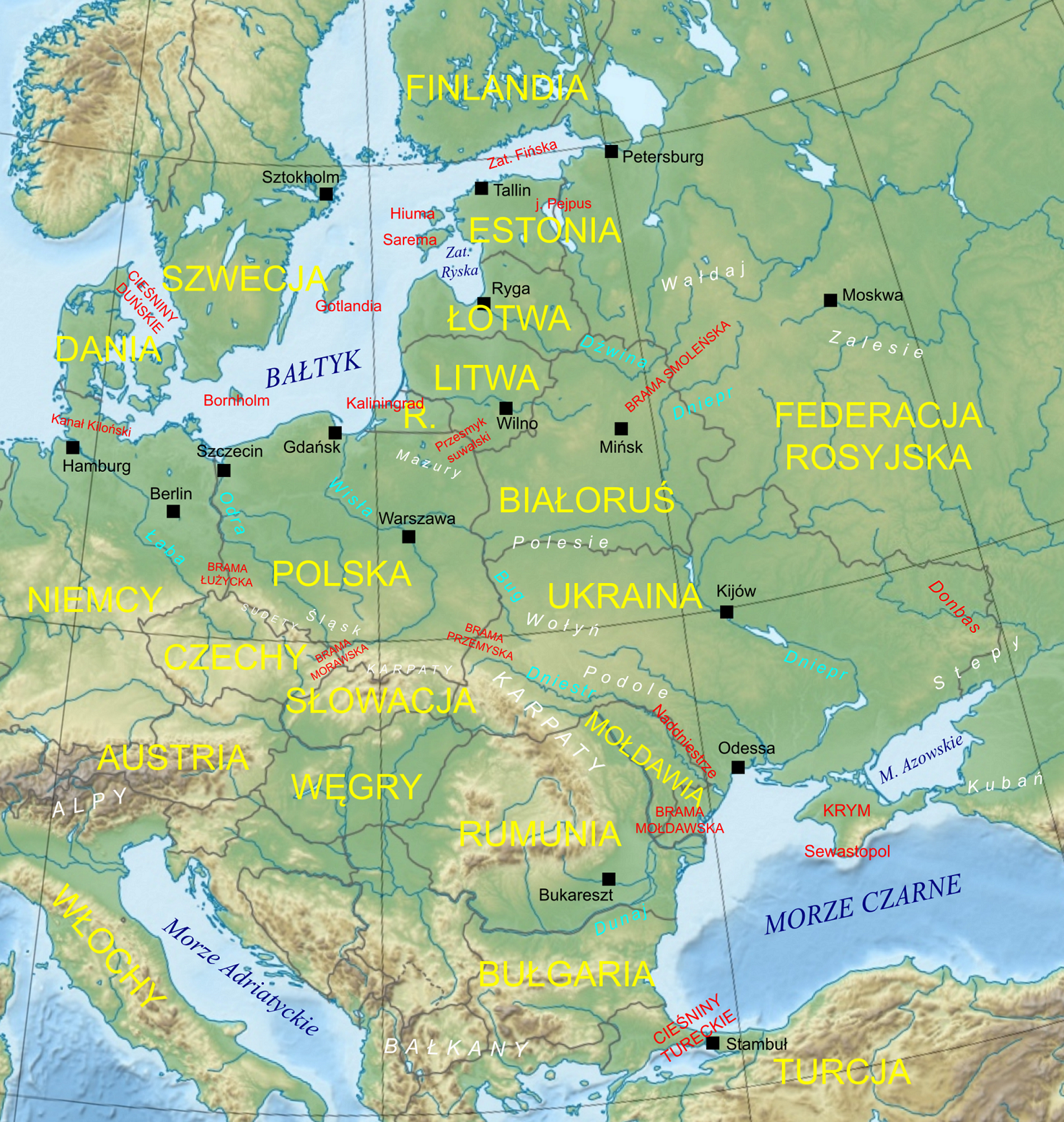
Geostrategic map of Central Europe with Smolensk Gate (Brama Smolenska) marked in the center

The part of the Grodno upland within Poland is called Wzgórza Sokólskie, of area about 1,300sq.km.

A small patch in the north belongs to Lithuania

To the east it connects to the Smolensk–Moscow Upland, Russia via a narrow corridor called the Smolensk Gate between swampy areas of Dnieper and Dvina river systems, of strategic military significance.
