= Smolensk–Moscow Upland =

Coordinates: 55.64°N 34.60°E

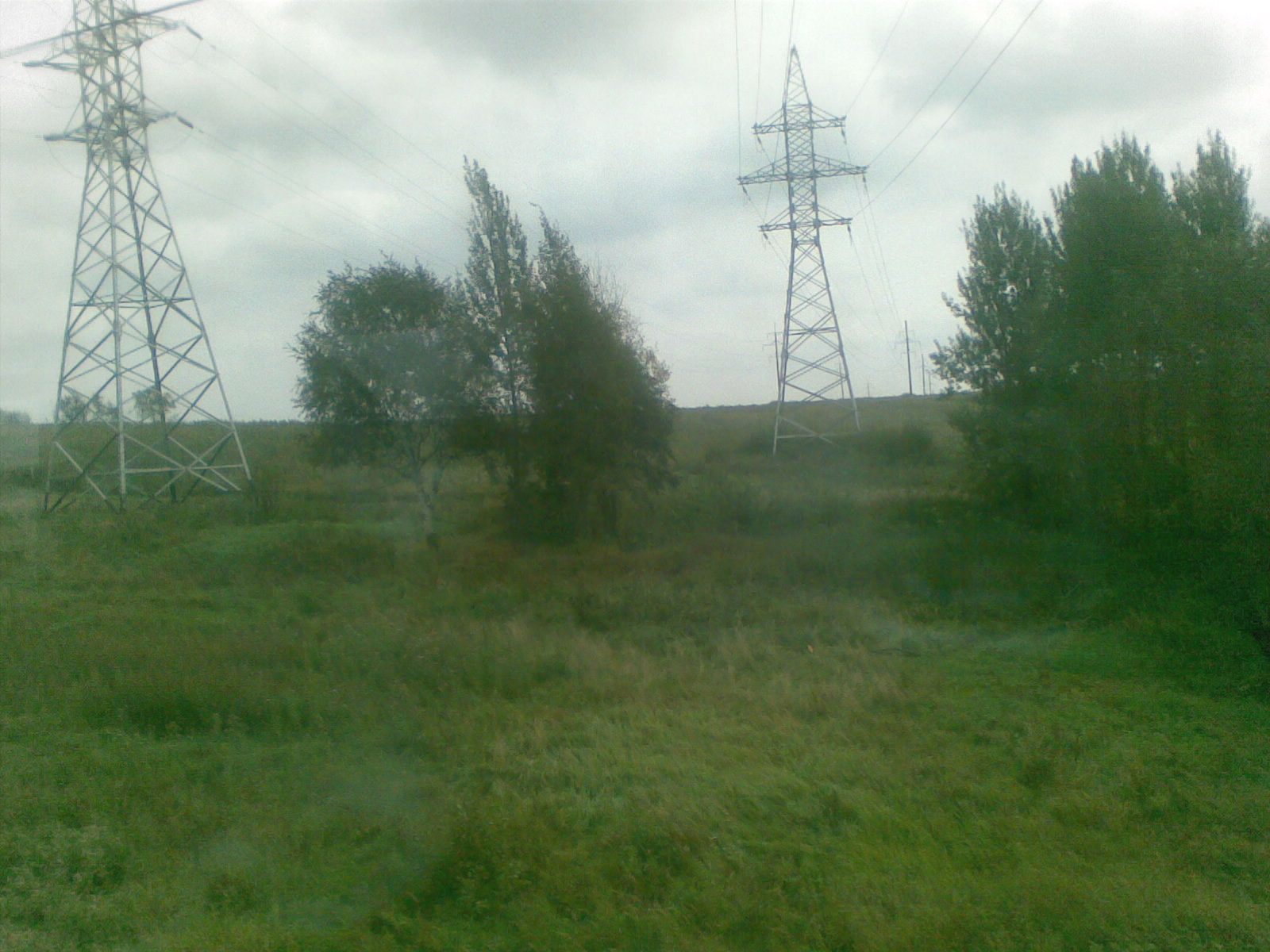
Smolensk-Moscow Upland (2006)

The Smolensk–Moscow Upland is located in the Yaroslavl, Vladimir, Moscow and Smolensk regions of Russia, as well as the Vitebsk region of Belarus.

== Geography ==
It stretches from southwest to northeast from the Belarusian city of Orsha to Yuriev-Polsky. It consists of the Smolensk Upland (western part) and the Moscow Uplands (eastern part).

It extends 500 km. Its highest point is 320 m (northeastern part of Smolensk). The terrain is hilly, erosion-moraine. In the west the moraine chain goes to the Belarusian ridge .

The Dnieper (west) and the Volga (east) rivers drain its hill. The watersheds feed three seas: the Baltic (Kasplya → Western Dvina), Black (Dnieper) and the Caspian (the Volga, the Oka River and their tributaries).

== Ecology ==
It is covered with mixed forests, dominated by spruce and birch. Peat bogs are also present.

Its soils are mainly sod-podzolic, loamy, except for the eastern part of the hill, where more fertile gray forest soil is found. The area is called the Vladimir ( St. George's) Opole.
