= Uplands Academy =

Location
- Lower High Street; Wadhurst, East Sussex, TN5 6AZ; England; 51°03′37″N 0°20′25″E

Information
- Type: Academy
- Local authority: East Sussex
- Trust: Mark Education trust
- Department for Education URN: 148945 Tables
- Ofsted: Reports
- Gender: Coeducational
- Age: 11 to 18
- Website: https://www.uplands-academy.org/

Uplands Academy (formerly Uplands Community College) is a coeducational secondary school and sixth form located in Wadhurst, East Sussex, England.

== History ==
It is rumoured that the school was built on the grounds of a large family house called Uplands. Uplands was purchased by Taverner Barrington Miller for about £5000 in about 1918. The house was requisitioned by the army during World War II and was demolished shortly afterwards.

The school originally was built during the mid 20th century and has been developed greatly over the years. The college has a block-based architecture and layout. The oldest of these blocks (which was replaced in 2021) houses the: main hall, staff room, school offices and classrooms. Other buildings in the school include the 'Creative Arts Building'; the Science Building, named after an Uplands science teacher, Mr Goodwin; The James building, (originally called the IL Block but was renamed in 2021); and the newest building, built to replace the oldest “main building" (named after a staff member who helped get the financing for the building “the Hanson building”); there is also a sports centre building providing public facilities as well as the school's P.E. dept.

In 1999, maths teacher Romilda Scannelli won the secondary teacher of the year award at the 1999 National Teaching Awards ceremony.

Jayne Edmonds retired at the end of the 2011–2012 academic year from being Head after 8 years. In September 2012, Liam Collins took over from Jayne Edmonds as Headteacher. After Liam Collins departure from the school Mrs. Justine Mountford was appointed Head from January 2019.

After Mountford's appointment, the college began pushing for a new block for the school. In 2019, Uplands secured the grant to build a new building. On 23 September 2019, ground was broken and construction began on the building. After a year of construction, the new building was opened to students. The block is now named the Hanson building after Mrs S. Hanson, the Director of Finance, who was instrumental in securing the grant for the new building.

In July 2020, head of English Susie Wolfe was recognized as "secondary school teacher of the year" and Ms Julie Nicholls was awarded for her excellent leadership in the SEN department.

Previously a community school administered by East Sussex County Council, In September 2022 Uplands Community College converted to academy status and was renamed Uplands Academy. With this shift, the academy experienced a change of leadership: Ms Anna Robinson took over as principal. The school is now sponsored by the Mark Education Trust.

== Sports Centre ==
Uplands Sports Centre is attached to Uplands Community College. This is a "not-for-profit" centre with a gym and treatment room; the centre runs fitness classes. During the school day, the facilities are used by the PE department and the UCC students.
