= Moscow Uplands =

Coordinates: 57.5000°N 37.2000°E

Moscow Upland is the eastern part of the Smolensk-Moscow Upland, located inside the Moscow (Klin-Dmitrov Ridge) and Vladimir (Yuryevo Opole) regions of Russia.

Extends from the headwaters of Moscow and to the headwaters of the river Vorya Koloksha.

The greatest height - 310 meters Relief - erosion and moraine. The hill is covered with mixed forests (major tree species - pine, birch and aspen).
