= Burtsevo =

Burtsevo may refer to the following rural localities in Russia:

- Burtsevo, Ufimsky District, Republic of Bashkortostan
- Burtsevo, Vladimir Oblast
- Burtsevo, Cherepovetsky District, Vologda Oblast
- Burtsevo, Gryazovetsky District, Vologda Oblast
- Burtsevo, Sokolsky District, Vologda Oblast
- Burtsevo, Vologodsky District, Vologda Oblast
