= Administrative divisions of Vologda Oblast =

Vologda Oblast Russia
- Administrative center: Vologda

Administrative structure (as of 2013)
- Districts: 26
- Cities/towns: 15
- Urban-type settlements: 9
- Selsovets and rural settlement councils: 368

Municipal structure (as of 2002)
- Rural settlements: 8,041 (inhabited); 1,625 (uninhabited)

Administratively, Vologda Oblast is divided into four cities and towns of oblast significance and twenty-six districts.

In terms of the area, the biggest administrative district is Vytegorsky District (13,100 square kilometers (5,100 sq mi)), the smallest ones are Chagodoshchensky and Ust-Kubinsky Districts (2,400 square kilometers (930 sq mi)).

In terms of the population, the biggest administrative district is Vologodsky District (50,956 in 2002), the smallest one is Mezhdurechensky District (7,641).

== Administrative and municipal divisions ==
Map

| Division | Structure | | OKATO | OKTMO | Urban-type settlement/ district-level town* | Rural |
| Division | Administrative | Municipal | OKATO | OKTMO | Urban-type settlement/ district-level town* | Rural |
|---|---|---|---|---|---|---|
| Vologda (Вологда) | city | urban okrug | 19 401 | 19 701 | | |
| Veliky Ustyug (Великий Устюг) | city | (under Velikoustyugsky) | 19 410 | 19 614 | Krasavino (Красавино) town*; Kuzino (Кузино) | |
| Sokol (Сокол) | city | (under Sokolsky) | 19 420 | 19 638 | | |
| Cherepovets (Череповец) | city | urban okrug | 19 430 | 19 730 | | |
| Babayevsky (Бабаевский) | district | | 19 205 | 19 605 | Babayevo (Бабаево) town* | 18 selsovets |
| Babushkinsky (Бабушкинский) | district | | 19 208 | 19 608 | | 15 selsovets |
| Belozersky (Белозерский) | district | | 19 210 | 19 610 | Belozersk (Белозерск) town* | 13 selsovets |
| Vashkinsky (Вашкинский) | district | | 19 212 | 19 612 | | 12 selsovets |
| Velikoustyugsky (Великоустюгский) | district | | 19 214 | 19 614 | | 20 selsovets |
| Verkhovazhsky (Верховажский) | district | | 19 216 | 19 616 | | 14 selsovets |
| Vologodsky (Вологодский) | district | | 19 218 | 19 618 | | 23 selsovets |
| Vozhegodsky (Вожегодский) | district | | 19 220 | 19 620 | Vozhega (Вожега) | 15 selsovets |
| Vytegorsky (Вытегорский) | district | | 19 222 | 19 622 | Vytegra (Вытегра) town* | 15 selsovets |
| Gryazovetsky (Грязовецкий) | district | | 19 224 | 19 624 | Gryazovets (Грязовец) town*; Vokhtoga (Вохтога) | 16 selsovets |
| Kaduysky (Кадуйский) | district | | 19 226 | 19 626 | Kaduy (Кадуй); Khokhlovo (Хохлово) | 7 selsovets |
| Kirillovsky (Кирилловский) | district | | 19 228 | 19 628 | Kirillov (Кириллов) town* | 15 selsovets |
| Kichmengsko-Gorodetsky (Кичменгско-Городецкий) | district | | 19 230 | 19 630 | | 17 selsovets |
| Mezhdurechensky (Междуреченский) | district | | 19 232 | 19 632 | | 8 selsovets |
| Nikolsky (Никольский) | district | | 19 234 | 19 634 | Nikolsk (Никольск) town* | 17 selsovets |
| Nyuksensky (Нюксенский) | district | | 19 236 | 19 636 | | 11 selsovets |
| Sokolsky (Сокольский) | district | | 19 238 | 19 638 | Kadnikov (Кадников) town* | 12 selsovets |
| Syamzhensky (Сямженский) | district | | 19 240 | 19 640 | | 10 selsovets |
| Tarnogsky (Тарногский) | district | | 19 242 | 19 642 | | 13 selsovets |
| Totemsky (Тотемский) | district | | 19 246 | 19 646 | Totma (Тотьма) town* | 15 selsovets |
| Ust-Kubinsky (Усть-Кубинский) | district | | 19 248 | 19 648 | | 10 selsovets |
| Ustyuzhensky (Устюженский) | district | | 19 250 | 19 650 | Ustyuzhna (Устюжна) town* | 13 selsovets |
| Kharovsky (Харовский) | district | | 19 252 | 19 652 | Kharovsk (Харовск) town* | 11 selsovets |
| Chagodoshchensky (Чагодощенский) | district | | 19 254 | 19 654 | Chagoda (Чагода); Sazonovo | 7 selsovets |
| Cherepovetsky (Череповецкий) | district | | 19 256 | 19 656 | | 25 selsovets; 1 rural settlement council |
| Sheksninsky (Шекснинский) | district | | 19 258 | 19 658 | Chyobsara (Чёбсара); Sheksna (Шексна) | 15 selsovets |

== Differences with municipal divisions ==
Most of the administrative districts of Vologda Oblast are municipally incorporated as municipal districts, and two of the cities and towns of oblast significance are municipally incorporated as urban okrugs. There are, however, several exceptions,

- The towns of Veliky Ustyug and Krasavino and the urban-type settlement of Kuzino are municipally incorporated as separate urban settlements of Velikoustyugsky Municipal District;
- The town of Sokol is municipally incorporated as Sokolskoye Urban Settlement of Sokolsky Municipal District.

== History ==
December 29 [O.S. December 18], 1708 Tsar Peter the Great issued an edict which established seven governorates. The description of the borders of the governorates was not given; instead, their area was defined as a set of towns and the lands adjacent to those towns. In the present area of Vologda oblast, two of the governorates — Archangelgorod Governorate (east of the oblast) and Ingermanland Governorate (west of the oblast) — were located. The governorates were subdivided into uyezds, and uyezds into volosts.

The centers of the following uyezds of Archangelgorod Governorate were located in the present-day area of Vologda Oblast,

- Charondsky Uyezd (the administrative center was Charonda);
- Totemsky Uyezd (Totma);
- Velikoustyugsky Uyezd (Ustyug Veliky);
- Vologodsky Uyezd (Vologda).

On June 9 [O.S. May 29], 1719, the governorate was divided into four provinces: Archangelgorod, Vologda, Galich, and Ustyug. The uyezds were transformed into districts, however, in 1727 the districts were transformed back into uyezds. February 5 [O.S. January 25] 1780 the Archangelgorod Governorate was transformed into Vologda Viceroyalty. In 1796, the viceroyalty was split into Arkhangelsk and Vologda Governorates. In 1918, the areas which are currently in the east of Vologda Oblast were split off from the Vologda Governorate and moved to the newly established Northern Dvina Governorate. The administrative center of the governorate was Veliky Ustyug.

In 1924, the uyezds of Northern Dvina Governorate were abolished in favor of the new divisions, the districts (raions). Vologda Governorate retained the uyezd division till 1929. On July 15, 1929 the uyezds in Vologda governorate were abolished, and the areas which previously belonged to Vologda and Northern Dvina governorates were merged into Northern Krai. The krai consisted of the Komi-Zyryan Autonomous Oblast, a number of islands in the Arctic Ocean, as well as five administrative districts (okrugs),

- Arkhangelsk Okrug (with the seat located in Arkhangelsk);
- Nenets Okrug (with the borders and the seat to be defined);
- Northern Dvina Okrug (Veliky Ustyug);
- Nyandoma Okrug (Nyandoma);
- Vologda Okrug (Vologda).

All these okrugs (except for the Nenets Okrug) were divided into districts. In 1930, the okrugs were abolished, and the districts became directly subordinate to Northern Krai. In 1936, according to the new Soviet Constitution, the Northern Krai was transformed into Northern Oblast. In 1937, Northern Oblast was split into Arkhangelsk Oblast and Vologda Oblast.

West of Arkhangelsk Governorate, two of the centers of uyezds of Ingermanland Governorate were located in the present-day area of Vologda Oblast,

- Beloozersky Uyezd (the administrative center was Beloozero);
- Ustyuzhensky Uyezd (Ustyuzhna Zheleznopolskaya).

After a series of administrative reforms, by the beginning of the 19th century the west of the oblast belonged to Novgorod Governorate, with the exception of Vytegorsky Uyezd which belonged to Olonets Governorate. In 1922, Olonets Governorate was abolished, and Vytegorsky Uyezd was transferred to Petrograd Governorate (later Leningrad Oblast), with the exception of three volosts, which were moved to Kargopolsky Uyezd and later ended up in Arkhangelsk Oblast.

In June 1918, five uyezds of the Novgorod Governorate, including those located on the area of the present-day Vologda Oblast, were split off to form Cherepovets Governorate, with the administrative center in Cherepovets. On August 1, 1927 Cherepovets Governorate was abolished, and its area became Cherepovets Okrug of Leningrad Oblast. Simultaneously, uyezds were abolished in favor of districts. On September 23, 1937, all these districts (with the towns of Cherepovets, Babayevo, Vytegra, Ustyuzhna, Belozersk, and Kirillov) were transferred to newly established Vologda Oblast.

In total, the following districts formed Vologda Oblast in 1937:

- Transferred from Northern Oblast: Biryakovsky, Chyobsarsky, Gryazovetsky, Kharovsky, Kichmengsko-Gorodetsky, Kubeno-Ozersky, Ledengsky, Lezhsky, Mezhdurechensky, Nikolsky, Nyuksensky, Pavinsky, Sokolsky, Syamzhensky, Tarnogsky, Totemsky, Ust-Alekseevsky, Ust-Kubinsky, Velikoustyugsky, Verkhovazhsky, Vokhomsky, Vozhegodsky Districts, as well as the city of Vologda.
- Transferred from Leningrad Oblast: Andomsky, Babayevsky, Belozersky, Borisovo-Sudsky, Chagodoshchensky, Charozersky, Cherepovetsky, Kaduysky, Kirillovsky, Kovzhinsky, Myaksinsky, Oshtinsky, Petrinevsky, Prisheksninsky, Sholsky, Ustyuzhensky, Vashikinsky, Vytegorsky Districts, as well as the city of Cherepovets.

On August 13, 1944 Pavinsky and Vokhomsky Districts were transferred to Kostroma Oblast.

During the attempted administrative reform in 1963, districts were subdivided into urban and rural districts. The reform was abandoned in 1965, and the division into districts was restored.

=== Abolished districts ===
After 1924 (with the exception of the aborted reform of 1963-1965) borders between the districts sometimes were modified, and as a result some of the districts were abolished. This list includes the districts which existed in the current area of Vologda Oblast.

- Abakanovsky District (the administrative center in the selo of Abakanovo), Leningrad Oblast, established in 1927, abolished in 1931, split between Cherepovetsky and Kaduysky Districts;
- Andomsky District (the selo of Andomsky Pogost), Leningrad Oblast, then Vologda Oblast, established in 1927, abolished in 1955, merged into Vytegorsky District;
- Biryakovsky District (the selo of Biryakovo), Northern Krai, then Vologda Oblast, established in 1935, abolished in 1959, split between Sokolsky and Mezhdurechensky Districts;
- Borisovo-Sudsky District (the selo of Borisovo-Sudskoye), Leningrad Oblast, then Vologda Oblast, established in 1927, abolished in 1959, merged into Babayevsky District;
- Chyobsarsky District (the settlement of Chyobsara), Northern Krai, then Vologda Oblast, established in 1929, abolished in 1962, split between Cherepovetsky and Vologodsky Districts;
- Kokshengsky District (the selo of Tarnogsky Gorodok), Northern Krai, established in 1929, abolished in 1931, merged with Sukhonsky District to form Nyuksensky District;
- Kovzhinsky District (the selo of Annensky Most), Leningrad Oblast, then Vologda Oblast, established in 1927, abolished in 1959, split between Vashkinsky and Vytegorsky Districts;
- Kubeno-Ozersky District (the selo of Kubenskoye), Northern Krai, then Vologda Oblast, established in 1929, abolished in 1962, merged into Vologodsky District;
- Lezhsky District (the selo of Sidorovo, later in the settlement of Lezha), Northern Krai, then Vologda Oblast, established in 1924, abolished in 1959, merged into Gryazovetsky District;
- Myaksinsky District (the selo of Spas-Myaksa), Leningrad Oblast, then Vologda Oblast, established in 1927, abolished in 1960, merged into Cherepovetsky District;
- Nikolsko-Torzhsky District (the selo of Nikolsky Torzhok), Leningrad Oblast, established in 1927, abolished in 1931, merged into Kirillovsky District;
- Oshtinsky District (the selo of Oshta), Leningrad Oblast, then Vologda Oblast, established in 1927, abolished in 1955, split between Vytegorsky and Borisovo-Sudsky Districts;
- Petrinyovsky District (the selo of Voskresenskoye), Leningrad Oblast, then Vologda Oblast, established in 1927, abolished in 1955, merged into Cherepovetsky District;
- Petropavlovsky District, later renamed into Charozersky District (the selo of Petropavlovskoye, later renamed into Charozero), Leningrad Oblast, then Vologda Oblast, established in 1927, abolished in 1955, merged into Kirillovsky District;
- Prisheksninsky District (the selo of Nikolskoye), Leningrad Oblast, then Vologda Oblast, established in 1927, abolished in 1959, merged into Chyobsarsky District;
- Roslyatinsky District (the selo of Roslyatino), Northern Dvina Governorate, then Northern Krai, then Vologda Oblast, established in 1924, abolished in 1931; re-established in 1935, abolished in 1960, split between Babushkinsky and Nikolsky Districts;
- Sholsky District (the selo of Zubovo), Leningrad Oblast, then Vologda Oblast, established in 1927, abolished in 1959, split between Vashkinsky and Belozersky Districts;
- Tolshmensky District (the selo of Krasnoye), Northern Krai, established in 1929, abolished in 1931, split between Shuysky and Totemsky Districts;
- Ulomsky District (the selo of Korotovo), Leningrad Oblast, then Vologda Oblast, established in 1927, abolished in 1931, split between Cherepovetsky District and Vesyegonsky District of Kalinin Oblast; reestablished in 1940, abolished in 1959, merged into Cherepovetsky District.
- Ust-Alexeyevsky District (the selo of Ust-Alexeyevo), Northern Dvina Governorate, then Northern Krai, then Vologda Oblast, established in 1924, abolished in 1928; re-established in 1935, abolished in 1959, merged into Velikoustyugsky District.
- Yenangsky District (the selo of Nizhny Yenangsk), Northern Dvina Governorate, established in 1924, abolished in 1928, merged into Kichmengsko-Gorodetsky District.

=== Renamed districts ===
Four of the districts were renamed: Ledengsky into Babushkinsky, Shuysky into Mezhdurechensky, Sverdlovsky into Sokolsky, and Verkhne-Chagodoshchensky into Chagodoshchensky. Sukhonsky District was renamed into Nyuksensky District after it was merged with Kokshengsky District.
