= Vytegra (disambiguation) =

Vytegra is a town in Vytegorsky District of Vologda Oblast, Russia.

Vytegra may also refer to:

- Vytegra Urban Settlement, Vologda Oblast, Russia, a municipal formation into which the town of district significance of Vytegra is incorporated
- Vytegra (river), a river in Vologda Oblast, Russia

== See also ==
- Vytegorsky District
