= Oshta (river) =

Location
- Country: Russia
- Region: Vologda Oblast
- District: Vytegorsky District

Physical characteristics
- Source: Lake Oshtozero
  - coordinates: 60.7645°N 35.1844°E
- Mouth: Onega Canal
  - coordinates: 60.9051°N 35.5539°E
- Length: 39 km (24 mi)
- Basin size: 374 km^{2} (144 sq mi)

Basin features
- River system: Svir

The Oshta (Russian: Ошта, Veps: Šušt) is a river in Vytegorsky District, Vologda Oblast, Russia. It flows from Lake Oshtozero into the Onega Canal and has a length of 39 kilometers (24 mi).

== Geography ==
The Oshta is 39 kilometers (24 mi) long and its basin covers an area of 374 square kilometers (144 sq mi). The source of the river is Lake Oshtozero, located in the Vepsian Upland (Megra Ridge), from where it flows into Lake Onega via the Onega Canal. The river drops a total of 108 meters (354 ft) and has a stream gradient of 2.77 meters per kilometer (14.6 ft/mi). Much of this is in the upper and middle course of the river, where multiple rapids are located. Around the mouth, a sedge-dominated wetland stretches for some two kilometers (1.2 mi).

Tributaries of the river include the Keskas-ruchey (19 km (12 mi) from mouth), Verkhnyaya Orovashka (9.9 km (6.2 mi) from mouth) and Cheleksa rivers (6.9 km (4.3 mi) from mouth), as well as Lake Urozero.

The biggest settlement along the river is also named Oshta. Other settlements include Simanovo and Kurvoshsky Pogost.

== Environmental values ==
Based on measurements taken between 30 July and 2 August 2024, the water of the Oshta had a pH of 7.9, while the level of total dissolved solids was 207 milligrams per liter (0.000120 oz/cu in).

Before the direct connection with Lake Onega was cut off by the Onega Canal, salmon entered the river to spawn.
