= Koybino =

Koybino Койбино
- Village
- Location within Vologda Oblast Location within Russia
- Coordinates: 60°35′N 36°49′E
- Country: Russia
- Region: Vologda Oblast
- District: Vytegorsky District
- Time zone: UTC+3:00

Koybino (Russian: Койбино) is a rural locality (a village) in Almozerskoye Rural Settlement, Vytegorsky District, Vologda Oblast, Russia. The population was 10 as of 2002.

== Geography ==
Koybino is located 67 km southeast of Vytegra (the district's administrative centre) by road. Mitino is the nearest rural locality.
