= Nizhneye Ponizovye =

Nizhneye Ponizovye Нижнее Понизовье
- Village
- Location within Vologda Oblast Location within Russia
- Coordinates: 60°53′N 36°01′E
- Country: Russia
- Region: Vologda Oblast
- District: Vytegorsky District
- Time zone: UTC+3:00

Nizhneye Ponizovye (Russian: Нижнее Понизовье) is a rural locality (a village) in Megorskoye Rural Settlement, Vytegorsky District, Vologda Oblast, Russia. The population was 163 as of 2002. There are 4 streets.

== Geography ==
Nizhneye Ponizovye is located 35 km southwest of Vytegra (the district's administrative centre) by road. Verkhneye Ponizovye is the nearest rural locality.
