= Bely Ruchey, Vytegorsky District, Vologda Oblast =

Bely Ruchey Белый Ручей
- Village
- Location within Vologda Oblast Location within Russia
- Coordinates: 60°55′N 36°49′E
- Country: Russia
- Region: Vologda Oblast
- District: Vytegorsky District
- Time zone: UTC+3:00

Bely Ruchey (Russian: Белый Ручей) is a rural locality (a village) in Devyatinskoye Rural Settlement, Vytegorsky District, Vologda Oblast, Russia. The population was 22 as of 2002.

== Geography ==
Bely Ruchey is located 26 km southeast of Vytegra (the district's administrative centre) by road. Depo is the nearest rural locality.
