= Tudozersky Pogost =

Tudozersky Pogost Тудозерский Погост
- Village
- Location within Vologda Oblast Location within Russia
- Coordinates: 61°06′N 36°32′E
- Country: Russia
- Region: Vologda Oblast
- District: Vytegorsky District
- Time zone: UTC+3:00

Tudozersky Pogost (Russian: Тудозерский Погост) is a rural locality (a village) in Andomskoye Rural Settlement, Vytegorsky District, Vologda Oblast, Russia. The population was 171 as of 2002. There are 4 streets.

== Geography ==
Tudozersky Pogost is located 15 km northeast of Vytegra (the district's administrative centre) by road. Kalinovskaya is the nearest rural locality.
