= Verkhnyaya Vodlitsa =

Verkhnyaya Vodlitsa Верхняя Водлица
- Village
- Location within Vologda Oblast Location within Russia
- Coordinates: 60°45′N 35°43′E
- Country: Russia
- Region: Vologda Oblast
- District: Vytegorsky District
- Time zone: UTC+3:00

Verkhnyaya Vodlitsa (Russian: Верхняя Водлица) is a rural locality (a village) in Oshtinskoye Rural Settlement, Vytegorsky District, Vologda Oblast, Russia. The population was 17 as of 2002. There are 2 streets.

== Geography ==
Verkhnyaya Vodlitsa is located 73 km southwest of Vytegra (the district's administrative centre) by road. Gorny Ruchey is the nearest rural locality.
