= Spitsyno =

Spitsyno Спицыно
- Village
- Location within Vologda Oblast Location within Russia
- Coordinates: 61°15′N 36°38′E
- Country: Russia
- Region: Vologda Oblast
- District: Vytegorsky District
- Time zone: UTC+3:00

Spitsyno (Russian: Спицыно) is a rural locality (a village) in Andomskoye Rural Settlement, Vytegorsky District, Vologda Oblast, Russia. The population was 5 as of 2002.

== Geography ==
Spitsyno is located 35 km north of Vytegra (the district's administrative centre) by road. Pirogovo is the nearest rural locality.
