= Mironovo, Vytegorsky District, Vologda Oblast =

Mironovo Мироново
- Village
- Location within Vologda Oblast Location within Russia
- Coordinates: 60°46′N 37°47′E
- Country: Russia
- Region: Vologda Oblast
- District: Vytegorsky District
- Time zone: UTC+3:00

Mironovo (Russian: Мироново) is a rural locality (a village) in Kemskoye Rural Settlement, Vytegorsky District, Vologda Oblast, Russia. The population was 22 as of 2002.

== Geography ==
Mironovo is located 89 km southeast of Vytegra (the district's administrative centre) by road. Prokshino is the nearest rural locality.
