= Rubtsovo, Vytegorsky District, Vologda Oblast =

Rubtsovo Рубцово
- Village
- Location within Vologda Oblast Location within Russia
- Coordinates: 61°10′N 36°43′E
- Country: Russia
- Region: Vologda Oblast
- District: Vytegorsky District
- Time zone: UTC+3:00

Rubtsovo (Russian: Рубцово) is a rural locality (a village) in Andomskoye Rural Settlement, Vytegorsky District, Vologda Oblast, Russia. The population was 29 as of 2002.

== Geography ==
Rubtsovo is located 35 km northeast of Vytegra (the district's administrative centre) by road. Perevoz is the nearest rural locality.
