= Kovzha =

Coordinates: 60°20′20″N 37°09′06″E

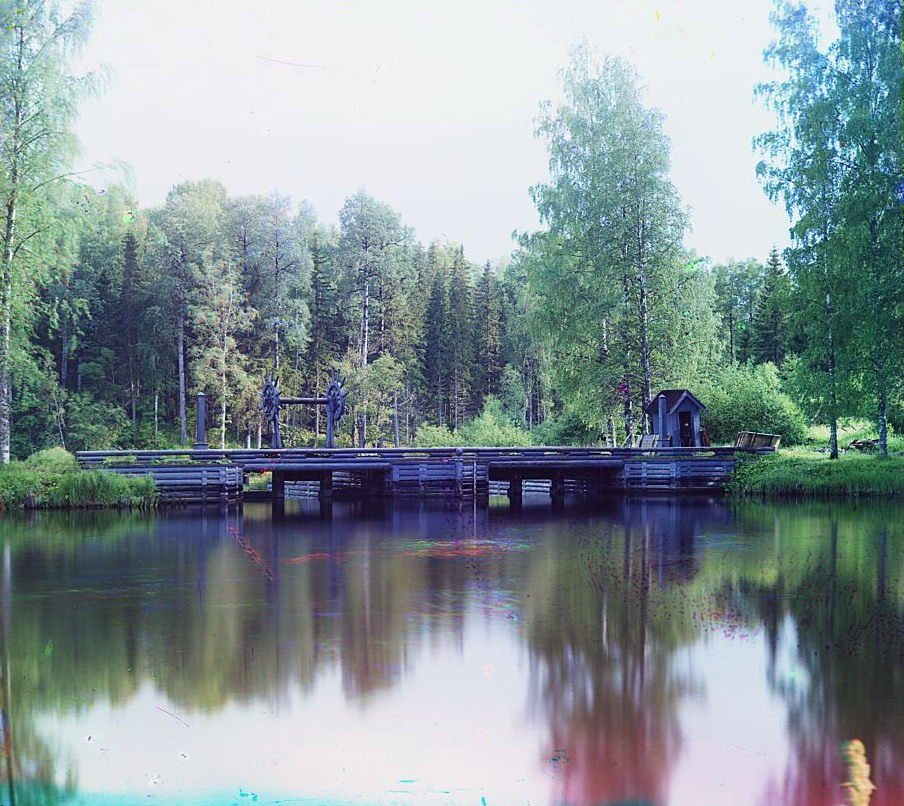
- Native name: Ковжа (Russian)

Location
- Country: Russia

Physical characteristics
- Source
  - location: Lake Kovzhskoye
  - elevation: 162 metres (531 ft)
- Mouth
  - location: Lake Beloye
  - elevation: 113 metres (371 ft)
- Length: 86 km (53 mi)
- Basin size: 5,000 km^{2} (1,900 sq mi)
- Discharge
  - average: 44.8 cubic metres per second (1,580 cu ft/s)

Basin features
- Progression: Lake Beloye→ Sheksna→ Volga→ Caspian Sea

Map of the Rybinsk Reservoir basin. The Kovzha is shown on the map.

The Kovzha (Ковжа) is a river in the Vytegorsky, Belozersky, and Vashkinsky districts of Vologda Oblast in Russia. It originates from Lake Kovzhskoye and is a tributary of Lake Beloye. It is 86 kilometres (53 mi) long, and the area of its basin is 5,000 square kilometres (1,900 sq mi). The Kovzha River is a part of the Volga–Baltic Waterway. The main tributaries are the Tumba and the Shola (both right).

The source of the Kovzha is in the western bay of Lake Kovzhskoye. The river follows about 10 kilometres (6.2 mi) its natural course and then joins the Volga–Baltic Waterway and turns south. In the lower course, the Kovzha forms the border between Belozersky and Vashkinsky Districts. The lowest course of the river is a water reservoir. Here the Kovzha accepts the Shola, its main tributary, from the right.

The river basin of the Kovzha comprises the central part of Vytegorsky District, the western part of Vashkinsky District, and the northern part of Belozersky District. It is limited in the east by the river basin of the Kema, in the north and the west by the river basins of tributaries of Lake Onega, most notably the Vytegra, and in the south by the basin of the Megra, another tributary of lake Beloye.

Between 1927 and 1959 the selo of Annensky Most, in the middle stream of the Kovzha, was the administrative center of Kovzhinsky District. The name of the district originated from the name of the river. In 1959, the district was abolished, and its area was split between Vashkinsky and Vytegorsky Districts.
