= Prokshino, Vytegorsky District, Vologda Oblast =

Prokshino Прокшино
- Village
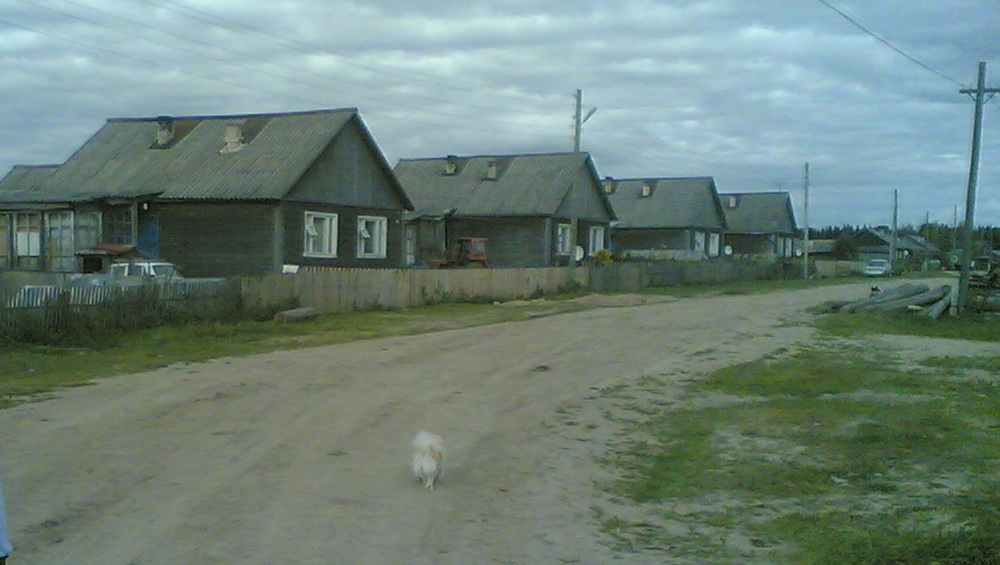
- Prokshino in 2009

- Location within Vologda Oblast Location within Russia
- Coordinates: 60°46′N 37°47′E
- Country: Russia
- Region: Vologda Oblast
- District: Vytegorsky District
- Time zone: UTC+3:00

Prokshino (Russian: Прокшино) is a rural locality (a village) in Kemskoye Settlement, Vytegorsky District, Vologda Oblast, Russia. The population was 147 as of 2002. There are 3 streets.

== Geography ==
Prokshino is located 90 km (56 mi) southeast of Vytegra (the district's administrative centre) by road. Pryachevo(priatat` in russian hide) is the nearest locality. Prokshino famous for a huge stone, Urvanov from Mirny in the Guinness Book of Records for digging under it the treasures were hidden under large stones. Urvanov Vladimir wrote on the Internet in 10 sites that he saw the device burst over the Lop(bang in russian) Lake, drops of gold fell
