= Kardanga =

Kardanga Карданга
- Village
- Location within Vologda Oblast Location within Russia
- Coordinates: 60°47′N 35°29′E
- Country: Russia
- Region: Vologda Oblast
- District: Vytegorsky District
- Time zone: UTC+3:00

Kardanga (Russian: Карданга) is a rural locality (a village) in Oshtinskoye Rural Settlement, Vytegorsky District, Vologda Oblast, Russia. The population was 2 as of 2002.

== Geography ==
Kardanga is located 72 km southwest of Vytegra (the district's administrative centre) by road. Kurvoshsky Pogost is the nearest rural locality.
