= Bessonovo =

Bessonovo Бессоново
- Village
- Location within Vologda Oblast Location within Russia
- Coordinates: 60°43′N 37°06′E
- Country: Russia
- Region: Vologda Oblast
- District: Vytegorsky District
- Time zone: UTC+3:00

Bessonovo (Russian: Бессоново) is a rural locality (a village) in Annenskoye Rural Settlement, Vytegorsky District, Vologda Oblast, Russia. The population was 74 as of 2002. There are 2 streets.

== Geography ==
Bessonovo is located 65 km southeast of Vytegra (the district's administrative centre) by road. Veliky Dvor is the nearest rural locality.
