= Agafonovskaya, Vytegorsky District, Vologda Oblast =

Agafonovskaya Агафоновская
- Village
- Location within Vologda Oblast Location within Russia
- Coordinates: 60°47′N 37°57′E
- Country: Russia
- Region: Vologda Oblast
- District: Vytegorsky District
- Time zone: UTC+3:00

Agafonovskaya (Russian: Агафоновская) is a rural locality (a village) in Kemskoye Rural Settlement, Vytegorsky District, Vologda Oblast, Russia. The population was 22 as of 2002.

== Geography ==
Agafonovskaya is located 100 km southeast of Vytegra (the district's administrative centre) by road. Pankratovo is the nearest rural locality.
