= Volokov Most =

Volokov Most Волоков Мост
- Settlement
- Location within Vologda Oblast Location within Russia
- Coordinates: 60°51′N 36°53′E
- Country: Russia
- Region: Vologda Oblast
- District: Vytegorsky District
- Time zone: UTC+3:00

Volokov Most (Russian: Волоков Мост) is a rural locality (a settlement) and the administrative center of Almozerskoye Rural Settlement, Vytegorsky District, Vologda Oblast, Russia. The population was 725 as of 2002. There are 13 streets.

== Geography ==
Volokov Most is located 38 km southeast of Vytegra (the district's administrative centre) by road. Sredny Rubezh is the nearest rural locality.
