= Pavshozero =

Pavshozero Павшозеро
- Settlement
- Location within Vologda Oblast Location within Russia
- Coordinates: 60°50′N 37°04′E
- Country: Russia
- Region: Vologda Oblast
- District: Vytegorsky District
- Time zone: UTC+3:00

Pavshozero (Russian: Павшозеро) is a rural locality (a settlement) in Annenskoye Rural Settlement, Vytegorsky District, Vologda Oblast, Russia. The population was 466 as of 2002. There are 7 streets.

== Geography ==
Pavshozero is located 44 km southeast of Vytegra (the district's administrative centre) by road. Staroye Petrovskoye is the nearest rural locality.
