= Kostruchey =

Kostruchey Костручей
- Settlement
- Location within Vologda Oblast Location within Russia
- Coordinates: 60°46′N 37°12′E
- Country: Russia
- Region: Vologda Oblast
- District: Vytegorsky District
- Time zone: UTC+3:00

Kostruchey (Russian: Костручей) is a rural locality (a settlement) in Annenskoye Rural Settlement, Vytegorsky District, Vologda Oblast, Russia. The population was 50 as of 2002.

== Geography ==
Kostruchey is located 55 km southeast of Vytegra (the district's administrative centre) by road. Annensky Most is the nearest rural locality.
