= Uzhla =

Uzhla Ужла
- Village
- Location within Vologda Oblast Location within Russia
- Coordinates: 60°39′N 37°09′E
- Country: Russia
- Region: Vologda Oblast
- District: Vytegorsky District
- Time zone: UTC+3:00

Uzhla (Russian: Ужла) is a rural locality (a village) in Annenskoye Rural Settlement, Vytegorsky District, Vologda Oblast, Russia. The population was 112 as of 2002. There are 4 streets.

== Geography ==
Uzhla is located 70 km southeast of Vytegra (the district's administrative centre) by road. Annensky Most is the nearest rural locality.
