= Nikulino, Vytegorsky District, Vologda Oblast =

Village in Vologda Oblast, Russia

Nikulino Никулино
- Village
- Location within Vologda Oblast Location within Russia
- Coordinates: 61°18′N 36°36′E
- Country: Russia
- Region: Vologda Oblast
- District: Vytegorsky District
- Time zone: UTC+3:00

Nikulino (Russian: Никулино) is a rural locality (a village) in Saminskoye Rural Settlement, Vytegorsky District, Vologda Oblast, Russia. The population was 7 as of 2002.

== Geography ==
Nikulino is located 38 km north of Vytegra (the district's administrative centre) by road. Vashukovo is the nearest rural locality.
