= Verkhny Rubezh =

Verkhny Rubezh Верхний Рубеж
- Selo
- Location within Vologda Oblast Location within Russia
- Coordinates: 60°49′N 37°00′E
- Country: Russia
- Region: Vologda Oblast
- District: Vytegorsky District
- Time zone: UTC+3:00

Verkhny Rubezh (Russian: Верхний Рубеж) is a rural locality (a selo) in Almozerskoye Rural Settlement, Vytegorsky District, Vologda Oblast, Russia. The population was 60 as of 2002.

== Geography ==
Verkhny Rubezh is located 43 km southeast of Vytegra (the district's administrative centre) by road. Sredny Rubezh is the nearest rural locality.
