= Loychino =

Loychino Лойчино
- Village
- Location within Vologda Oblast Location within Russia
- Coordinates: 60°34′N 36°48′E
- Country: Russia
- Region: Vologda Oblast
- District: Vytegorsky District
- Time zone: UTC+3:00

Loychino (Russian: Лойчино) is a rural locality (a village) in Almozerskoye Rural Settlement, Vytegorsky District, Vologda Oblast, Russia. The population was 6 as of 2002.

== Geography ==
Loychino is located 69 km southeast of Vytegra (the district's administrative centre) by road. Rogozino is the nearest rural locality.
