= Kryukovskaya =

Kryukovskaya Крюковская
- Village
- Location within Vologda Oblast Location within Russia
- Coordinates: 61°21′N 36°35′E
- Country: Russia
- Region: Vologda Oblast
- District: Vytegorsky District
- Time zone: UTC+3:00

Kryukovskaya (Russian: Крюковская) is a rural locality (a village) in Saminskoye Rural Settlement, Vytegorsky District, Vologda Oblast, Russia. The population was 14 as of 2002.

== Geography ==
Kryukovskaya is located 43 km north of Vytegra (the district's administrative centre) by road. Titovo is the nearest rural locality.
