= Lake Kovzhskoye =

Lake in Vologda, Russia

- Ковжское озеро (Russian)
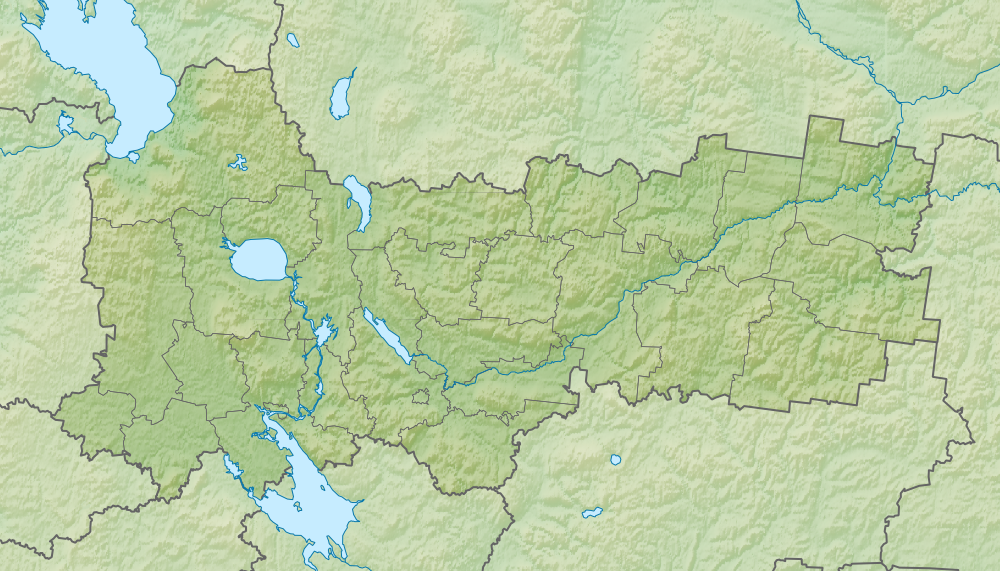
- Location within Vologda Oblast
- Location: Vologda Oblast
- Coordinates: 60°52′35″N 37°22′27″E
- Primary outflows: Kovzha River
- Catchment area: 438 square kilometres (169 mi^{2})
- Basin countries: Russia
- Surface area: 65 square kilometres (25 mi^{2})
- Surface elevation: 162 m (531 ft)

Map of the Rybinsk Reservoir basin. Lake Kovzhskoye is shown on the map.

Lake Kovzhskoye (Russian: Ковжское озеро) is a freshwater lake, located in the center of Vytegorsky District of Vologda Oblast in Russia. It is one of the biggest lakes in Vologda Oblast and the second biggest one in Vytegorsky District behind Lake Onega. The area of the lake is 65 square kilometres (25 mi^{2}), and the area of its basin is 438 square kilometres (169 mi^{2}). The main tributary of the lake is the Iles River. Lake Kovzhskoye is the source of Kovzha River, one of the principal tributaries of Lake Beloye. The lake belongs to the basins of the Volga and the Caspian Sea.

The lake has a complex shape, with one bay in the south and one more bay (Lake Lozskoye, where the source of the Kovzha is located) in the southwest. From the north, Lake Kuzhozero is adjacent to Lake Kovzhskoye.

The catchment area of Lake Kovzhskoye is relatively small, since the lake is located in the Andoma Hills. To the east of the lake, there is river basin of the Kema River, another tributary of Lake Beloye, and the areas to the north and to the west drain into Lake Onega.

Two villages, Loza and Yakshino, are located on the southern shore of the lake. Both are on the highway connecting Vologda with Medvezhyegorsk via Vytegra and Pudozh.
