= Kanshino =

Kanshino Каньшино
- Village
- Location within Vologda Oblast Location within Russia
- Coordinates: 61°22′N 36°39′E
- Country: Russia
- Region: Vologda Oblast
- District: Vytegorsky District
- Time zone: UTC+3:00

Kanshino (Russian: Каньшино) is a rural locality (a village) in Saminskoye Rural Settlement, Vytegorsky District, Vologda Oblast, Russia. The population was 22 as of 2002.

== Geography ==
Kanshino is located 48 km north of Vytegra (the district's administrative centre) by road. Oktyabrsky is the nearest rural locality.
