= Kyabelovo =

Kyabelovo Кябелово
- Village
- Location within Vologda Oblast Location within Russia
- Coordinates: 60°48′N 37°25′E
- Country: Russia
- Region: Vologda Oblast
- District: Vytegorsky District
- Time zone: UTC+3:00

Kyabelovo (Russian: Кябелово) is a rural locality (a village) in Kemskoye Rural Settlement, Vytegorsky District, Vologda Oblast, Russia. The population was 2 as of 2002. There are 4 streets.

== Geography ==
Kyabelovo is located 66 km southeast of Vytegra (the district's administrative centre) by road. Ryumino is the nearest rural locality.
