= Matveyevo, Vytegorsky District, Vologda Oblast =

Matveyevo Матвеево
- Village
- Location within Vologda Oblast Location within Russia
- Coordinates: 60°45′N 37°58′E
- Country: Russia
- Region: Vologda Oblast
- District: Vytegorsky District
- Time zone: UTC+3:00

Matveyevo (Russian: Матвеево) is a rural locality (a village) in Kemskoye Rural Settlement, Vytegorsky District, Vologda Oblast, Russia. The population was 3 as of 2002.

== Geography ==
Matveyevo is located 100 km southeast of Vytegra (the district's administrative centre) by road. Yelinskaya is the nearest rural locality.
