= Petryayevo, Sokolsky District, Vologda Oblast =

Petryayevo Петряево
- Village
- Location within Vologda Oblast Location within Russia
- Coordinates: 59°35′N 40°57′E
- Country: Russia
- Region: Vologda Oblast
- District: Sokolsky District
- Time zone: UTC+3:00

Petryayevo (Russian: Петряево) is a rural locality (a village) in Vorobyovskoye Rural Settlement, Sokolsky District, Vologda Oblast, Russia. The population was 33 as of 2002.

== Geography ==
Petryayevo is located 72 km northeast of Sokol (the district's administrative centre) by road. Bolshiye Ivanovskiye is the nearest rural locality.
