= Zhelvachevo =

Zhelvachevo Желвачево
- Village
- Location within Vologda Oblast Location within Russia
- Coordinates: 61°09′N 36°44′E
- Country: Russia
- Region: Vologda Oblast
- District: Vytegorsky District
- Time zone: UTC+3:00

Zhelvachevo (Russian: Желвачево) is a rural locality (a village) in Andomskoye Rural Settlement, Vytegorsky District, Vologda Oblast, Russia. The population was 5 as of 2002.

== Geography ==
Zhelvachevo is located 37 km northeast of Vytegra (the district's administrative centre) by road. Makachevo is the nearest rural locality.
