= Nizhnyaya Vodlitsa =

Nizhnyaya Vodlitsa Нижняя Водлица
- Village
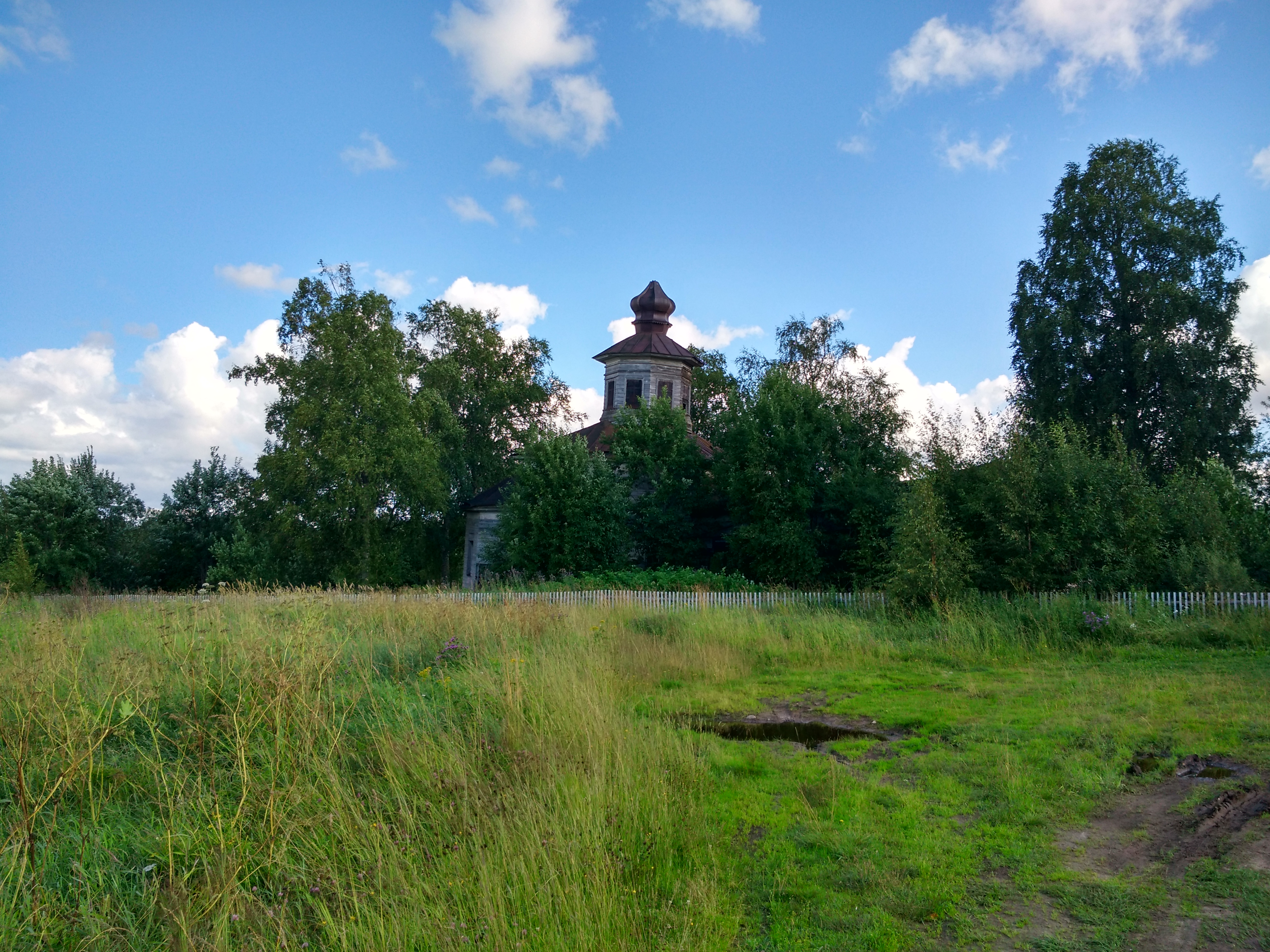
- Church of St. George the Victorious

- Location within Vologda Oblast Location within Russia
- Coordinates: 60°49′N 35°44′E
- Country: Russia
- Region: Vologda Oblast
- District: Vytegorsky District
- Time zone: UTC+3:00

Nizhnyaya Vodlitsa (Russian: Нижняя Водлица) is a rural locality (a village) in Oshtinskoye Rural Settlement, Vytegorsky District, Vologda Oblast, Russia. The population was 44 as of 2002. There are 3 streets.

== Geography ==
Nizhnyaya Vodlitsa is located 53 km southwest of Vytegra (the district's administrative centre) by road. Perkhinskaya is the nearest rural locality.
