= Zagorodskaya =

Zagorodskaya Загородская
- Village
- Location within Vologda Oblast Location within Russia
- Coordinates: 61°21′N 36°37′E
- Country: Russia
- Region: Vologda Oblast
- District: Vytegorsky District
- Time zone: UTC+3:00

Zagorodskaya (Russian: Загородская) is a rural locality (a village) in Saminskoye Rural Settlement, Vytegorsky District, Vologda Oblast, Russia. The population was 2 as of 2002.

== Geography ==
Zagorodskaya is located 44 km north of Vytegra (the district's administrative centre) by road. Pigarevo is the nearest rural locality.
