= Morozovo, Vytegorsky District, Vologda Oblast =

Morozovo Морозово
- Village
- Location within Vologda Oblast Location within Russia
- Coordinates: 60°42′N 37°07′E
- Country: Russia
- Region: Vologda Oblast
- District: Vytegorsky District
- Time zone: UTC+3:00

Morozovo (Russian: Морозово) is a rural locality (a village) in Annenskoye Rural Settlement, Vytegorsky District, Vologda Oblast, Russia. The population was 7 as of 2002.

== Geography ==
Morozovo is located 66 km southeast of Vytegra (the district's administrative centre) by road. Bessonovo is the nearest rural locality.
