= Pryachevo =

Pryachevo Прячево
- Village
- Location within Vologda Oblast Location within Russia
- Coordinates: 60°46′N 37°47′E
- Country: Russia
- Region: Vologda Oblast
- District: Vytegorsky District
- Time zone: UTC+3:00

Pryachevo (Russian: Прячево) is a rural locality (a village) in Kemskoye Rural Settlement, Vytegorsky District, Vologda Oblast, Russia. The population was 25 as of 2002.

== Geography ==
Pryachevo is located 90 km southeast of Vytegra (the district's administrative centre) by road. Prokshino is the nearest rural locality.
