= Vashukovo =

Vashukovo Вашуково
- Village
- Location within Vologda Oblast Location within Russia
- Coordinates: 61°18′N 36°36′E
- Country: Russia
- Region: Vologda Oblast
- District: Vytegorsky District
- Time zone: UTC+3:00

Vashukovo (Russian: Вашуково) is a rural locality (a village) in Saminskoye Rural Settlement, Vytegorsky District, Vologda Oblast, Russia. The population was 12 as of 2002.

== Geography ==
Vashukovo is located 37 km north of Vytegra (the district's administrative centre) by road. Nikulino is the nearest rural locality.
