= Kabetsovo =

Kabetsovo Кабецово
- Village
- Location within Vologda Oblast Location within Russia
- Coordinates: 60°48′N 37°44′E
- Country: Russia
- Region: Vologda Oblast
- District: Vytegorsky District
- Time zone: UTC+3:00

Kabetsovo (Russian: Кабецово) is a rural locality (a village) in Kemskoye Rural Settlement, Vytegorsky District, Vologda Oblast, Russia. As of 2002 its population was 8 people.

== Geography ==
Kabetsovo is located 84 km southeast of Vytegra (the district's administrative centre) by road. Mirny is the nearest locality. Lake Indoman is the nearest lake to Kabetsovo.
