= Bereg, Vytegorsky District, Vologda Oblast =

Bereg Берег
- Village
- Location within Vologda Oblast Location within Russia
- Coordinates: 61°20′N 36°36′E
- Country: Russia
- Region: Vologda Oblast
- District: Vytegorsky District
- Time zone: UTC+3:00

Bereg (Russian: Берег) is a rural locality (a village) in Saminskoye Rural Settlement, Vytegorsky District, Vologda Oblast, Russia. The population was 27 as of 2002.

== Geography ==
Bereg is located 43 km north of Vytegra (the district's administrative centre) by road. Saminsky Pogost is the nearest rural locality.
