= Blizhnyaya Kardanka =

Blizhnyaya Kardanka Ближняя Карданка
- Village
- Location within Vologda Oblast Location within Russia
- Coordinates: 60°55′N 36°34′E
- Country: Russia
- Region: Vologda Oblast
- District: Vytegorsky District
- Time zone: UTC+3:00

Blizhnyaya Kardanka (Russian: Ближняя Карданка) is a rural locality (a village) in Ankhimovskoye Rural Settlement, Vytegorsky District, Vologda Oblast, Russia. The population was 2 as of 2002.

== Geography ==
Blizhnyaya Kardanka is located 13 km southeast of Vytegra (the district's administrative centre) by road. Belousovo is the nearest rural locality.
