= Syargozero =

Syargozero Сяргозеро
- Village
- Location within Vologda Oblast Location within Russia
- Coordinates: 60°30′N 36°00′E
- Country: Russia
- Region: Vologda Oblast
- District: Vytegorsky District
- Time zone: UTC+3:00

Syargozero (Russian: Сяргозеро) is a rural locality (a village) in Megorskoye Rural Settlement, Vytegorsky District, Vologda Oblast, Russia. The population was 17 as of 2002.

== Geography ==
Syargozero is located 83 km south of Vytegra (the district's administrative centre) by road. Mezhozerye is the nearest rural locality.
