= Tatarikha =

Tatarikha Татариха
- Village
- Location within Vologda Oblast Location within Russia
- Coordinates: 60°48′N 37°44′E
- Country: Russia
- Region: Vologda Oblast
- District: Vytegorsky District
- Time zone: UTC+3:00

Tatarikha (Russian: Татариха) is a rural locality (a village) in Kemskoye Rural Settlement, Vytegorsky District, Vologda Oblast, Russia. The population was 11 as of 2002.

== Geography ==
Tatarikha is located 83 km southeast of Vytegra (the district's administrative centre) by road. Prokshino is the nearest rural locality.
