= Troshigino =

Troshigino Трошигино
- Village
- Location within Vologda Oblast Location within Russia
- Coordinates: 61°14′N 36°38′E
- Country: Russia
- Region: Vologda Oblast
- District: Vytegorsky District
- Time zone: UTC+3:00

Troshigino (Russian: Трошигино) is a rural locality (a village) in Andomskoye Rural Settlement, Vytegorsky District, Vologda Oblast, Russia. The population was 61 as of 2002.

== Geography ==
Troshigino is located 32 km north of Vytegra (the district's administrative centre) by road. Terovo is the nearest rural locality.
