= Staroye Petrovskoye =

Staroye Petrovskoye Старое Петровское
- Village
- Location within Vologda Oblast Location within Russia
- Coordinates: 60°49′N 37°01′E
- Country: Russia
- Region: Vologda Oblast
- District: Vytegorsky District
- Time zone: UTC+3:00

Staroye Petrovskoye (Russian: Старое Петровское) is a rural locality (a village) in Almozerskoye Rural Settlement, Vytegorsky District, Vologda Oblast, Russia. The population was 41 as of 2002.

== Geography ==
Staroye Petrovskoye is located 44 km southeast of Vytegra (the district's administrative centre) by road. Verkhny Rubezh is the nearest rural locality.
