= Sorochye Pole =

Sorochye Pole Сорочье Поле
- Village
- Location within Vologda Oblast Location within Russia
- Coordinates: 61°16′N 36°34′E
- Country: Russia
- Region: Vologda Oblast
- District: Vytegorsky District
- Time zone: UTC+3:00

Sorochye Pole (Russian: Сорочье Поле) is a rural locality (a village) in Andomskoye Rural Settlement, Vytegorsky District, Vologda Oblast, Russia. The population was 7 as of 2002.

== Geography ==
Sorochye Pole is located 35 km north of Vytegra (the district's administrative centre) by road. Oparino is the nearest rural locality.
