= Badozhsky Pogost =

Badozhsky Pogost Бадожский Погост
- Village
- Location within Vologda Oblast Location within Russia
- Coordinates: 60°52′N 37°22′E
- Country: Russia
- Region: Vologda Oblast
- District: Vytegorsky District
- Time zone: UTC+3:00

Badozhsky Pogost (Russian: Бадожский Погост) is a rural locality (a village) in Annenskoye Rural Settlement, Vytegorsky District, Vologda Oblast, Russia. The population was 73 as of 2002.

== Geography ==
Badozhsky Pogost is located 68 km southeast of Vytegra (the district's administrative centre) by road. Veliky Dvor is the nearest rural locality.
