= Sredny Rubezh =

Sredny Rubezh Средний Рубеж
- Village
- Location within Vologda Oblast Location within Russia
- Coordinates: 60°50′N 36°59′E
- Country: Russia
- Region: Vologda Oblast
- District: Vytegorsky District
- Time zone: UTC+3:00

Sredny Rubezh (Russian: Средний Рубеж) is a rural locality (a village) in Almozerskoye Rural Settlement, Vytegorsky District, Vologda Oblast, Russia. The population was 2 as of 2002.

== Geography ==
Sredny Rubezh is located 41 km southeast of Vytegra (the district's administrative centre) by road. Verkhny Rubezh is the nearest rural locality.
