= Gorny Ruchey =

Gorny Ruchey Горный Ручей
- Village
- Location within Vologda Oblast Location within Russia
- Coordinates: 60°42′N 35°43′E
- Country: Russia
- Region: Vologda Oblast
- District: Vytegorsky District
- Time zone: UTC+3:00

Gorny Ruchey (Russian: Горный Ручей) is a rural locality (a village) in Oshtinskoye Rural Settlement, Vytegorsky District, Vologda Oblast, Russia. The population was 311 as of 2002. There are 6 streets.

== Geography ==
Gorny Ruchey is located 64 km southwest of Vytegra (the district's administrative centre) by road. Vasyukovskiye Ostrova is the nearest rural locality.
