= Yevsinskaya =

Yevsinskaya Евсинская
- Village
- Location within Vologda Oblast Location within Russia
- Coordinates: 61°03′N 37°35′E
- Country: Russia
- Region: Vologda Oblast
- District: Vytegorsky District
- Time zone: UTC+3:00

Yevsinskaya (Russian: Евсинская) is a rural locality (a village) in Kemskoye Rural Settlement, Vytegorsky District, Vologda Oblast, Russia. The population was 1 as of 2002.

== Geography ==
Yevsinskaya is located 115 km east of Vytegra (the district's administrative centre) by road. Ilyina is the nearest rural locality.
