= Rogozino, Vytegorsky District, Vologda Oblast =

Rogozino Рогозино
- Village
- Location within Vologda Oblast Location within Russia
- Coordinates: 60°35′N 36°48′E
- Country: Russia
- Region: Vologda Oblast
- District: Vytegorsky District
- Time zone: UTC+3:00

Rogozino (Russian: Рогозино) is a rural locality (a village) in Almozerskoye Rural Settlement, Vytegorsky District, Vologda Oblast, Russia. The population was 6 as of 2002.

== Geography ==
Rogozino is located 68 km southeast of Vytegra (the district's administrative centre) by road. Semyonovskaya is the nearest rural locality.
