= Yelinskaya =

Yelinskaya Елинская
- Village
- Location within Vologda Oblast Location within Russia
- Coordinates: 60°46′N 37°58′E
- Country: Russia
- Region: Vologda Oblast
- District: Vytegorsky District
- Time zone: UTC+3:00

Yelinskaya (Russian: Елинская) is a rural locality (a village) in Kemskoye Rural Settlement, Vytegorsky District, Vologda Oblast, Russia. The population was 42 as of 2002.

== Geography ==
Yelinskaya is located 99 km southeast of Vytegra (the district's administrative centre) by road. Deminskaya is the nearest rural locality.
