= Kurvoshsky Pogost =

Kurvoshsky Pogost Курвошский Погост
- Village
- Location within Vologda Oblast Location within Russia
- Coordinates: 60°47′N 35°24′E
- Country: Russia
- Region: Vologda Oblast
- District: Vytegorsky District
- Time zone: UTC+3:00

Kurvoshsky Pogost (Russian: Курвошский Погост) is a rural locality (a village) in Oshtinskoye Rural Settlement, Vytegorsky District, Vologda Oblast, Russia. The population was 177 as of 2002.

== Geography ==
Kurvoshsky Pogost is located 77 km southwest of Vytegra (the district's administrative centre) by road. Ruchey is the nearest rural locality.
