= Simanovo =

Simanovo Симаново
- Village
- Location within Vologda Oblast Location within Russia
- Coordinates: 60°50′N 35°31′E
- Country: Russia
- Region: Vologda Oblast
- District: Vytegorsky District
- Time zone: UTC+3:00

Simanovo (Russian: Симаново) is a rural locality (a village) in Oshtinskoye Rural Settlement, Vytegorsky District, Vologda Oblast, Russia. The population was 31 as of 2002.

== Geography ==
Simanovo is located 67 km southwest of Vytegra (the district's administrative centre) by road. Oshta is the nearest rural locality.
