= Saminsky Pogost =

Saminsky Pogost Саминский Погост
- Village
- Location within Vologda Oblast Location within Russia
- Coordinates: 61°20′N 36°35′E
- Country: Russia
- Region: Vologda Oblast
- District: Vytegorsky District
- Time zone: UTC+3:00

Saminsky Pogost (Russian: Саминский Погост) is a rural locality (a village) in Saminskoye Rural Settlement, Vytegorsky District, Vologda Oblast, Russia. The population was 25 as of 2002.

== Geography ==
Saminsky Pogost is located 42 km (26 mi) north of Vytegra (the district's administrative centre) by road. Kryukovskaya is the nearest rural locality.
