= Lezhë (disambiguation) =

Lezhë or Lezha is a city in central Albania.

Lezhë or Lezha may also refer to:

- Lezhë County, first-level administrative division of Albania
- Lezhë District, second-level administrative division of Albania
- Lezha, a river in Russia
- Lezha, Vologda Oblast, a settlement in Russia
