= Voznesenye =

Voznesenye Вознесенье
- Urban-type settlement
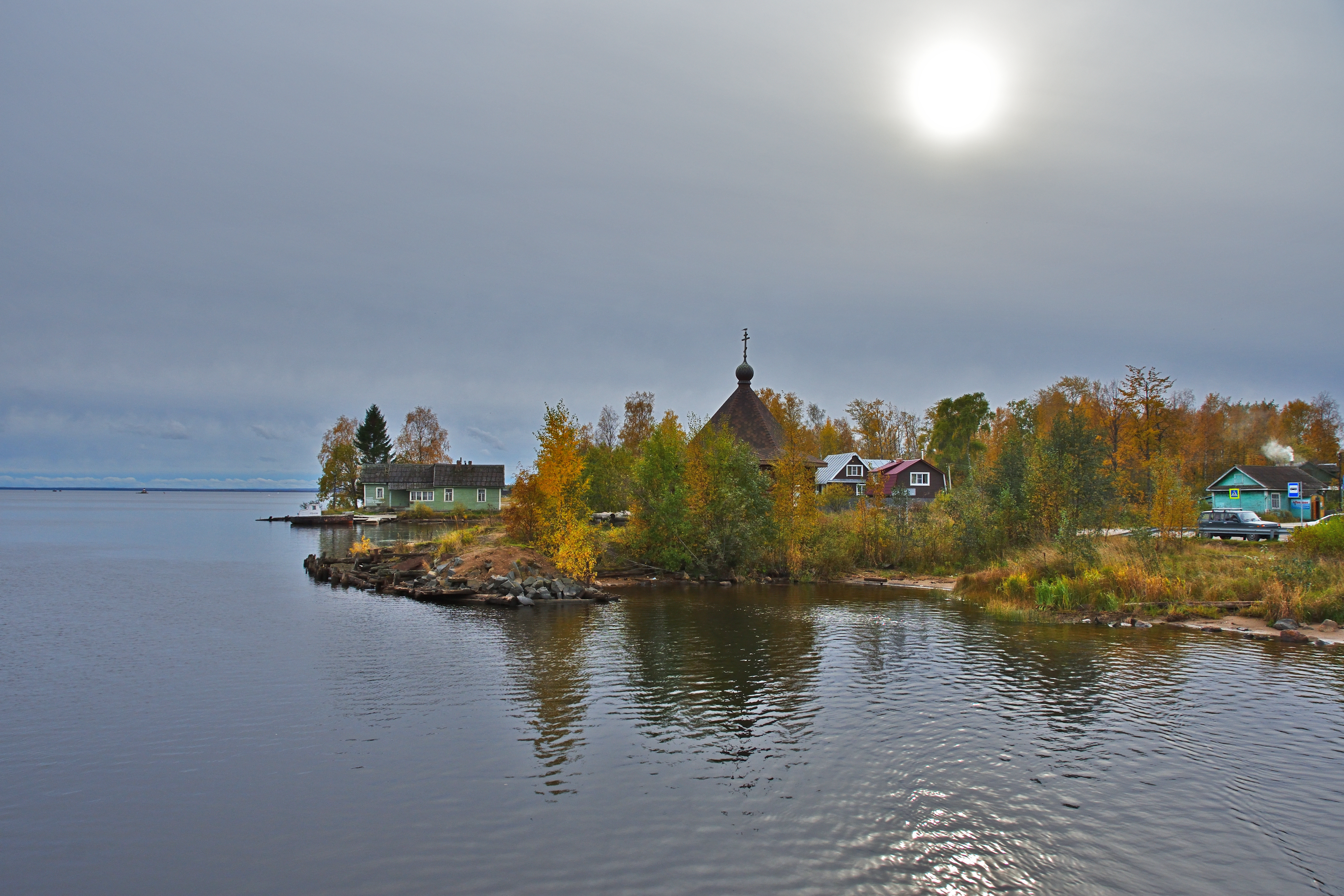

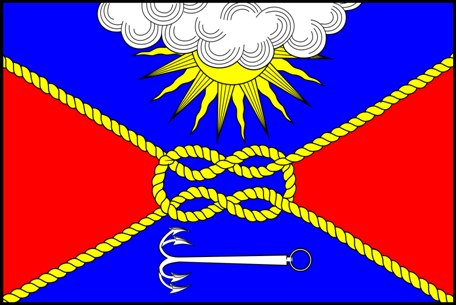
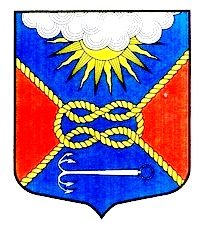
- Flag Coat of arms
- Interactive map of Voznesenye
- Location of Voznesenye Voznesenye (Leningrad Oblast)
- Coordinates: 61°01′N 35°29′E
- Country: Russia
- Federal subject: Leningrad Oblast
- Administrative district: Podporozhsky District
- Selo: 1852
- Urban-type settlement status since: 1935

Population (2010 Census)
  - Total: 2,425
  - Estimate (2024): 2,167 (−10.6%)

Municipal status
  - Municipal district: Podporozhsky Municipal District
  - Urban settlement: Voznesenskoye Urban Settlement
  - Capital of: Voznesenskoye Urban Settlement
- Time zone: UTC+3 (MSK)
- Postal code: 187750
- OKTMO ID: 41636158051

Voznesenye (Russian: Вознесенье, rarely Finnish: Syvärinniska) is an urban locality (an urban-type settlement) in Podporozhsky District of Leningrad Oblast, Russia, located on the banks of the Svir River at the place if flow out of Lake Onega. Municipally, it is incorporated as Voznesenskoye Urban Settlement, one of the four urban settlements in the district. Population: 2,425 (2010 census); 2,817 (2002 census); 3,123 (1989 Soviet census).

== History ==
Voznesenye as a single locality exists since the middle of the 19th century, though the area was populated since at least the 17th century, and after the Mariinsky Water System, a predecessor of the Volga–Baltic Waterway, opened in 1852, it started to play an important role. The name, which means Ascencion, originates from the Ascencion Monastery, which existed in the area in the 17th and the 18th centuries. In the same year Voznesenye got the status of a selo. It was a part of Lodeynopolsky Uyezd of Olonets Governorate. In 1922, Olonets Governorate was abolished, and Lodeynopolsky Uyezd was transferred to Petrograd Governorate (later Leningrad Oblast).

On August 1, 1927, the uyezds in Leningrad Oblast were abolished, and Voznesensky District District with the administrative center in Voznesenye was established. It was a part of Lodeynoye Pole Okrug of Leningrad Oblast and included areas formerly belonging to Lodeynopolsky Uyezd. On August 20, 1935 Voznesenye was granted work settlement status. Between September 1941 and June 1944, during World War II, the settlement was occupied by Finnish troops. On July 18, 1944, it was completely destroyed and subsequently rebuilt. On April 3, 1954 Voznesensky District was abolished and merged into Podporozhsky District.

== Economy ==
=== Industry ===
Voznesenye contains a saw mill and a ship maintenance facility.

=== Transportation ===
The Svir River is navigable and is a part of the Volga–Baltic Waterway, connecting the basins of the Volga and the Neva Rivers. There is regular cruise and cargo traffic along the waterway. The Onega Canal, which bypasses Lake Onega along the southern shore and connects the Svir River and the Vytegra River, has its western end at Voznesenye.

Voznesenye is located on the road connecting Oshtinsky Pogost, just behind the border of Leningrad Oblast, and Petrozavodsk, along the shore of Lake Onega. The road crosses the Svir in Voznesenye by a ferry.

== Culture and recreation ==
There are three recognized cultural heritage monuments of local significance in Voznesenye. These are the monument constructed in 1852 to commemorate the opening of the Mariinsky Water System, as well as two monuments to soldiers fallen in World War II.
