= Paltoga =

Village in Vytegorsky District, Vologda Oblast, Russia

Coordinates: 61°00′37″N 36°09′00″E

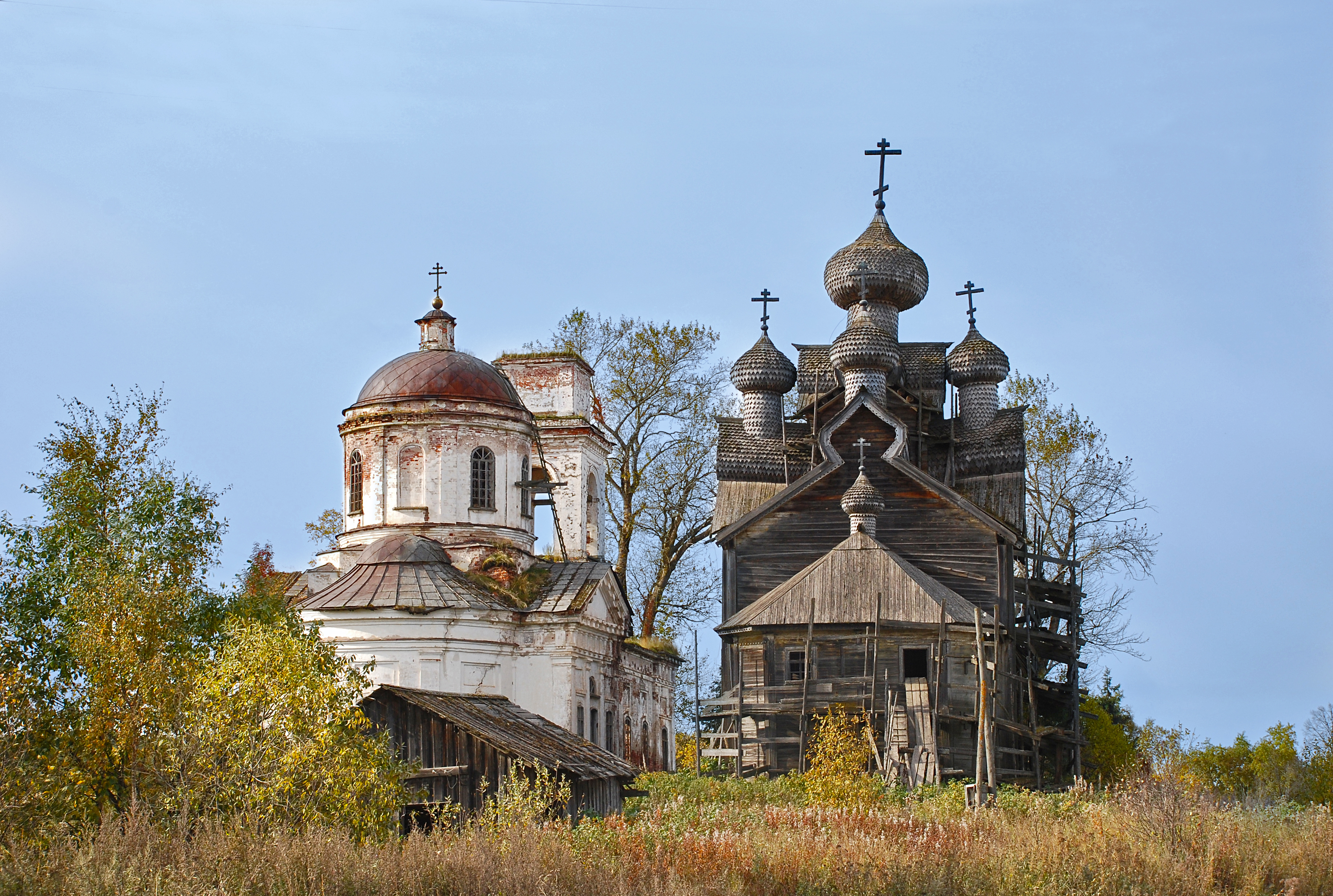
Churches in Paltoga

Paltoga (Russian: Палтога) is a rural locality (a village) in Vytegorsky District of Vologda Oblast, Russia. Population: 295 (2002).

It was founded in 2001 as a merger of several villages.
