= Bolshiye Ivanovskiye =

Bolshiye Ivanovskiye Большие Ивановские
- Village
- Location within Vologda Oblast Location within Russia
- Coordinates: 59°35′N 40°56′E
- Country: Russia
- Region: Vologda Oblast
- District: Sokolsky District
- Time zone: UTC+3:00

Bolshiye Ivanovskiye (Russian: Большие Ивановские) is a rural locality (a village) in Vorobyovskoye Rural Settlement, Sokolsky District, Vologda Oblast, Russia. The population was 27 as of 2002.

== Geography ==
The distance to Sokol is 61 km, to Vorobyovo is 5 km. Bolshaya is the nearest rural locality.
