= Onega Canal =

Coordinates: 61°00′N 35°29′E

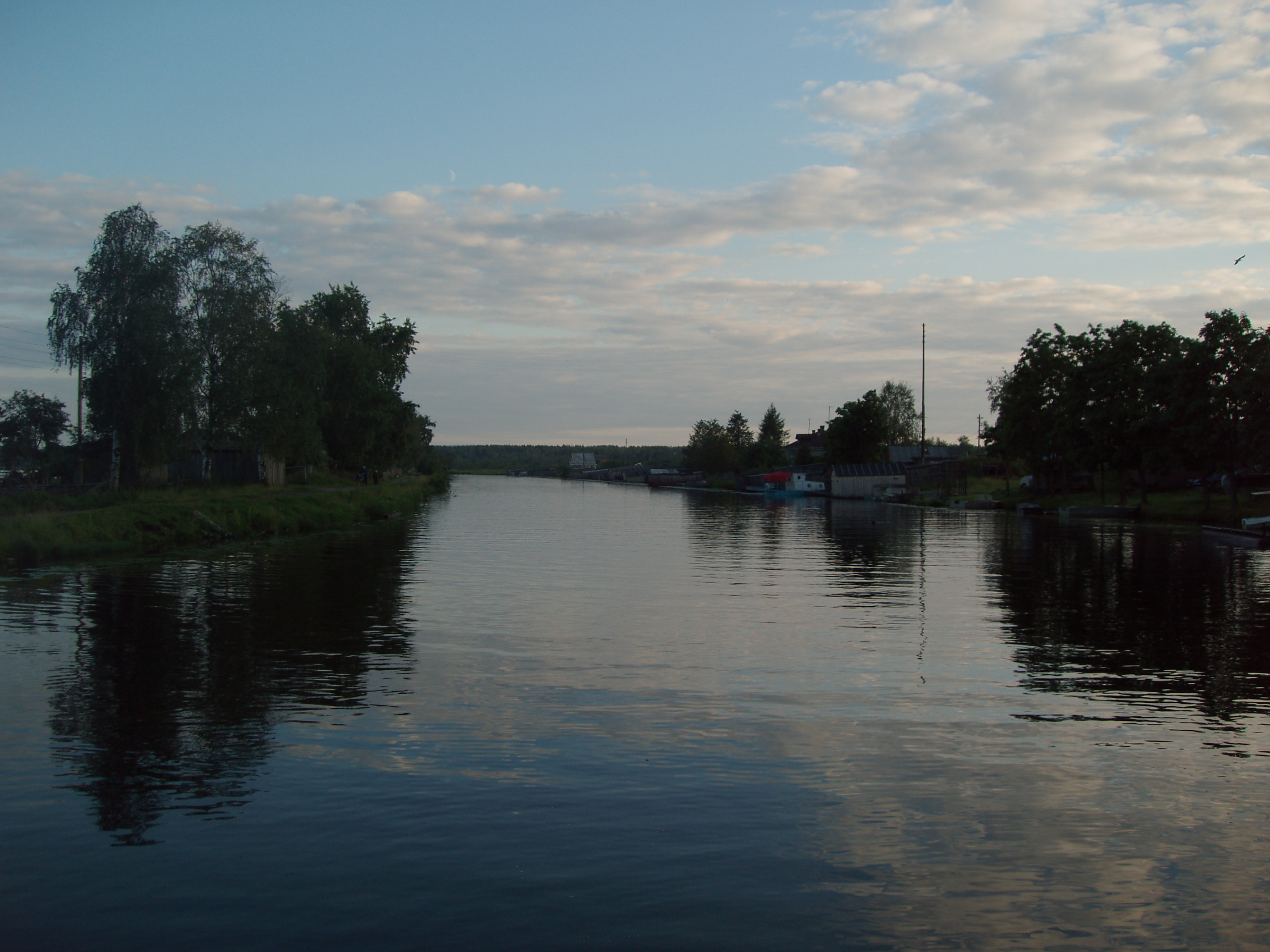
- The Onega Canal at Voznesenye

Specifications
- Locks: None
- Status: Open

History
- Construction began: 1818
- Date completed: 1852

Geography
- Start point: Vytegra River
- End point: Svir River

The Onega Canal (Russian: Онежский канал) is a canal that runs along the southern banks of Lake Onega in Vytegorsky District of Vologda Oblast and Podporozhsky District of Leningrad Oblasts in Russia. It was built 1818–1820 and 1845–1852 as a part of Mariinsk Canal System, to allow small riverboats to avoid Lake Onega, where storms are frequent and where many boats had perished through the centuries. The canal is 69 kilometres (43 mi) long and runs between the Vytegra River in the east and Svir River in the west. It is around 50 metres (160 ft) wide, and lies between 10 metres (33 ft) and 2 kilometres (1.2 mi) from the shores of the lake. At the mouth of the canal, in the selo of Voznesenye, a memorial obelisk has been erected.

The canal lost its significance after Mariinsk Canal System was reconstructed and became Volga–Baltic Waterway. Onezhsky Canal was not reconstructed and became too shallow for larger boats. It is still navigable, but not used for regular navigation.

Two rivers, Vozheroksa and Oshta, tributaries of Lake Onega, cross the canal. 38 kilometres (24 mi) from the Vytegra, the canal crosses Lake Megrskoye, a large freshwater lake. There is weak current in the canal in the direction of the Svir.
