= Burtsevo, Ufimsky District, Republic of Bashkortostan =

Burtsevo Бурцево
- Village
- Location within Bashkortostan Location within Russia
- Coordinates: 54°39′N 56°10′E
- Country: Russia
- Region: Bashkortostan
- District: Ufimsky District
- Time zone: UTC+5:00

Burtsevo (Russian: Бурцево) is a rural locality (a village) in Russko-Yurmashsky Selsoviet, Ufimsky District, Bashkortostan, Russia. The population was 217 as of 2010. There are 18 streets.

== Geography ==
Burtsevo is located 22 km southeast of Ufa (the district's administrative centre) by road. Shmidtovo is the nearest rural locality.
