= Burtsevo, Vologodsky District, Vologda Oblast =

Burtsevo Бурцево
- Village
- Location within Vologda Oblast Location within Russia
- Coordinates: 59°10′N 39°51′E
- Country: Russia
- Region: Vologda Oblast
- District: Vologodsky District
- Time zone: UTC+3:00

Burtsevo (Russian: Бурцево) is a rural locality (a village) in Spasskoye Rural Settlement, Vologodsky District, Vologda Oblast, Russia. The population was 15 as of 2002. There are 23 streets.

== Geography ==
Burtsevo is located 6 km south of Vologda (the district's administrative centre) by road. Byvalovo is the nearest rural locality.
