= Annensky Most =

Annensky Most Анненский Мост
- Selo
- Location within Vologda Oblast Location within Russia
- Coordinates: 60°44′N 37°06′E
- Country: Russia
- Region: Vologda Oblast
- District: Vytegorsky District
- Time zone: UTC+3:00

Annensky Most (Russian: А́нненский Мост) is a rural locality (a selo) in Kemskoye Rural Settlement, Vytegorsky District, Vologda Oblast, Russia. The population was 2,166 as of 2002. There are 32 streets.

== Geography ==
Annensky Most is located 62 km southeast of Vytegra (the district's administrative centre) by road. Artyukovo is the nearest rural locality.
