= Ust-Alexeyevo =

Ust-Alexeyevo Усть-Алексеево
- Selo
- Location within Vologda Oblast Location within Russia
- Coordinates: 60°27′N 46°30′E
- Country: Russia
- Region: Vologda Oblast
- District: Velikoustyugsky District
- Time zone: UTC+3:00

Ust-Alexeyevo (Russian: Усть-Алексеево) is a rural locality (a selo) and the administrative center of Ust-Alexeyevskoye Rural Settlement, Velikoustyugsky District, Vologda Oblast, Russia. The population was 1,147 as of 2002. There are 19 streets.

== Geography ==
Ust-Alexeyevo is located 54 km southeast of Veliky Ustyug (the district's administrative centre) by road. Gorbishchevo is the nearest rural locality.
