= Korotovo =

Korotovo Коротово
- Village
- Location within Vologda Oblast Location within Russia
- Coordinates: 58°57′N 37°27′E
- Country: Russia
- Region: Vologda Oblast
- District: Cherepovetsky District
- Time zone: UTC+3:00

Korotovo (Russian: Коротово) is a rural locality (a village) and the administrative center of Korotovskoye Rural Settlement, Cherepovetsky District, Vologda Oblast, Russia. The population was 654 as of 2010. There are 14 streets.

== Geography ==
Korotovo is located 64 km (40 mi) southwest of Cherepovets (the district's administrative centre) by road. Sosnovka is the nearest rural locality.
