= Burtsevo, Cherepovetsky District, Vologda Oblast =

Burtsevo Бурцево
- Village
- Location within Vologda Oblast Location within Russia
- Coordinates: 59°02′N 38°07′E
- Country: Russia
- Region: Vologda Oblast
- District: Cherepovetsky District
- Time zone: UTC+3:00

Burtsevo (Russian: Бурцево) is a rural locality (a village) in Yugskoye Rural Settlement, Cherepovetsky District, Vologda Oblast, Russia. The population was 22 as of 2002. There are 3 streets.

== Geography ==
Burtsevo is located 23 km (14 mi) southeast of Cherepovets (the district's administrative centre) by road. Doronino is the nearest rural locality.
