= Burtsevo, Gryazovetsky District, Vologda Oblast =

Burtsevo Бурцево
- Village
- Location within Vologda Oblast Location within Russia
- Coordinates: 58°54′N 40°16′E
- Country: Russia
- Region: Vologda Oblast
- District: Gryazovetsky District
- Time zone: UTC+3:00

Burtsevo (Russian: Бурцево) is a rural locality (a village) in Pertsevskoye Rural Settlement, Gryazovetsky District, Vologda Oblast, Russia. The population was 6 as of 2002.

== Geography ==
Burtsevo is located 4 km (2.5 mi) northeast of Gryazovets (the district's administrative centre) by road. Gryazovets is the nearest rural locality.
