= Vytegra (river) =

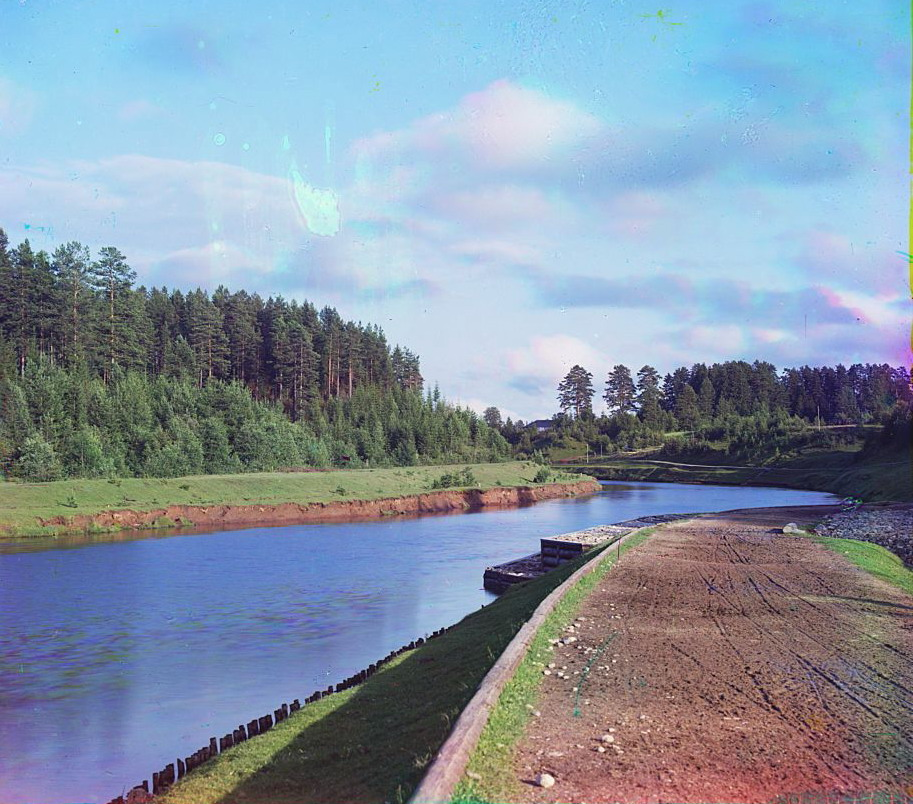
- Native name: Вытегра (Russian)

Location
- Country: Russia

Physical characteristics
- Source: Lake Matkozero
- Mouth: Lake Onega
  - coordinates: 61°05′52″N 36°17′10″E
  - elevation: 33 m (108 ft)
- Length: 64 km (40 mi)
- Basin size: 1,670 km^{2} (640 sq mi)
- Discharge
  - average: 11 m^{3}/s (390 cu ft/s)

Basin features
- Progression: Lake Onega→ Svir→ Lake Ladoga→ Neva→ Gulf of Finland

The Vytegra (Russian: Вытегра, IPA: [ˈvɨtʲɪɡrə]) is a river in Vytegorsky District of Vologda Oblast in Russia. It nominally flows out of Lake Matkozero and is a tributary of Lake Onega. It is 64-kilometer (40 mi) long, and the area of its basin 1,670 square kilometers (640 sq mi). The principal tributary is the Tagazhma (left).

The river is a part of the Volga–Baltic Waterway. When the canal was under construction, Lake Matkozero was used to deposit the soil, and it does not exist anymore. The Vytegra is connected with the valley of the Kovzha by Novomariinsky Canal in the south. Close to the mouth, the Onega Canal branches off west to bypass Lake Onega and to connect the Vytegra with the Svir. Upstream of the town of Vytegra, the Vytegorsky Reservoir was filled.

The whole river basin of the Vychegda is located in the central part of Vytegorsky District.

The valley of the Vytegra is populated, in particular, the town of Vytegra is located on both banks of the river. The names of both Vytegra and Vytegorsky District originates from the name of the river.
