= Kema (river) =

Coordinates: 60°19′57″N 37°12′07″E

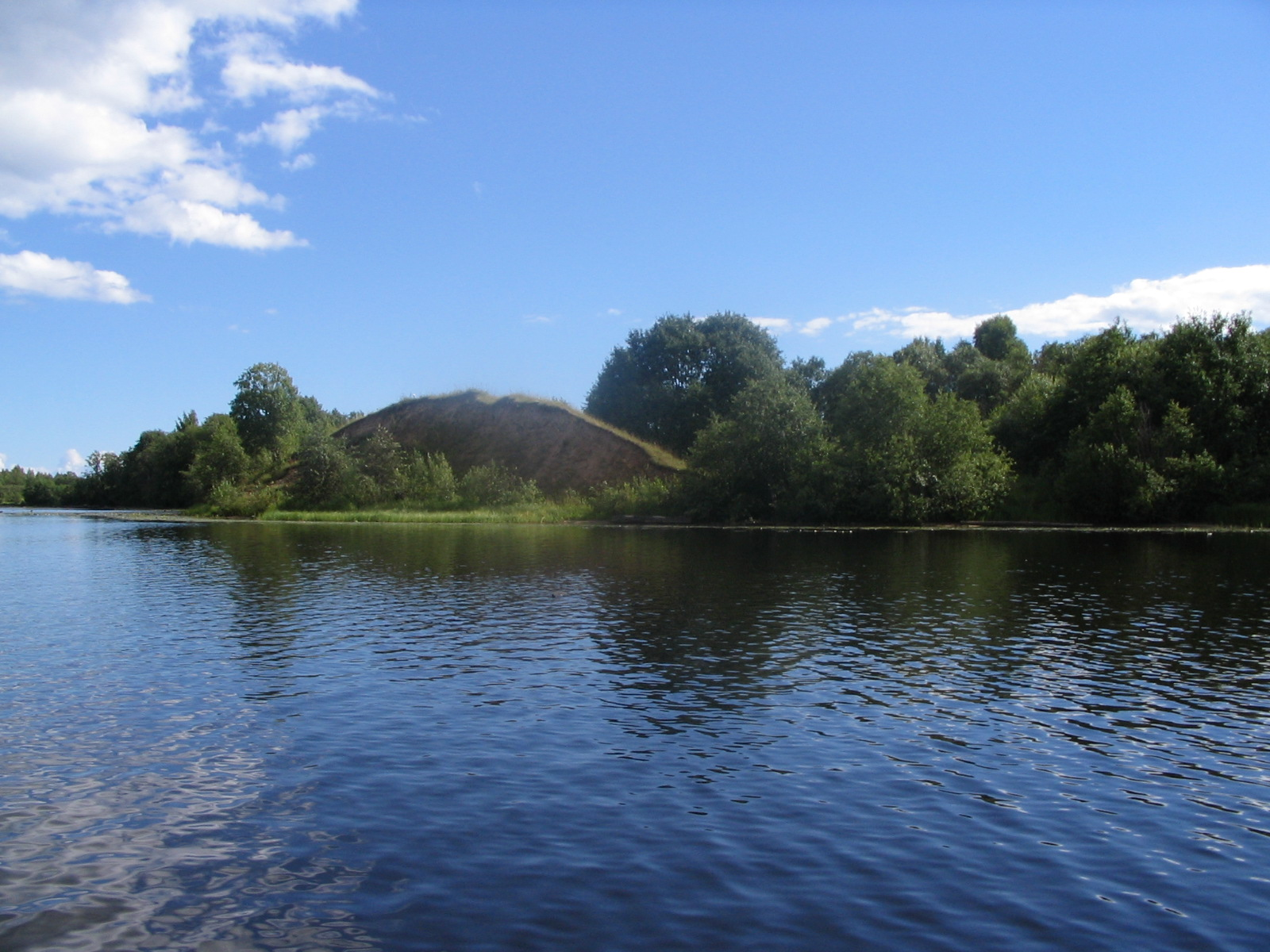
- The lower course of the Kema
- Native name: Ке́ма (Russian)

Location
- Country: Russia

Physical characteristics
- Source
  - location: Lake Kemskoye
  - elevation: 164 metres (538 ft)
- Mouth
  - location: Lake Beloye
  - elevation: 113 metres (371 ft)
- Length: 150 km (93 mi)
- Basin size: 4,480 km^{2} (1,730 sq mi)
- Discharge
  - average: 44.8 cubic metres per second (1,580 cu ft/s)

Basin features
- Progression: Lake Beloye→ Sheksna→ Volga→ Caspian Sea

Map of the Rybinsk Reservoir basin. The Kema is shown on the map.

The Kema (Russian: Ке́ма) is a river in the Vytegorsky and Vashkinsky districts of Vologda Oblast in Russia. It flows out of Lake Kemskoye and is a tributary of Lake Beloye. It is 150 kilometres (93 mi) long, and the area of its basin 4,480 square kilometres (1,730 sq mi). The main tributary is the Indomanka (left).

The source of the Kema is Lake Kemskoye in the north of Vytegorsky District. The river flows in the general direction south and enters Vashkinsky District. It accepts the Indomanka River from the left and turns southwest. The lower course of the river is a water reservoir.

The Kema belongs to the river basins of the Sheksna, the Volga, and the basin of the Caspian Sea. The river basin of the Kema comprises the eastern part of Vytegorsky District, the northern and the eastern parts of Vashkinsky District, and minor areas in Kargopolsky District of Arkhangelsk Oblast. The biggest river belonging to the basin of the Kema is the Soyda River, a tributary of Lake Kemskoye.

The Kema River freezes up in early November and stays icebound until late April.

Until the 1990s, the Kema was used for timber rafting.
