= Lezha, Vologda Oblast =

Lezha Лежа
- Settlement
- Location within Vologda Oblast Location within Russia
- Coordinates: 58°55′N 40°45′E
- Country: Russia
- Region: Vologda Oblast
- District: Gryazovetsky District
- Time zone: UTC+3:00

Lezha (Russian: Лежа) is a rural locality (a settlement) in Sidorovskoye Rural Settlement, Gryazovetsky District, Vologda Oblast, Russia. The population was 343 as of 2002. There are 7 streets.

== Geography ==
The distance to Gryazovets is 35 km (22 mi), to Sidorovo is 23 km. Zasechnoye is the nearest rural locality.
