= Vytegorsky Uyezd =

Vytegorsky Uyezd (Вытегорский уезд) was one of the subdivisions of the Olonets Governorate of the Russian Empire. It was situated in the eastern part of the governorate. Its administrative centre was Vytegra.

== Demographics ==
At the time of the Russian Empire Census of 1897, Vytegorsky Uyezd had a population of 55,999. Of these, 98.5% spoke Russian, 0.9% Finnish, 0.3% Yiddish, 0.1% Polish and 0.1% Belarusian as their native language.
