= Sokol, Vologda Oblast =

Town in Vologda Oblast, Russia

Sokol Сокол
- Town
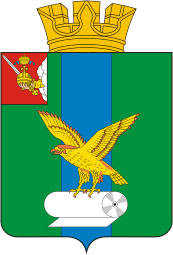
- Coat of arms
- Interactive map of Sokol
- Location of Sokol Sokol (Vologda Oblast)
- Coordinates: 59°28′N 40°07′E
- Country: Russia
- Federal subject: Vologda Oblast
- Known since: at least 1615
- Town status since: 1932
- Elevation: 115 m (377 ft)

Population (2010 Census)
  - Total: 38,452
  - Estimate (2023): 34,298 (−10.8%)

Administrative status
  - Subordinated to: town of oblast significance of Sokol
  - Capital of: Sokolsky District, town of oblast significance of Sokol

Municipal status
  - Municipal district: Sokolsky Municipal District
  - Urban settlement: Sokol Urban Settlement
  - Capital of: Sokolsky Municipal District, Sokol Urban Settlement
- Time zone: UTC+3 (MSK)
- Postal codes: 162129, 162130, 162132, 162134–162136, 162138, 162139
- OKTMO ID: 19638101001
- Website: www.sokoladm.ru

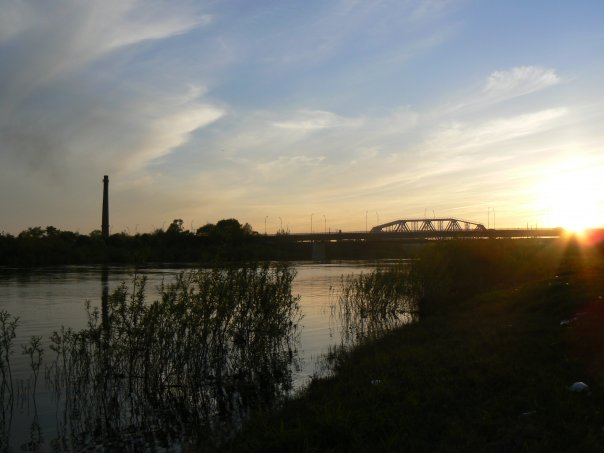
Bridges over the Sukhona River

Sokol (Russian: Со́кол) is a town in the center of Vologda Oblast, Russia, located on both banks of the Sukhona River. Population: 34,742 (2021 census); 38,452 (2010 census); 43,042 (2002 census); 46,604 (1989 Soviet census)..

Historical population
Year	Pop.	±%
1939	29,800	—
1959	41,709	+40.0%
1970	48,253	+15.7%
1979	45,296	−6.1%
1989	46,604	+2.9%
2002	43,042	−7.6%
2010	38,452	−10.7%
2021	34,742	−9.6%
Source: Census data

== History ==
The village of Sokolovo (Соколово) existed on this location since at least 1615. Since 1796, the village was part of Kadnikovsky Uyezd of Vologda Governorate. In 1897, a paper mill was built near the village and Sokolovo became the primary place of residence of the employees of the mill.

In November 1923, the Vologda Executive Committee decreed to create Sverdlovsko-Sukhonsky District with the administrative center in the settlement of Sokol; however, the decision was not approved by the central authorities, and the district was never created.

On July 15, 1929, the uyezds were abolished, the governorates merged into Northern Krai, and Sverdlovsky District with the administrative center in the work settlement of Sokol was established among others. It became a part of Vologda Okrug of Northern Krai. In 1932, Sokol was granted town status, and the district was renamed Sokolsky.

== Administrative and municipal status ==
Within the framework of administrative divisions, Sokol serves as the administrative center of Sokolsky District, even though it is not a part of it. As an administrative division, it is incorporated separately as the town of oblast significance of Sokol (one of the four in the oblast)—an administrative unit with the status equal to that of the districts. As a municipal division, the town of oblast significance of Sokol is incorporated within Sokolsky Municipal District as Sokol Urban Settlement.

== Economy ==
=== Industry ===
The town is home to two large paper mills (Sukhonsky Tsellyulozno-Bumazhny Kombinat and Sokolsky Tsellyulozno-Bumazhny Kombinat).

=== Transportation ===
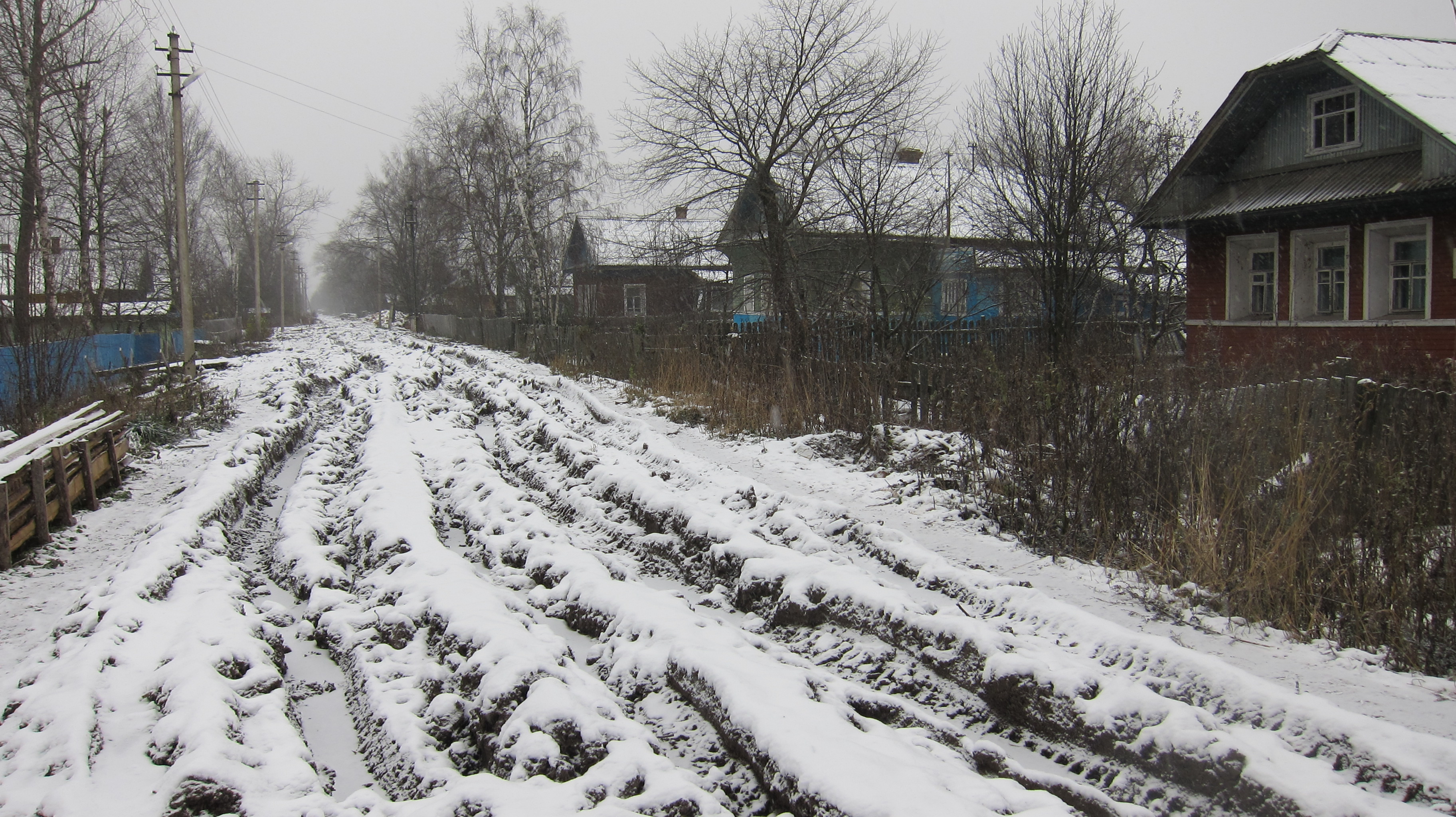
Voroshilova Street rasputitsa (muddy conditions) in October 2012

Sukhona railway station on the railway connecting Vologda and Arkhangelsk is located in Sokol.

One of the principal highways in Russia, M8, which connects Moscow and Arkhangelsk, crosses Sokolsky District passing Sokol. Other roads connect Sokol with Kharovsk and Ustye. There are also local roads, with the bus traffic originating from Sokol.

Sukhona is navigable in Sokol; however, there is no passenger navigation.

== Culture and recreation ==
Sokol hosts the Sokol District Museum, one of the two museums in Sokolsky District.

== International relations ==
=== Twin towns and sister cities ===
Sokol is twinned with:

- Tutayev, Russia
- Valkeakoski, Finland
