= Vytegorsky District =

Vytegorsky District Вытегорский район (Russian)
- District
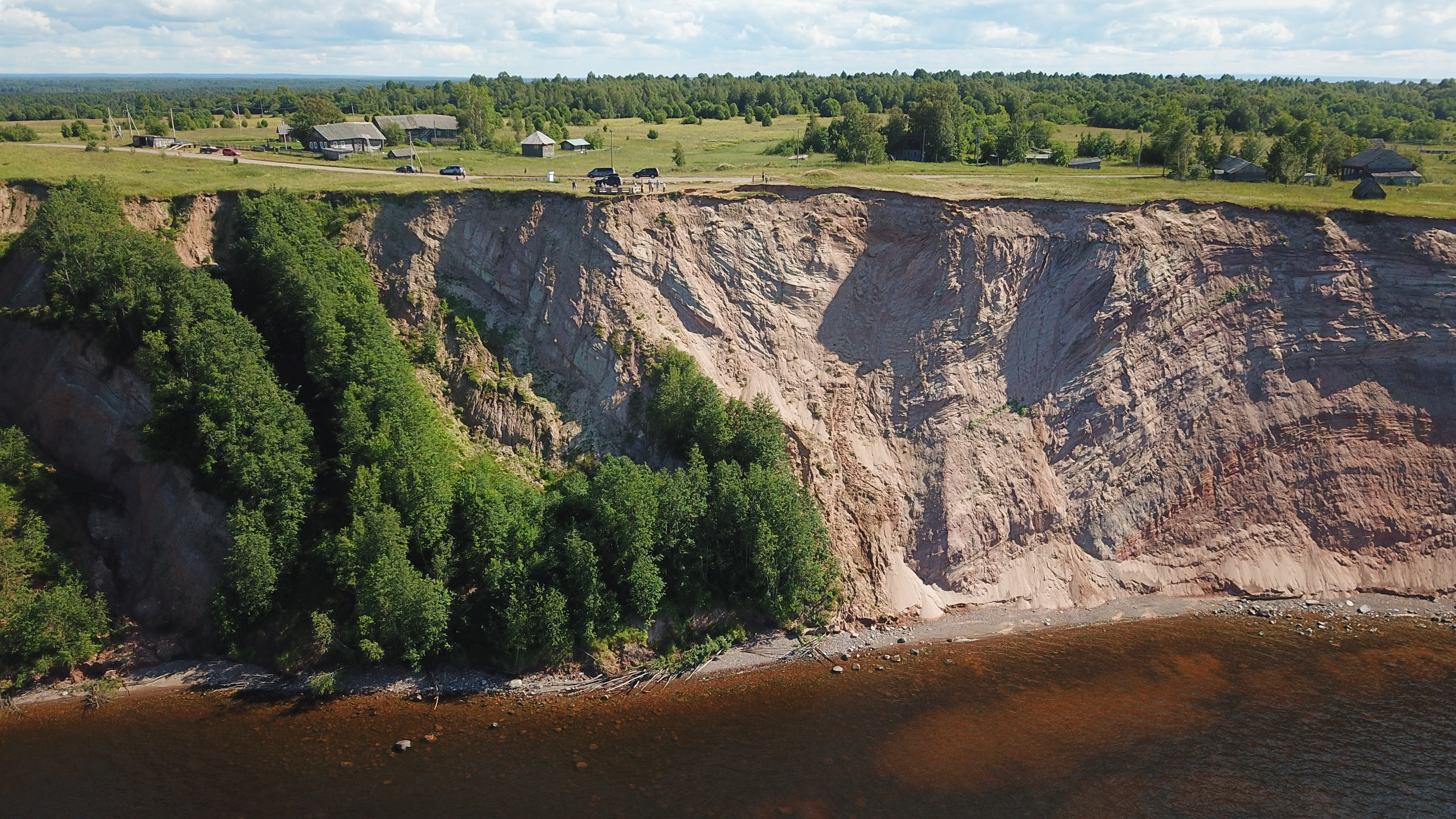
- Andoma Hill, the formation on the coast of Lake Onega close to Andomsky Pogost

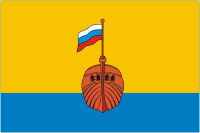
- Flag Coat of arms
- Location of Vytegorsky District in Vologda Oblast
- Coordinates: 59°52′N 38°23′E
- Country: Russia
- Federal subject: Vologda Oblast
- Established: August 1, 1927
- Administrative center: Vytegra

Area
  - Total: 13,100 km^{2} (5,100 sq mi)

Population (2010 Census)
  - Total: 27,139
  - Density: 2.07/km^{2} (5.37/sq mi)
  - Urban: 38.6%
  - Rural: 61.4%

Administrative structure
  - Administrative divisions: 1 Towns of district significance, 15 Selsoviets
  - Inhabited localities: 1 cities/towns, 207 rural localities

Municipal structure
  - Municipally incorporated as: Vytegorsky Municipal District
  - Municipal divisions: 1 urban settlements, 10 rural settlements
- Time zone: UTC+3 (MSK)
- OKTMO ID: 19622000
- Website: http://www.vytegra-adm.ru/

Vytegorsky District (Russian: Вытего́рский райо́н) is an administrative and municipal district (raion), one of the twenty-six in Vologda Oblast, Russia. It is located in the northwest of the oblast and borders with Pudozhsky District of the Republic of Karelia in the north, Kargopolsky District of Arkhangelsk Oblast in the east, Kirillovsky, Vashkinsky, and Belozersky Districts in the southeast, Vologodsky District in the southeast, Babayevsky District in the southwest, and with Podporozhsky District of Leningrad Oblast in the west. The area of the district is 13,100 square kilometers (5,100 sq mi), making it the largest district in Vologda Oblast. Its administrative center is the town of Vytegra. Population: 27,139 (2010 census); 31,757 (2002 Census); 37,792 (1989 Soviet census). The population of Vytegra accounts for 38.6% of the district's total population.

== Geography ==
The northwestern border of the district is the shore of Lake Onega, and the area of the district is divided between several drainage basins. The western and the central parts belong to the basins of the rivers flowing into Lake Onega, most notably the Vytegra, the Vodla, the Andoma, and the Megra. Lake Onega belongs to the basin of the Neva River. From the east, the Andoma Hills separate the basin of Lake Onega from the basins of the Kovzha and the Kema Rivers, which are the tributaries of Lake Beloye and thus belong to the basin of the Volga. The Vepsian Upland rises in the western part with 304 metres (997 ft) high Malgora hill, the highest point of the district. Minor areas in the northeast of the district are in the basin of Lake Lacha, itself in the basin of the Onega River. In the northeast of the district there is a point which is a triple divide of the basins of the Neva, the Volga, and the Onega, and thus the basins of the Atlantic Ocean, the Arctic Ocean, and the endorheic basins of the interior of Eurasia. This is one of the very few such triple divides in the world and the only one in Russia.

There are many lakes in the district, many of which are of glacial origin. The biggest lakes are Lake Kovzhskoye, Lake Kemskoye, Lake Soydozero, and Lake Kushtozero in the basin of Lake Beloye, and Lake Megrskoye, Lake Tudozero, Lake Lukhtozero, and Lake Shimozero in the basin of Lake Onega.

Most of the area of the district is covered by coniferous forests (taiga). There are many swamps, especially in the southwest and the east of the district.

== History ==
The name probably originates from Finnic language (as evidenced by the suffix "-егра"), however, the exact meaning is unknown.

The area was populated by Finnic peoples and then colonized by the Novgorod Republic. Vytegra was first mentioned in 1496. It was located on the trade route from the Volga River to Lake Onega, and later on the route from Saint Petersburg to Arkhangelsk.

In the course of the administrative reform carried out in 1708 by Peter the Great, the area was included into Ingermanland Governorate (known from 1710 as Saint Petersburg Governorate). In 1727, it was transferred to the newly established Novgorod Governorate. In 1773, Vytegra was chartered, and in 1776, Vytegorsky Uyezd was established as one of the uyezds of newly established Novgorod Viceroyalty. It became a part of Olonets Oblast.

A sequence of administrative reforms followed. In 1781, Olonets Oblast was transferred to Saint Petersburg Governorate, and in 1784, it was transformed into an independent administrative unit, Olonets Viceroyalty. In 1785, Vytegorsky Uyezd was abolished and merged into Pudozhsky Uyezd. In 1799, Olonets Viceroyalty was abolished and divided between Novgorod and Arkhangelsk Governorates. Vytegorsky Uyezd was returned to Novgorod Governorate. In 1801, Olonets Governorate was established, and Vytegorsky Uyezd became one of several uyezds of the governorate.

In 1922, Olonets Governorate was abolished, and Vytegorsky Uyezd was transferred to Petrograd Governorate (later Leningrad Oblast), with the exception of three volosts, which were transferred to Kargopolsky Uyezd of Vologda Governorate. On February 7, 1927, Vytegorsky Uyezd was abolished and merged into Lodeynopolsky Uyezd of Leningrad Oblast.

On August 1, 1927, the uyezds in Leningrad Oblast were abolished. On the territory of former Vytegorsky Uyezd four districts were established: Vytegorsky District (with the administrative center in Vytegra), Andomsky District (with the administrative center in the selo of Andomsky Pogost), Kovzhinsky District (with the administrative center in the selo of Annensky Most), and Oshtinsky District (with the administrative center in the selo of Oshta). The four districts were a part of Lodeynoye Pole Okrug of Leningrad Oblast. On September 23, 1937, all four districts were transferred to newly established Vologda Oblast.

During World War II, parts of Oshtinsky District were the only areas of Vologda Oblast to be occupied by Finnish troops. The Finnish advance was stopped in October 1941, but the occupation continued until June 1944, when the Soviet Army started to advance.

Andomsky, Oshtinsky, and Kovzhinsky Districts were all abolished in the 1950s. On December 12, 1955, Oshtinsky District was divided between Vytegorsky and Borisovo-Sudsky Districts. On October 17, 1957, Andomsky District was merged into Vytegorsky District. In 1959, Kovzhinsky District was split between Vashkinsky and Vytegorsky Districts.

== Demographics ==
Vytegorsky District is one of the areas traditionally populated by Vepsians. The Vepsians living in the district speak the central group of Veps dialects.

== Economy ==
=== Industry ===
The economy of the district is based on timber industry. There are also food industry enterprises. In 1975, limestone production started in the selo of Annensky Most. The enterprise, Bely Ruchey Ore Administration, is owned by the Severstal steel plant, located in Cherepovets, and extracted limestone was used for steel production.

=== Agriculture ===
The agriculture in the district specializes in meat and milk production and has been steadily declining since the 1990s.

=== Transportation ===
Vytegra is a road junction where a partially paved road connecting to Podporozhye in Leningrad Oblast branches off from the highway connecting Vologda with Medvezhyegorsk in the Republic of Karelia via Lipin Bor and Pudozh. There is bus traffic.

The Volga–Baltic Waterway, connecting the basins of the Volga and the Neva Rivers, crosses the district from south to north, following the valley of the Kovzha River in the south, the Novomariinsky Canal, and the Vytegra River in the north. It also bypasses Lake Onega along the Onega Canal. There is regular cruise and cargo traffic along the waterway. The passenger navigation on Lake Onega, connecting Vytegra with Petrozavodsk, has been discontinued.

The Vytegra Airport in 2011 was not served by regular passenger flights.

== Culture and recreation ==
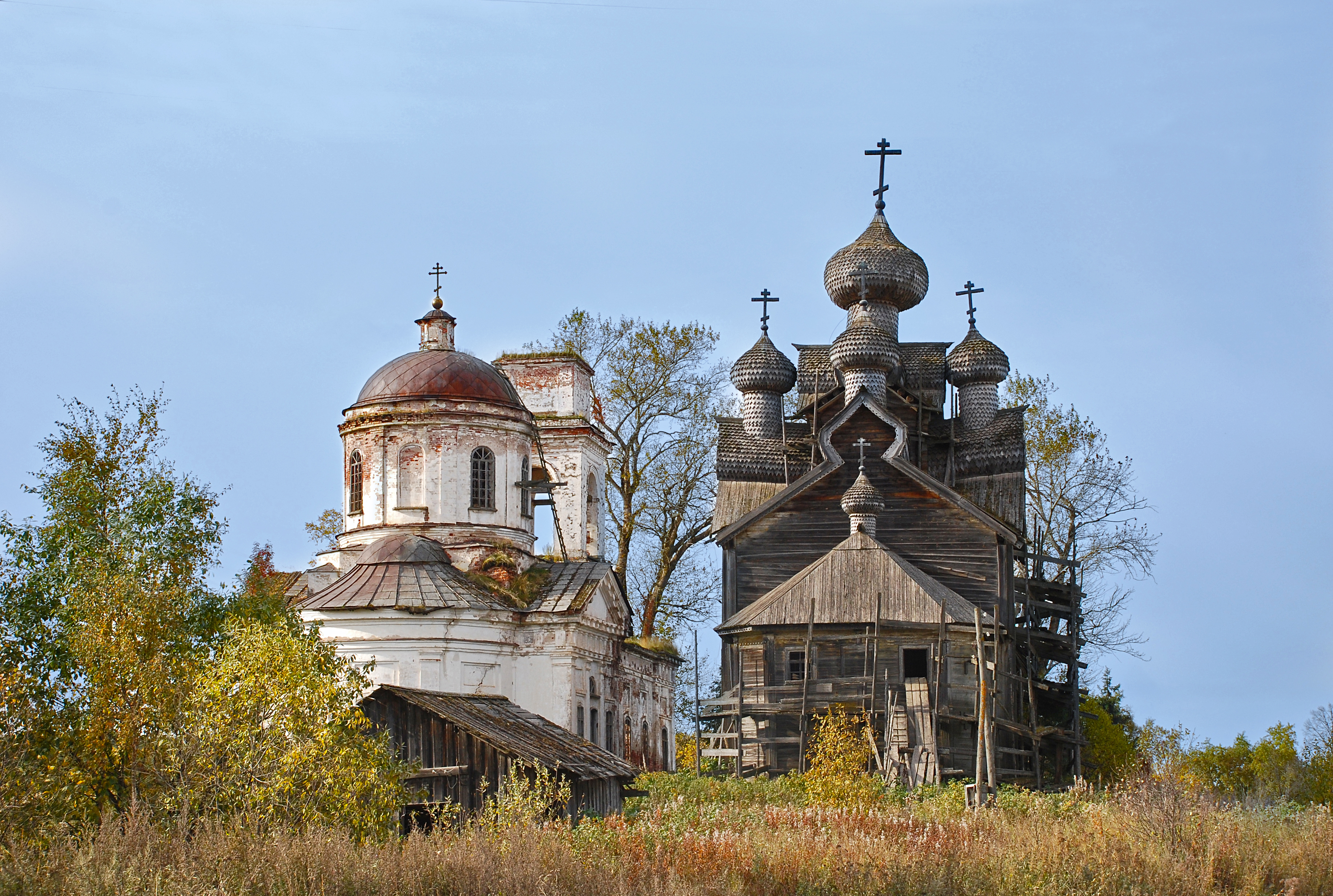
The church complex in Paltoga: The Epiphany Church (right) and the Church of Our Lady of the Sign (left)

The district contains 8 objects classified as cultural and historical heritage by Russian Federal law, and additionally 170 objects (66 of them located in Vytegra) classified as cultural and historical heritage of local importance. The cultural heritage monuments of federal significance are the remains of the Mariinsky Waterway from the early 19th century, the wooden Epiphany Church in Paltoga, the wooden St. Iliya Church of Saminsky Pogost, and the wooden Assumption Church in Devyatiny.

The Vytegorsky District Museum is located in Vytegra. Another museum in Vytegra is located in the B440 Russian submarine of the Foxtrot class.
