= Vytegra =

Town in Vologda Oblast, Russia

Vytegra Вытегра
- Town
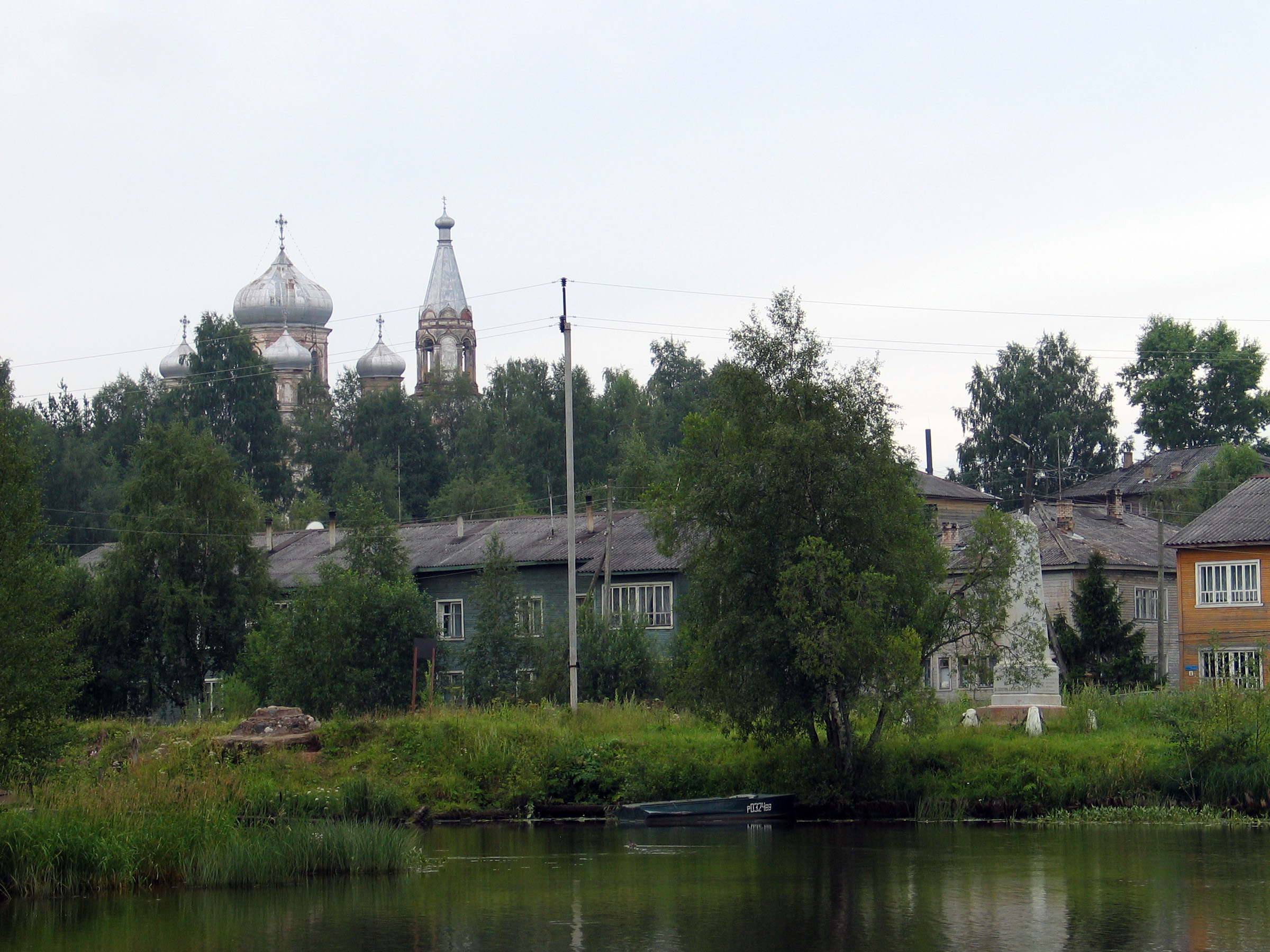
- View of Vytegra

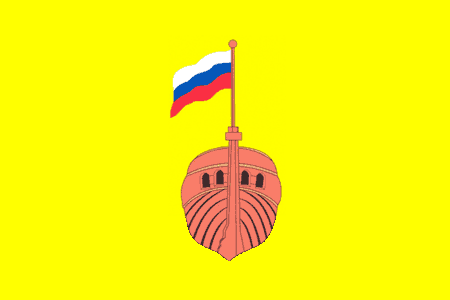
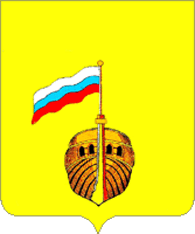
- Flag Coat of arms
- Interactive map of Vytegra
- Location of Vytegra Vytegra (Vologda Oblast)
- Coordinates: 61°00′N 36°27′E
- Country: Russia
- Federal subject: Vologda Oblast
- Administrative district: Vytegorsky District
- Town of district significanceSelsoviet: Vytegra
- First mentioned: 1496
- Town status since: 1773
- Elevation: 50 m (160 ft)

Population (2010 Census)
  - Total: 10,488
  - Estimate (2023): 10,292 (−1.9%)

Administrative status
  - Capital of: Vytegorsky District, town of district significance of Vytegra

Municipal status
  - Municipal district: Vytegorsky Municipal District
  - Urban settlement: Vytegra Urban Settlement
  - Capital of: Vytegorsky Municipal District, Vytegra Urban Settlement
- Time zone: UTC+3 (MSK)
- Postal codes: 162900, 162969
- OKTMO ID: 19622101001

Vytegra (Russian: Вы́тегра, IPA: [ˈvɨtʲɪɡrə]) is a town and the administrative center of Vytegorsky District in Vologda Oblast, Russia, located along the shores of the Vytegra River on Volga–Baltic Waterway, 315 kilometers (196 mi) northwest of Vologda, the administrative center of the oblast. Population: 10,488 (2010 census); 11,400 (2002 census); 12,905 (1989 Soviet census).

== History ==
It was first mentioned in 1496 as Vytegorsky Pogost (Вытегорский Погост). Since 1710, it was known as Vyangi (Вянги), located at the confluence of the Vytegra and the Vyangi Rivers.

In the course of the administrative reform carried out in 1708 by Peter the Great, Vyangi was included into Ingermanland Governorate (known from 1710 as Saint Petersburg Governorate). In 1715, a shipyard was founded on the Vytegra River upstream from Vyangi, which remained in operation until 1847.

In 1773, Vyangi was chartered and renamed Vytegra and in 1776 Vytegorsky Uyezd was established as one of the uyezds of Olonets Province in the newly established Novgorod Viceroyalty. A sequence of administrative reforms followed. In 1781, Olonets Oblast was transferred to Saint Petersburg Governorate, and in 1784, it was transformed into an independent administrative unit, Olonets Viceroyalty. In 1785, Vytegorsky Uyezd was abolished and merged into Pudozhsky Uyezd. In 1799, Olonets Viveroyalty was abolished and divided between Novgorod and Arkhangelsk Governorates. Vytegorsky Uyezd returned to Novgorod Governorate. In 1801, Olonets Governorate was established, and Vytegorsky Uyezd became one of its several uyezds.

In 1922, Olonets Governorate was abolished and Vytegra was transferred to Petrograd Governorate (later Leningrad Oblast). On August 1, 1927, the uyezds in Leningrad Oblast were abolished and Vytegorsky District with the administrative center in Vytegra was established as a part of Lodeynoye Pole Okrug of Leningrad Oblast. On September 23, 1937, it was transferred to newly established Vologda Oblast.

During World War II, Finnish troops occupied the western part of Oshtinsky District and in October 1941, prepared an advance to Vytegra. The Finnish advance was stopped by the Red Army, but the occupation continued until June 1944. Vytegra was under threat for these two and a half years, but was never occupied.

== Administrative and municipal status ==
Within the framework of administrative divisions, Vytegra serves as the administrative center of Vytegorsky District. As an administrative division, it is incorporated within Vytegorsky District as the town of district significance of Vytegra. As a municipal division, the town of district significance of Vytegra is incorporated within Vytegorsky Municipal District as Vytegra Urban Settlement.

== Economy ==
=== Industry ===
There is a butter-making, a fish-processing, and an automotive and tractor overhaul and repair plants in the town, as well as several metalworking enterprises.

=== Transportation ===
Located at the crossing of a waterway connecting central Russia with Lake Onega and a road connecting St. Petersburg with Arkhangelsk, Vytegra was an important transit point for cargo. The idea to build a canal connecting the drainage basins of the Neva and the Volga Rivers was already discussed by Peter the Great, but the canal, formerly the Mariinsky System, was only built in 1810. In the 20th century, it was reconstructed and renamed the Volga–Baltic Waterway. The waterway passes through the town, following the course of the Vytegra River. The passenger navigation on Lake Onega, connecting Vytegra with Petrozavodsk, has been discontinued.

Vytegra is a road junction where a partially paved road connecting to Podporozhye in Leningrad Oblast branches off from the highway connecting Vologda with Medvezhyegorsk in the Republic of Karelia via Lipin Bor and Pudozh. There is bus traffic originating from Vytegra.

The Vytegra Airport in 2011 was not served by regular passenger flights.

== Culture and recreation ==
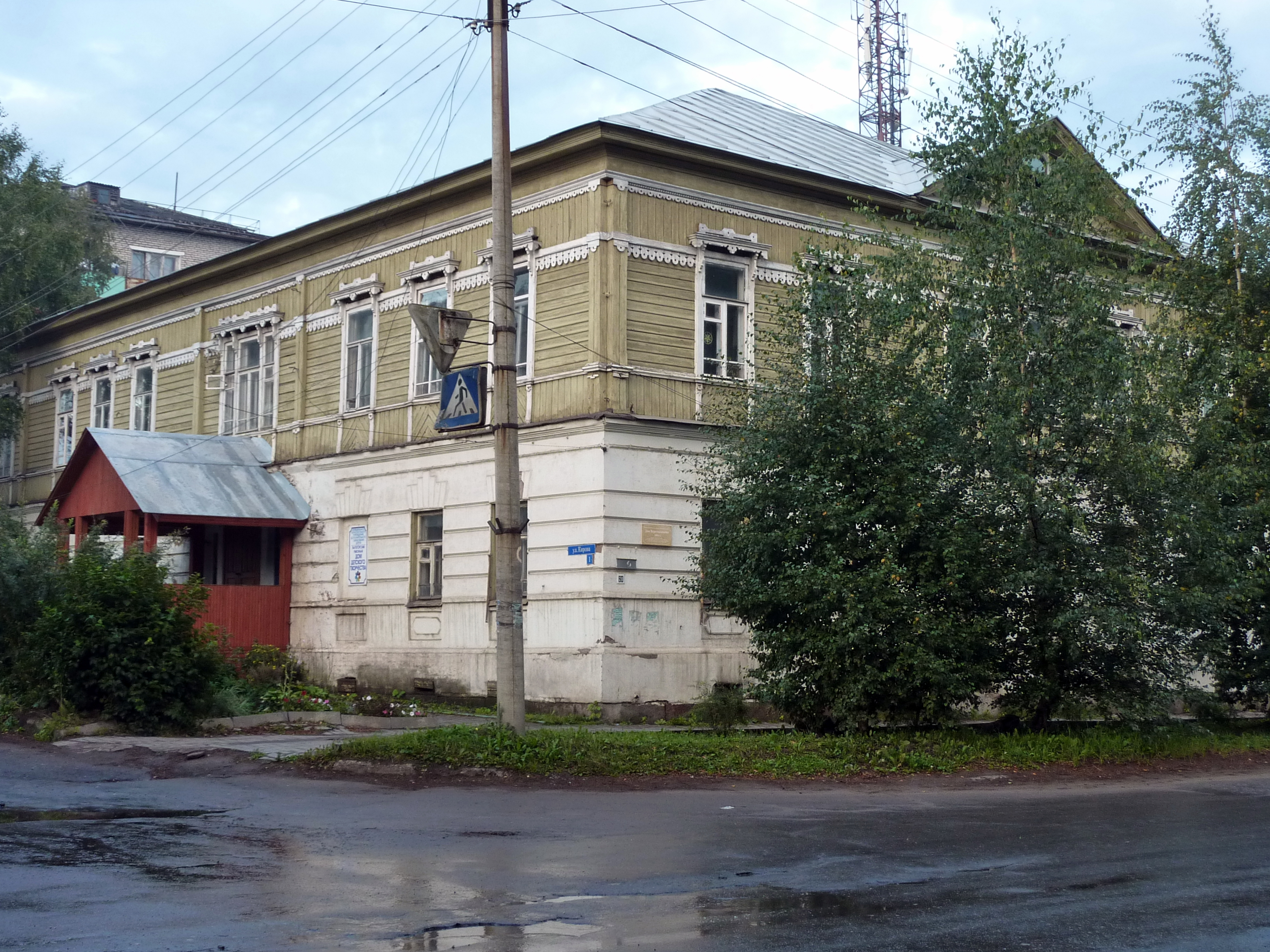
The Veretennikov House in Vytegra

Vytegra contains three objects classified as cultural and historical heritage by Russian Federal law and additionally sixty-six objects classified as cultural and historical heritage of local importance. The cultural heritage monuments of the federal significance are the remains of the Mariinsky Waterway from the early 19th century.

The Vytegorsky District Museum is located in Vytegra. Another museum in Vytegra is located in the B440 Foxtrot-class submarine.

== Climate ==
Climate data for Vytegra (extremes 1878-present)
| Month | Jan | Feb | Mar | Apr | May | Jun | Jul | Aug | Sep | Oct | Nov | Dec | Year |
|---|---|---|---|---|---|---|---|---|---|---|---|---|---|
| Record high °C (°F) | 6.9 (44.4) | 6.7 (44.1) | 15.8 (60.4) | 26.6 (79.9) | 33.5 (92.3) | 34.6 (94.3) | 35.7 (96.3) | 35.6 (96.1) | 28.3 (82.9) | 21.5 (70.7) | 12.1 (53.8) | 9.7 (49.5) | 35.7 (96.3) |
| Mean daily maximum °C (°F) | −5.8 (21.6) | −4.9 (23.2) | 0.8 (33.4) | 8.5 (47.3) | 15.8 (60.4) | 20.4 (68.7) | 23.2 (73.8) | 20.6 (69.1) | 14.7 (58.5) | 6.8 (44.2) | 0.0 (32.0) | −3.5 (25.7) | 8.0 (46.5) |
| Daily mean °C (°F) | −8.8 (16.2) | −8.6 (16.5) | −3.7 (25.3) | 3.2 (37.8) | 9.7 (49.5) | 14.7 (58.5) | 17.7 (63.9) | 15.3 (59.5) | 10.3 (50.5) | 4.1 (39.4) | −2.1 (28.2) | −5.9 (21.4) | 3.8 (38.9) |
| Mean daily minimum °C (°F) | −12.2 (10.0) | −12.3 (9.9) | −7.7 (18.1) | −1.3 (29.7) | 4.1 (39.4) | 9.1 (48.4) | 12.4 (54.3) | 10.8 (51.4) | 6.8 (44.2) | 1.8 (35.2) | −4.2 (24.4) | −8.5 (16.7) | −0.1 (31.8) |
| Record low °C (°F) | −49.4 (−56.9) | −49.4 (−56.9) | −44.1 (−47.4) | −26.8 (−16.2) | −14.5 (5.9) | −7.3 (18.9) | 0.4 (32.7) | −2.0 (28.4) | −8.4 (16.9) | −21.4 (−6.5) | −33.9 (−29.0) | −45.9 (−50.6) | −49.4 (−56.9) |
| Average precipitation mm (inches) | 45.2 (1.78) | 35.3 (1.39) | 34.2 (1.35) | 29.6 (1.17) | 48.0 (1.89) | 67.6 (2.66) | 92.0 (3.62) | 87.9 (3.46) | 65.7 (2.59) | 76.1 (3.00) | 64.0 (2.52) | 54.1 (2.13) | 699.7 (27.56) |
| Average precipitation days (≥ 1.0 mm) | 12 | 10 | 9 | 7 | 9 | 10 | 11 | 12 | 11 | 13 | 13 | 13 | 130 |
| Average relative humidity (%) | 85 | 82 | 76 | 69 | 65 | 69 | 74 | 79 | 82 | 85 | 87 | 86 | 78 |
| Mean monthly sunshine hours | 22.0 | 54.1 | 125.0 | 190.8 | 265.7 | 277.5 | 278.8 | 222.5 | 127.1 | 54.2 | 21.7 | 8.0 | 1,647.4 |
Source 1: pogoda.ru.net
Source 2: NOAA
