= Timino, Roksomskoye Rural Settlement, Vashkinsky District, Vologda Oblast =

Timino Тимино
- Village
- Location within Vologda Oblast Location within Russia
- Coordinates: 60°24′N 38°11′E
- Country: Russia
- Region: Vologda Oblast
- District: Vashkinsky District
- Time zone: UTC+3:00

Timino (Russian: Тимино) is a rural locality (a village) in Roksomskoye Rural Settlement, Vashkinsky District, Vologda Oblast, Russia. The population was 29 as of 2002.

== Geography ==
The distance to Lipin Bor is 26.5 km and 0.5 km to Parfenovo. Vasyutino is the nearest rural locality.
