= Gora, Andreyevskoye Rural Settlement, Vashkinsky District, Vologda Oblast =

Gora Гора
- Village
- Location within Vologda Oblast Location within Russia
- Coordinates: 60°35′N 38°20′E
- Country: Russia
- Region: Vologda Oblast
- District: Vashkinsky District
- Time zone: UTC+3:00

Gora (Russian: Гора) is a rural locality (a village) in Andreyevskoye Rural Settlement, Vashkinsky District, Vologda Oblast, Russia. The population was 2 as of 2002.

== Geography ==
The distance to Lipin Bor is 63 km, to Andreyevskaya is 32 km. Afanasyevskaya is the nearest rural locality.
