= Danshin Ruchey =

Danshin Ruchey Даньшин Ручей
- Village
- Location within Vologda Oblast Location within Russia
- Coordinates: 60°26′N 37°18′E
- Country: Russia
- Region: Vologda Oblast
- District: Vashkinsky District
- Time zone: UTC+3:00

Danshin Ruchey (Russian: Даньшин Ручей) is a rural locality (a village) in Pokrovskoye Rural Settlement, Vashkinsky District, Vologda Oblast, Russia. The population was 36 as of 2002.

== Geography ==
Danshin Ruchey is located 71 km northwest of Lipin Bor (the district's administrative centre) by road. Pokrovskoye is the nearest rural locality.
