= Maleyevo, Kisnemskoye Rural Settlement, Vashkinsky District, Vologda Oblast =

Maleyevo Малеево
- Village
- Location within Vologda Oblast Location within Russia
- Coordinates: 60°22′N 37°36′E
- Country: Russia
- Region: Vologda Oblast
- District: Vashkinsky District
- Time zone: UTC+3:00

Maleyevo (Russian: Малеево) is a rural locality (a village) in Kisnemskoye Rural Settlement, Vashkinsky District, Vologda Oblast, Russia. The population was 13 as of 2002.

== Geography ==
The distance to Lipin Bor is 32 km, to Troitskoye is 8 km. Iyevlevo is the nearest rural locality.
