= Semenchevo =

Semenchevo Семенчево
- Village
- Location within Vologda Oblast Location within Russia
- Coordinates: 60°19′N 37°25′E
- Country: Russia
- Region: Vologda Oblast
- District: Vashkinsky District
- Time zone: UTC+3:00

Semenchevo (Russian: Семенчево) is a rural locality (a village) in Kisnemskoye Rural Settlement, Vashkinsky District, Vologda Oblast, Russia. The population was 13 as of 2002.

== Geography ==
Semenchevo is located km 41 northwest of Lipin Bor (the district's administrative centre) by road. Gavrilovo-2 is the nearest rural locality.
