= Potetyuyevo =

Potetyuyevo Потетюево
- Village
- Location within Vologda Oblast Location within Russia
- Coordinates: 60°30′N 37°54′E
- Country: Russia
- Region: Vologda Oblast
- District: Vashkinsky District
- Time zone: UTC+3:00

Potetyuyevo (Russian: Потетюево) is a rural locality (a village) in Andreyevskoye Rural Settlement, Vashkinsky District, Vologda Oblast, Russia. The population was 6 as of 2002.

== Geography ==
Potetyuyevo is located 34 km north of Lipin Bor (the district's administrative centre) by road. Kuznechikha is the nearest rural locality.
