= Ryzhikovo =

Ryzhikovo Рыжиково
- Village
- Location within Vologda Oblast Location within Russia
- Coordinates: 60°20′N 37°41′E
- Country: Russia
- Region: Vologda Oblast
- District: Vashkinsky District
- Time zone: UTC+3:00

Ryzhikovo (Russian: Рыжиково) is a rural locality (a village) in Kisnemskoye Rural Settlement, Vashkinsky District, Vologda Oblast, Russia. The population was 2 as of 2002.

== Geography ==
The distance to Lipin Bor is 26 km, to Troitskoye is 2 km.
