= Moseyevo, Vashkinsky District, Vologda Oblast =

Moseyevo Мосеево
- Village
- Location within Vologda Oblast Location within Russia
- Coordinates: 60°32′N 37°46′E
- Country: Russia
- Region: Vologda Oblast
- District: Vashkinsky District
- Time zone: UTC+3:00

Moseyevo (Russian: Мосеево) is a rural locality (a village) in Andreyevskoye Rural Settlement, Vashkinsky District, Vologda Oblast, Russia. The population was 23 as of 2002.

== Geography ==
Moseyevo is located 46 km northwest of Lipin Bor (the district's administrative centre) by road. Antropovo is the nearest rural locality.
