= Maleyevo =

Maleyevo Малеево
- Village
- Location within Vologda Oblast Location within Russia
- Coordinates: 60°39′N 38°00′E
- Country: Russia
- Region: Vologda Oblast
- District: Vashkinsky District
- Time zone: UTC+3:00

Maleyevo (Russian: Малеево) is a rural locality (a village) in Ivanovskoye Rural Settlement, Vashkinsky District, Vologda Oblast, Russia. The population was 88 as of 2002.

== Geography ==
The distance to Lipin Bor is 56 km, to Ivanovskaya is 1 km. Ivanovskaya is the nearest rural locality.
