= Parfenova =

Parfenova (Russian: Парфенова) is the name of several rural localities in Russia:

- Parfenova (Leninskoye Rural Settlement), Kudymkarsky District, Perm Krai, a village in Kudymkarsky District, Perm Krai
- Parfenova (Verkh-Invenskoye Rural Settlement), Kudymkarsky District, Perm Krai, a village in Kudymkarsky District, Perm Krai
