= Popovka Munskaya =

Popovka Munskaya Поповка Мунская
- Village
- Location within Vologda Oblast Location within Russia
- Coordinates: 60°18′N 38°24′E
- Country: Russia
- Region: Vologda Oblast
- District: Vashkinsky District
- Time zone: UTC+3:00

Popovka Munskaya (Russian: Поповка Мунская) is a rural locality (a village) in Vasilyevskoye Rural Settlement, Vashkinsky District, Vologda Oblast, Russia. The population was 2 as of 2002.

== Geography ==
Popovka Munskaya is located 27 km northeast of Lipin Bor (the district's administrative centre) by road. Gavrino is the nearest rural locality.
