= Zuyevo, Vashkinsky District, Vologda Oblast =

Zuyevo Зуево
- Village
- Location within Vologda Oblast Location within Russia
- Coordinates: 60°39′N 37°57′E
- Country: Russia
- Region: Vologda Oblast
- District: Vashkinsky District
- Time zone: UTC+3:00

Zuyevo (Russian: Зуево) is a rural locality (a village) in Ivanovskoye Rural Settlement, Vashkinsky District, Vologda Oblast, Russia. The population was 11 as of 2002.

== Geography ==
Zuyevo is located 49 km north of Lipin Bor (the district's administrative centre) by road. Alyoshino is the nearest rural locality.
