= Sapogovo =

Sapogovo Сапогово
- Village
- Location within Vologda Oblast Location within Russia
- Coordinates: 60°32′N 38°09′E
- Country: Russia
- Region: Vologda Oblast
- District: Vashkinsky District
- Time zone: UTC+3:00

Sapogovo (Russian: Сапогово) is a rural locality (a village) in Andreyevskoye Rural Settlement, Vashkinsky District, Vologda Oblast, Russia. The population was 1 as of 2002.

== Geography ==
Sapogovo is located 45 km northeast of Lipin Bor (the district's administrative centre) by road. Fedorovskaya is the nearest rural locality.
