= Bereg, Vashkinsky District, Vologda Oblast =

Bereg Берег
- Village
- Location within Vologda Oblast Location within Russia
- Coordinates: 60°17′N 37°17′E
- Country: Russia
- Region: Vologda Oblast
- District: Vashkinsky District
- Time zone: UTC+3:00

Bereg (Russian: Берег) is a rural locality (a village) in Kisnemskoye Rural Settlement, Vashkinsky District, Vologda Oblast, Russia. The population was 12 as of 2002.

== Geography ==
Bereg is located 50 km west of Lipin Bor (the district's administrative centre) by road. Domantovo is the nearest rural locality.
