= Rostani, Vashkinsky District, Vologda Oblast =

Rostani Ростани
- Village
- Location within Vologda Oblast Location within Russia
- Coordinates: 60°26′N 37°40′E
- Country: Russia
- Region: Vologda Oblast
- District: Vashkinsky District
- Time zone: UTC+3:00

Rostani (Russian: Ростани) is a rural locality (a village) in Piksimovskoye Rural Settlement, Vashkinsky District, Vologda Oblast, Russia. The population was 44 as of 2002.

== Geography ==
Rostani is located 38 km northwest of Lipin Bor (the district's administrative centre) by road. Isakovo is the nearest rural locality.
