= Salnikovo, Vologda Oblast =

Salnikovo Сальниково
- Village
- Location within Vologda Oblast Location within Russia
- Coordinates: 60°24′N 38°11′E
- Country: Russia
- Region: Vologda Oblast
- District: Vashkinsky District
- Time zone: UTC+3:00

Salnikovo (Russian: Сальниково) is a rural locality (a village) in Roksomskoye Rural Settlement, Vashkinsky District, Vologda Oblast, Russia. The population was 6 as of 2002.

== Geography ==
Salnikovo is located 32 km northeast of Lipin Bor (the district's administrative centre) by road. Parfenovo is the nearest rural locality.
