= Moskvino, Vashkinsky District, Vologda Oblast =

Moskvino Москвино
- Village
- Location within Vologda Oblast Location within Russia
- Coordinates: 60°20′N 37°39′E
- Country: Russia
- Region: Vologda Oblast
- District: Vashkinsky District
- Time zone: UTC+3:00

Moskvino (Russian: Москвино) is a rural locality (a village) in Kisnemskoye Rural Settlement, Vashkinsky District, Vologda Oblast, Russia. The population was 39 as of 2002.

== Geography ==
Moskvino is located 26 km northwest of Lipin Bor (the district's administrative centre) by road. Istomino is the nearest rural locality.
