= Gora, Vasilyevskoye Rural Settlement, Vashkinsky District, Vologda Oblast =

Gora Гора
- Village
- Location within Vologda Oblast Location within Russia
- Coordinates: 60°17′40″N 38°07′46″E
- Country: Russia
- Region: Vologda Oblast
- District: Vashkinsky District
- Time zone: UTC+3:00

Gora (Russian: Гора) is a rural locality (a village) in Vasilyevskoye Rural Settlement, Vashkinsky District, Vologda Oblast, Russia. The population was 2 as of 2002.

== Geography ==
The distance to Lipin Bor is 11 km, to Vasilyevskaya is 8 km. Levinskaya is the nearest rural locality.
