= Iyevlevo =

Iyevlevo Иевлево
- Village
- Location within Vologda Oblast Location within Russia
- Coordinates: 60°22′N 37°38′E
- Country: Russia
- Region: Vologda Oblast
- District: Vashkinsky District
- Time zone: UTC+3:00

Iyevlevo (Russian: Иевлево) is a rural locality (a village) in Kisnemskoye Rural Settlement, Vashkinsky District, Vologda Oblast, Russia. The population was 2 as of 2002.

== Geography ==
Iyevlevo is located 29 km northeast of Lipin Bor (the district's administrative centre) by road. Petukhovo is the nearest rural locality.
