= Pozdino =

Pozdino Поздино
- Village
- Location within Vologda Oblast Location within Russia
- Coordinates: 60°21′N 37°45′E
- Country: Russia
- Region: Vologda Oblast
- District: Vashkinsky District
- Time zone: UTC+3:00

Pozdino (Russian: Поздино) is a rural locality (a village) in Kisnemskoye Rural Settlement, Vashkinsky District, Vologda Oblast, Russia. The population was 10 as of 2002.

== Geography ==
Pozdino is located 20 km northwest of Lipin Bor (the district's administrative centre) by road. Pozdino is the nearest rural locality.
