= Nasonovo, Vashkinsky District, Vologda Oblast =

Nasonovo Насоново
- Village
- Location within Vologda Oblast Location within Russia
- Coordinates: 60°18′N 37°20′E
- Country: Russia
- Region: Vologda Oblast
- District: Vashkinsky District
- Time zone: UTC+3:00

Nasonovo (Russian: Насоново) is a rural locality (a village) in Kisnemskoye Rural Settlement, Vashkinsky District, Vologda Oblast, Russia. The population was 3 as of 2002.

== Geography ==
Nasonovo is located 47 km northwest of Lipin Bor (the district's administrative centre) by road. Lunevo is the nearest rural locality.
