= Sukhoyezhino =

Sukhoyezhino Сухоежино
- Village
- Location within Vologda Oblast Location within Russia
- Coordinates: 60°25′N 38°11′E
- Country: Russia
- Region: Vologda Oblast
- District: Vashkinsky District
- Time zone: UTC+3:00

Sukhoyezhino (Russian: Сухоежино) is a rural locality (a village) in Roksomskoye Rural Settlement, Vashkinsky District, Vologda Oblast, Russia. The population was 8 as of 2002.

== Geography ==
Sukhoyezhino is located 33 km northeast of Lipin Bor (the district's administrative centre) by road. Semyanovskaya is the nearest rural locality.
