= Nizhneye Khotino =

Nizhneye Khotino Нижнее Хотино
- Village
- Location within Vologda Oblast Location within Russia
- Coordinates: 60°18′N 37°56′E
- Country: Russia
- Region: Vologda Oblast
- District: Vashkinsky District
- Time zone: UTC+3:00

Nizhneye Khotino (Russian: Нижнее Хотино) is a rural locality (a village) in Vasilyevskoye Rural Settlement, Vashkinsky District, Vologda Oblast, Russia. The population was 3 as of 2002.

== Geography ==
Nizhneye Khotino is located 7 km northwest of Lipin Bor (the district's administrative centre) by road. Verkhneye Khotino is the nearest rural locality.
