= Deryagino =

Deryagino Дерягино
- Village
- Location within Vologda Oblast Location within Russia
- Coordinates: 60°19′N 37°24′E
- Country: Russia
- Region: Vologda Oblast
- District: Vashkinsky District
- Time zone: UTC+3:00

Deryagino (Russian: Дерягино) is a rural locality (a village) in Kisnemskoye Rural Settlement, Vashkinsky District, Vologda Oblast, Russia. The population was 8 as of 2002.

== Geography ==
Deryagino is located 42 km northwest of Lipin Bor (the district's administrative centre) by road. Semenchevo is the nearest rural locality.
