= Yekimovo, Vashkinsky District, Vologda Oblast =

Yekimovo Екимово
- Village
- Location within Vologda Oblast Location within Russia
- Coordinates: 60°30′N 37°35′E
- Country: Russia
- Region: Vologda Oblast
- District: Vashkinsky District
- Time zone: UTC+3:00

Yekimovo (Russian: Екимово) is a rural locality (a village) in Piksimovskoye Rural Settlement, Vashkinsky District, Vologda Oblast, Russia. The population was 17 as of 2002. There are 2 streets.

== Geography ==
Yekimovo is located 50 km northwest of Lipin Bor (the district's administrative centre) by road. Popovka is the nearest rural locality.
