= Lukyanovo, Vashkinsky District, Vologda Oblast =

Lukyanovo Лукьяново
- Village
- Location within Vologda Oblast Location within Russia
- Coordinates: 60°16′N 38°00′E
- Country: Russia
- Region: Vologda Oblast
- District: Vashkinsky District
- Time zone: UTC+3:00

Lukyanovo (Russian: Лукьяново) is a rural locality (a village) in Vasilyevskoye Rural Settlement, Vashkinsky District, Vologda Oblast, Russia. The population was 88 as of 2002. There are 2 streets.

== Geography ==
Lukyanovo is located 4 km northeast of Lipin Bor (the district's administrative centre) by road. Zarechny is the nearest rural locality.
