= Rechevo =

Rechevo Речево
- Village
- Location within Vologda Oblast Location within Russia
- Coordinates: 60°31′N 37°16′E
- Country: Russia
- Region: Vologda Oblast
- District: Vashkinsky District
- Time zone: UTC+3:00

Rechevo (Russian: Речево) is a rural locality (a village) in Pokrovskoye Rural Settlement, Vashkinsky District, Vologda Oblast, Russia. The population was 1 as of 2002.

== Geography ==
Rechevo is located 75 km northwest of Lipin Bor (the district's administrative centre) by road. Timoshino is the nearest rural locality.
