= Pereyezd =

Pereyezd Переезд
- Village
- Location within Vologda Oblast Location within Russia
- Coordinates: 60°10′N 38°07′E
- Country: Russia
- Region: Vologda Oblast
- District: Vashkinsky District
- Time zone: UTC+3:00

Pereyezd (Russian: Переезд) is a rural locality (a village) in Lipinoborskoye Rural Settlement, Vashkinsky District, Vologda Oblast, Russia. The population was 2 as of 2002.

== Geography ==
Pereyezd is located 16 km southeast of Lipin Bor (the district's administrative centre) by road. Ukhtoma is the nearest rural locality.
