= Chisti, Vologda Oblast =

Chisti Чисти
- Village
- Location within Vologda Oblast Location within Russia
- Coordinates: 60°12′N 38°15′E
- Country: Russia
- Region: Vologda Oblast
- District: Vashkinsky District
- Time zone: UTC+3:00

Chisti (Russian: Чисти) is a rural locality (a village) in Lipinoborskoye Rural Settlement, Vashkinsky District, Vologda Oblast, Russia. The population was 5 as of 2002.

== Geography ==
Chisti is located 20 km southeast of Lipin Bor (the district's administrative centre) by road. Pavlovo is the nearest rural locality.
