= Popovka, Vashkinsky District, Vologda Oblast =

Popovka Поповка
- Village
- Location within Vologda Oblast Location within Russia
- Coordinates: 60°31′N 37°35′E
- Country: Russia
- Region: Vologda Oblast
- District: Vashkinsky District
- Time zone: UTC+3:00

Popovka (Russian: Поповка) is a rural locality (a village) in Piksimovskoye Rural Settlement, Vashkinsky District, Vologda Oblast, Russia. The population was 30 as of 2002.

== Geography ==
The distance to Lipin Bor is 48 km, to Piksimovo is 8 km. Yekimovo is the nearest rural locality.
