= Naumovo, Vologda Oblast =

Naumovo Наумово
- Village
- Location within Vologda Oblast Location within Russia
- Coordinates: 60°17′N 37°19′E
- Country: Russia
- Region: Vologda Oblast
- District: Vashkinsky District
- Time zone: UTC+3:00

Naumovo (Russian: Наумово) is a rural locality (a village) in Kisnemskoye Rural Settlement, Vashkinsky District, Vologda Oblast, Russia. The population was 8 as of 2002.

== Geography ==
Naumovo is located 48 km west of Lipin Bor (the district's administrative centre) by road. Nasonovo is the nearest rural locality.
