= Anikovo, Vashkinsky District, Vologda Oblast =

Anikovo Аниково
- Village
- Location within Vologda Oblast Location within Russia
- Coordinates: 60°28′N 37°52′E
- Country: Russia
- Region: Vologda Oblast
- District: Vashkinsky District
- Time zone: UTC+3:00

Anikovo (Russian: Аниково) is a rural locality (a village) in Andreyevskoye Rural Settlement, Vashkinsky District, Vologda Oblast, Russia. The population was 2 as of 2002. and 0 as of 2010

== Geography ==
Anikovo is located 32 km north of Lipin Bor (the district's administrative centre) by road. Panino is the nearest rural locality.
