= Parfyonovo, Vashkinsky District, Vologda Oblast =

Parfyonovo Парфёново
- Village
- Location within Vologda Oblast Location within Russia
- Coordinates: 60°24′N 38°11′E
- Country: Russia
- Region: Vologda Oblast
- District: Vashkinsky District
- Time zone: UTC+3:00

Parfyonovo (Russian: Парфёново) is a rural locality (a village) and the administrative center of Roksomskoye Rural Settlement, Vashkinsky District, Vologda Oblast, Russia. The population was 179 as of 2002.

== Geography ==
Parfyonovo is located 31 km northeast of Lipin Bor (the district's administrative centre) by road. Timino is the nearest rural locality.
