= Rogalevo =

Rogalevo Рогалево
- Village
- Location within Vologda Oblast Location within Russia
- Coordinates: 60°20′N 37°40′E
- Country: Russia
- Region: Vologda Oblast
- District: Vashkinsky District
- Time zone: UTC+3:00

Rogalevo (Russian: Рогалево) is a rural locality (a village) in Kisnemskoye Rural Settlement, Vashkinsky District, Vologda Oblast, Russia. The population was 11 as of 2002.

== Geography ==
Rogalevo is located 25 km northwest of Lipin Bor (the district's administrative centre) by road. Istomino is the nearest rural locality.
