= Aleshino, Vashkinsky District, Vologda Oblast =

Aleshino Алёшино
- Village
- Location within Vologda Oblast Location within Russia
- Coordinates: 60°40′N 37°57′E
- Country: Russia
- Region: Vologda Oblast
- District: Vashkinsky District
- Time zone: UTC+3:00

Aleshino (Russian: Алёшино) is a rural locality (a village) in Ivanovskoye Rural Settlement, Vashkinsky District, Vologda Oblast, Russia. The population was 8 as of 2002.

== Geography ==
Aleshino is located 50 km north of Lipin Bor (the district's administrative centre) by road. Averino is the nearest rural locality.
