= Glukharevo =

Glukharevo Глухарево
- Village
- Location within Vologda Oblast Location within Russia
- Coordinates: 60°16′N 38°09′E
- Country: Russia
- Region: Vologda Oblast
- District: Vashkinsky District
- Time zone: UTC+3:00

Glukharevo (Russian: Глухарево) is a rural locality (a village) in Vasilyevskoye Rural Settlement, Vashkinsky District, Vologda Oblast, Russia. The population was 4 as of 2002.

== Geography ==
Glukharevo is located 12 km east of Lipin Bor (the district's administrative centre) by road. Shchukino is the nearest rural locality.
