= Tarasyevo =

Tarasyevo Тарасьево
- Village
- Location within Vologda Oblast Location within Russia
- Coordinates: 60°20′N 37°40′E
- Country: Russia
- Region: Vologda Oblast
- District: Vashkinsky District
- Time zone: UTC+3:00

Tarasyevo (Russian: Тарасьево) is a rural locality (a village) in Kisnemskoye Rural Settlement, Vashkinsky District, Vologda Oblast, Russia. The population was 42 as of 2002. There are five streets.

== Geography ==
Tarasyevo is located 25 km northwest of Lipin Bor (the district's administrative centre) by road. Sidorovo is the nearest rural locality.
