= Dryabloye =

Dryabloye Дряблое
- Village
- Location within Vologda Oblast Location within Russia
- Coordinates: 60°26′N 37°17′E
- Country: Russia
- Region: Vologda Oblast
- District: Vashkinsky District
- Time zone: UTC+3:00

Dryabloye (Russian: Дряблое) is a rural locality (a village) in Pokrovskoye Rural Settlement, Vashkinsky District, Vologda Oblast, Russia. The population was 50 as of 2002.

== Geography ==
Dryabloye is located 71 km northwest of Lipin Bor (the district's administrative centre) by road. Nikolskoye is the nearest rural locality.
