= Savalikha =

Savalikha Савалиха
- Village
- Location within Vologda Oblast Location within Russia
- Coordinates: 60°39′N 37°59′E
- Country: Russia
- Region: Vologda Oblast
- District: Vashkinsky District
- Time zone: UTC+3:00

Savalikha (Russian: Савалиха) is a rural locality (a village) in Ivanovskoye Rural Settlement, Vashkinsky District, Vologda Oblast, Russia. The population was 2 as of 2002.

== Geography ==
Savalikha is located 16 km northwest of Lipin Bor (the district's administrative centre) by road. Myakishevo is the nearest rural locality.
