= Prokino, Vashkinsky District, Vologda Oblast =

Prokino Прокино
- Village
- Location within Vologda Oblast Location within Russia
- Coordinates: 60°27′N 37°38′E
- Country: Russia
- Region: Vologda Oblast
- District: Vashkinsky District
- Time zone: UTC+3:00

Prokino (Russian: Прокино) is a rural locality (a village) in Piksimovskoye Rural Settlement, Vashkinsky District, Vologda Oblast, Russia.

== population ==
The population was 27 as of 2002. There are 2 streets.

== Geography ==
Prokino is located 42 km northwest of Lipin Bor (the district's administrative centre) by road. Piksimovo is the nearest rural locality.
