= Vashki =

Vashki (Russian: Вашки) is the name of several rural localities in Russia:

- Vashki, Novosokolnichesky District, Pskov Oblast, a village in Novosokolnichesky District, Pskov Oblast
- Vashki, Pytalovsky District, Pskov Oblast, a village in Pytalovsky District, Pskov Oblast
- Vashki, Vologda Oblast, a village in Vasilyevsky Selsoviet of Vashkinsky District of Vologda Oblast
