= Troshino =

Troshino Трошино
- Village
- Location within Vologda Oblast Location within Russia
- Coordinates: 60°32′N 37°46′E
- Country: Russia
- Region: Vologda Oblast
- District: Vashkinsky District
- Time zone: UTC+3:00

Troshino (Russian: Трошино) is a rural locality (a village) in Andreyevskoye Rural Settlement, Vashkinsky District, Vologda Oblast, Russia. The population was 1 as of 2002.

== Geography ==
Troshino is located 39 km northwest of Lipin Bor (the district's administrative centre) by road. Matveyeva Gora is the nearest rural locality.
