= Verkhneye Khotino =

Verkhneye Khotino Верхнее Хотино
- Village
- Location within Vologda Oblast Location within Russia
- Coordinates: 60°18′N 37°56′E
- Country: Russia
- Region: Vologda Oblast
- District: Vashkinsky District
- Time zone: UTC+3:00

Verkhneye Khotino (Russian: Верхнее Хотино) is a rural locality (a village) in Vasilyevskoye Rural Settlement, Vashkinsky District, Vologda Oblast, Russia. The population was 20 as of 2002.

== Geography ==
Verkhneye Khotino is located 7 km northwest of Lipin Bor (the district's administrative centre) by road. Nizhneye Khotino is the nearest rural locality.
