= Domantovo =

Domantovo Домантово
- Village
- Location within Vologda Oblast Location within Russia
- Coordinates: 60°17′N 37°17′E
- Country: Russia
- Region: Vologda Oblast
- District: Vashkinsky District
- Time zone: UTC+3:00

Domantovo (Russian: Домантово) is a rural locality (a village) in Kisnemskoye Rural Settlement, Vashkinsky District, Vologda Oblast, Russia. The population was 1 as of 2002.

== Geography ==
Domantovo is located 49 km west of Lipin Bor (the district's administrative centre) by road. Parshino is the nearest rural locality.
