= Timino, Andreyevskoye Rural Settlement, Vashkinsky District, Vologda Oblast =

Timino Тимино
- Village
- Location within Vologda Oblast Location within Russia
- Coordinates: 60°23′N 37°52′E
- Country: Russia
- Region: Vologda Oblast
- District: Vashkinsky District
- Time zone: UTC+3:00

Timino (Russian: Тимино) is a rural locality (a village) in Andreyevskoye Rural Settlement, Vashkinsky District, Vologda Oblast, Russia. The population was 15 as of 2002.

== Geography ==
The distance to Lipin Bor is 19 km, to Andreyevskaya is 4 km. Alyoshkovo is the nearest rural locality.
