= Alferovskaya =

Alferovskaya Алферовская
- Village
- Location within Vologda Oblast Location within Russia
- Coordinates: 60°26′N 38°01′E
- Country: Russia
- Region: Vologda Oblast
- District: Vashkinsky District
- Time zone: UTC+3:00

Alferovskaya (Russian: Алферовская) is a rural locality (a village) in Andreyevskoye Rural Settlement, Vashkinsky District, Vologda Oblast, Russia. The population was 3 as of 2002.

== Geography ==
Alferovskaya is located 36 km north of Lipin Bor (the district's administrative centre) by road. Grishinskaya is the nearest rural locality.
