= Levino, Vashkinsky District, Vologda Oblast =

Levino Левино
- Village
- Location within Vologda Oblast Location within Russia
- Coordinates: 60°29′N 37°31′E
- Country: Russia
- Region: Vologda Oblast
- District: Vashkinsky District
- Time zone: UTC+3:00

Levino (Russian: Левино) is a rural locality (a village) in Porechenskoye Rural Settlement, Vashkinsky District, Vologda Oblast, Russia. The population was 4 as of 2002.

== Geography ==
Levino is located 54 km northwest of Lipin Bor (the district's administrative centre) by road. Bonga is the nearest rural locality.
