= Koptevo, Vologda Oblast =

Koptevo Коптево
- Village
- Location within Vologda Oblast Location within Russia
- Coordinates: 60°19′N 37°43′E
- Country: Russia
- Region: Vologda Oblast
- District: Vashkinsky District
- Time zone: UTC+3:00

Koptevo (Russian: Коптево) is a rural locality (a village) in Kisnemskoye Rural Settlement, Vashkinsky District, Vologda Oblast, Russia. The population was 9 as of 2002.

== Geography ==
Koptevo is located 22 km northwest of Lipin Bor (the district's administrative centre) by road. Volkovo is the nearest rural locality.
