= Novets =

Novets Новец
- Village
- Location within Vologda Oblast Location within Russia
- Coordinates: 60°25′N 37°39′E
- Country: Russia
- Region: Vologda Oblast
- District: Vashkinsky District
- Time zone: UTC+3:00

Novets (Russian: Новец) is a rural locality (a village) in Piksimovksoye Rural Settlement, Vashkinsky District, Vologda Oblast, Russia. The population was 15 as of 2002.

== Geography ==
Novets is located 36 km northwest of Lipin Bor (the district's administrative centre) by road. Ushakovo is the nearest rural locality.
