= Trifanovo, Vologda Oblast =

Trifanovo Трифаново
- Village
- Location within Vologda Oblast Location within Russia
- Coordinates: 60°38′N 38°04′E
- Country: Russia
- Region: Vologda Oblast
- District: Vashkinsky District
- Time zone: UTC+3:00

Trifanovo (Russian: Трифаново) is a rural locality (a village) in Ivanovskoye Rural Settlement, Vashkinsky District, Vologda Oblast, Russia. The population was 18 as of 2002.

== Geography ==
Trifanovo is located 53 km northeast of Lipin Bor (the district's administrative centre) by road. Larino is the nearest rural locality.
