= Pervomaysky, Vashkinsky District, Vologda Oblast =

Pervomaysky Первомайский
- Settlement
- Location within Vologda Oblast Location within Russia
- Coordinates: 60°27′N 37°57′E
- Country: Russia
- Region: Vologda Oblast
- District: Vashkinsky District
- Time zone: UTC+3:00

Pervomaysky (Russian: Первомайский) is a rural locality (a settlement) in Andreyevskoye Rural Settlement, Vashkinsky District, Vologda Oblast, Russia. The population was 483 as of 2002. There are 9 streets.

== Geography ==
Pervomaysky is located 27 km north of Lipin Bor (the district's administrative centre) by road. Davydovo is the nearest rural locality.
