= Nesterevo, Vashkinsky District, Vologda Oblast =

Nesterevo Нестерово
- Village
- Location within Vologda Oblast Location within Russia
- Coordinates: 60°31′N 38°10′E
- Country: Russia
- Region: Vologda Oblast
- District: Vashkinsky District
- Time zone: UTC+3:00

Nesterevo (Russian: Нестерово) is a rural locality (a village) in Andreyevskoye Rural Settlement, Vashkinsky District, Vologda Oblast, Russia. The population was 3 as of 2002.

== Geography ==
Nesterevo is located 44 km northeast of Lipin Bor (the district's administrative centre) by road. Popovka-Pushtorskaya is the nearest rural locality.
