= Bolshoy Dvor, Vashkinsky District, Vologda Oblast =

Bolshoy Dvor Большой Двор
- Village
- Location within Vologda Oblast Location within Russia
- Coordinates: 60°18′N 38°11′E
- Country: Russia
- Region: Vologda Oblast
- District: Vashkinsky District
- Time zone: UTC+3:00

Bolshoy Dvor (Russian: Большой Двор) is a rural locality (a village) in Vasilyevskoye Rural Settlement, Vashkinsky District, Vologda Oblast, Russia. The population was 1 as of 2002.

== Geography ==
Bolshoy Dvor is located 16 km northeast of Lipin Bor (the district's administrative centre) by road. Glukharevo is the nearest rural locality.
