= Chesnokovo, Vologda Oblast =

Chesnokovo Чесноково
- Village
- Location within Vologda Oblast Location within Russia
- Coordinates: 60°24′N 37°54′E
- Country: Russia
- Region: Vologda Oblast
- District: Vashkinsky District
- Time zone: UTC+3:00

Chesnokovo (Russian: Чесноково) is a rural locality (a village) in Andreyevskoye Rural Settlement, Vashkinsky District, Vologda Oblast, Russia. The population was 3 as of 2002.

== Geography ==
Chesnokovo is located 19 km northwest of Lipin Bor (the district's administrative centre) by road. Filimonovo is the nearest rural locality.
