= Tushnaya Gora =

Tushnaya Gora Тушная Гора
- Village
- Location within Vologda Oblast Location within Russia
- Coordinates: 60°21′N 37°36′E
- Country: Russia
- Region: Vologda Oblast
- District: Vashkinsky District
- Time zone: UTC+3:00

Tushnaya Gora (Russian: Тушная Гора) is a rural locality (a village) in Kisnemskoye Rural Settlement, Vashkinsky District, Vologda Oblast, Russia. The population was 8 as of 2002.

== Geography ==
Tushnaya Gora is located 29 km northwest of Lipin Bor (the district's administrative centre) by road. Maleyevo is the nearest rural locality.
