= Levinskaya =

Levinskaya Левинская
- Village
- Location within Vologda Oblast Location within Russia
- Coordinates: 60°17′N 38°08′E
- Country: Russia
- Region: Vologda Oblast
- District: Vashkinsky District
- Time zone: UTC+3:00

Levinskaya (Russian: Левинская) is a rural locality (a village) in Vasilyevskoye Rural Settlement, Vashkinsky District, Vologda Oblast, Russia. The population was 6 as of 2002.

== Geography ==
Levinskaya is located 10 km northeast of Lipin Bor (the district's administrative centre) by road. Gora is the nearest rural locality.
