= Mytchikovo =

Mytchikovo Мытчиково
- Village
- Location within Vologda Oblast Location within Russia
- Coordinates: 60°38′N 38°02′E
- Country: Russia
- Region: Vologda Oblast
- District: Vashkinsky District
- Time zone: UTC+3:00

Mytchikovo (Russian: Мытчиково) is a rural locality (a village) in Ivanovskoye Rural Settlement, Vashkinsky District, Vologda Oblast, Russia. The population was 19 as of 2002.

According to the 2002 census, the population was 19 people.

== Geography ==
Mytchikovo is located 51 km north of Lipin Bor (the district's administrative centre) by road. Ushakovo is the nearest rural locality.
