= Zadnyaya, Vashkinsky District, Vologda Oblast =

Zadnyaya Задняя
- Village
- Location within Vologda Oblast Location within Russia
- Coordinates: 60°20′N 37°51′E
- Country: Russia
- Region: Vologda Oblast
- District: Vashkinsky District
- Time zone: UTC+3:00

Zadnyaya (Russian: Задняя) is a rural locality (a village) in Kisnemskoye Rural Settlement, Vashkinsky District, Vologda Oblast, Russia. The population was 41 as of 2002. There are 2 streets.

== Geography ==
Zadnyaya is located 14 km northwest of Lipin Bor (the district's administrative centre) by road. Srednyaya is the nearest rural locality.
