= Kiuy =

Kiuy Киуй
- Selo
- Location within Vologda Oblast Location within Russia
- Coordinates: 60°20′N 37°46′E
- Country: Russia
- Region: Vologda Oblast
- District: Vashkinsky District
- Time zone: UTC+3:00

Kiuy (Russian: Киуй) is a rural locality (a selo) in Kisnemskoye Rural Settlement, Vashkinsky District, Vologda Oblast, Russia. The population was 17 as of 2002.

== Geography ==
Kiuy is located 19 km northwest of Lipin Bor (the district's administrative centre) by road. Grikshino is the nearest rural locality.
