= Averino =

Averino (Russian: Аверино) is the name of several rural localities in Russia:

- Averino, Belgorod Oblast, a selo in Gubkinsky District of Belgorod Oblast
- Averino, Ivanovo Oblast, a village in Zavolzhsky District of Ivanovo Oblast
- Averino, Kostroma Oblast, a village in Pavinskoye Settlement of Pavinsky District in Kostroma Oblast; 59°7′N 46°5′E
- Averino, Nizhny Novgorod Oblast, a village in Loyminsky Selsoviet of Sokolsky District in Nizhny Novgorod Oblast
- Averino, Vologda Oblast, a village in Ivanovsky Selsoviet of Vashkinsky District in Vologda Oblast
- Averino, Voronezh Oblast, a khutor in Korotoyakskoye Rural Settlement of Ostrogozhsky District in Voronezh Oblast
