= Loginovo, Vashkinsky District, Vologda Oblast =

Loginovo Логиново
- Village
- Location within Vologda Oblast Location within Russia
- Coordinates: 60°18′N 38°06′E
- Country: Russia
- Region: Vologda Oblast
- District: Vashkinsky District
- Time zone: UTC+3:00

Loginovo (Russian: Логиново) is a rural locality (a village) in Vasilyevskoye Rural Settlement, Vashkinsky District, Vologda Oblast, Russia. The population was 4 in 2002.

== Geography ==
The distance to Lipin Bor is 13 kilometres (8.1 mi), to Vasilyevskaya is 10 kilometres (6.2 mi). Vesnino is the nearest rural locality.
