= Malaya Chagotma =

Malaya Chagotma Малая Чаготма
- Village
- Location within Vologda Oblast Location within Russia
- Coordinates: 60°33′N 37°52′E
- Country: Russia
- Region: Vologda Oblast
- District: Vashkinsky District
- Time zone: UTC+3:00

Malaya Chagotma (Russian: Малая Чаготма) is a rural locality (a village) in Andreyevskoye Rural Settlement, Vashkinsky District, Vologda Oblast, Russia. The population was 10 as of 2002.

== Geography ==
Malaya Chagotma is located 38 km north of Lipin Bor (the district's administrative centre) by road. Bolshaya Chagotma is the nearest rural locality.
