= Veliky Dvor, Vashkinsky District, Vologda Oblast =

Veliky Dvor Великий Двор
- Village
- Location within Vologda Oblast Location within Russia
- Coordinates: 60°31′N 37°35′E
- Country: Russia
- Region: Vologda Oblast
- District: Vashkinsky District
- Time zone: UTC+3:00

Veliky Dvor (Russian: Великий Двор) is a rural locality (a village) in Piksimovskoye Rural Settlement, Vashkinsky District, Vologda Oblast, Russia. The population was 26 as of 2002.

== Geography ==
Veliky Dvor is located 50 km northwest of Lipin Bor (the district's administrative centre) by road. Popovka is the nearest rural locality.
