= Vesnino =

Vesnino Веснино
- Village
- Location within Vologda Oblast Location within Russia
- Coordinates: 60°19′N 38°08′E
- Country: Russia
- Region: Vologda Oblast
- District: Vashkinsky District
- Time zone: UTC+3:00

Vesnino (Russian: Веснино) is a rural locality (a village) in Vasilyevskoye Rural Settlement, Vashkinsky District, Vologda Oblast, Russia. The population was 1 as of 2002.

== Geography ==
Vesnino is located 13 km northeast of Lipin Bor (the district's administrative centre) by road. Loginovo is the nearest rural locality.
