= Ostaninskaya =

Ostaninskaya Останинская
- Village
- Location within Vologda Oblast Location within Russia
- Coordinates: 60°17′N 38°18′E
- Country: Russia
- Region: Vologda Oblast
- District: Vashkinsky District
- Time zone: UTC+3:00

Ostaninskaya (Russian: Останинская) is a rural locality (a village) in Vasilyevskoye Rural Settlement, Vashkinsky District, Vologda Oblast, Russia. The population was 2 as of 2002.

== Geography ==
Ostaninskaya is located 21 km east of Lipin Bor (the district's administrative centre) by road. Yakushevo is the nearest rural locality.
