= Anshevskaya =

Anshevskaya Аншевская
- Village
- Location within Vologda Oblast Location within Russia
- Coordinates: 60°27′N 38°01′E
- Country: Russia
- Region: Vologda Oblast
- District: Vashkinsky District
- Time zone: UTC+3:00

Anshevskaya (Russian: Аншевская) is a rural locality (a village) in Andreyevskoye Rural Settlement, Vashkinsky District, Vologda Oblast, Russia. The population was 2 as of 2002.

== Geography ==
Anshevskaya is located 37 km northeast of Lipin Bor (the district's administrative centre) by road. Alferovskaya is the nearest rural locality.
