= Istomino, Vashkinsky District, Vologda Oblast =

Istomino Истомино
- Village
- Location within Vologda Oblast Location within Russia
- Coordinates: 60°20′N 37°40′E
- Country: Russia
- Region: Vologda Oblast
- District: Vashkinsky District
- Time zone: UTC+3:00

Istomino (Russian: Истомино) is a rural locality (a village) in Kisnemskoye Rural Settlement, Vashkinsky District, Vologda Oblast, Russia. The population was 1 as of 2002.

== Geography ==
Istomino is located 16 km northwest of Lipin Bor (the district's administrative centre) by road. Myakishevo is the nearest rural locality.
