= Novokemsky =

Novokemsky Новокемский
- Settlement
- Location within Vologda Oblast Location within Russia
- Coordinates: 60°21′N 37°14′E
- Country: Russia
- Region: Vologda Oblast
- District: Vashkinsky District
- Time zone: UTC+3:00

Novokemsky (Russian: Новокемский) is a rural locality (a settlement) in Konevskoye Rural Settlement, Vashkinsky District, Vologda Oblast, Russia. The population was 1,044 as of 2002. There are 18 streets.

== Geography ==
Novokemsky is located on the bank of the Kema River, 58 km northwest of Lipin Bor (the district's administrative centre) by road. Domantovo is the nearest rural locality.
