= Mys, Vasilyevskoye Rural Settlement, Vashkinsky District, Vologda Oblast =

Mys Мыс
- Village
- Location within Vologda Oblast Location within Russia
- Coordinates: 60°16′N 38°15′E
- Country: Russia
- Region: Vologda Oblast
- District: Vashkinsky District
- Time zone: UTC+3:00

Mys (Russian: Мыс) is a rural locality (a village) in Vasilyevskoye Rural Settlement, Vashkinsky District, Vologda Oblast, Russia. The population was 11 as of 2002.

== Geography ==
The distance to Lipin Bor is 23 km, to Vasilyevskaya is 20 km. Pinshino is the nearest rural locality.
