= Timoshino, Vashkinsky District, Vologda Oblast =

Timoshino Тимошино
- Village
- Location within Vologda Oblast Location within Russia
- Coordinates: 60°31′N 37°17′E
- Country: Russia
- Region: Vologda Oblast
- District: Vashkinsky District
- Time zone: UTC+3:00

Timoshino (Russian: Тимошино) is a rural locality (a village) in Pokrovskoye Rural Settlement, Vashkinsky District, Vologda Oblast, Russia. The population was 7 as of 2002.

== Geography ==
The distance to Lipin Bor is 84.5 km, to Pokrovskoye is 15.5 km. Vasyukovo is the nearest rural locality.
