= Pinshino =

Pinshino Пиньшино
- Village
- Location within Vologda Oblast Location within Russia
- Coordinates: 60°17′N 38°16′E
- Country: Russia
- Region: Vologda Oblast
- District: Vashkinsky District
- Time zone: UTC+3:00

Pinshino (Russian: Пиньшино) is a rural locality (a village) in Vasilyevskoye Rural Settlement, Vashkinsky District, Vologda Oblast, Russia. The population was 93 as of 2002.

== Geography ==
Pinshino is located 19 km east of Lipin Bor (the district's administrative centre) by road. Popovka-Volotskaya is the nearest rural locality.
