= Piksimovo =

Piksimovo Пиксимово
- Village
- Location within Vologda Oblast Location within Russia
- Coordinates: 60°27′N 37°39′E
- Country: Russia
- Region: Vologda Oblast
- District: Vashkinsky District
- Time zone: UTC+3:00

Piksimovo (Russian: Пиксимово) is a rural locality (a village) and the administrative center of Piksimovskoye Rural Settlement, Vashkinsky District, Vologda Oblast, Russia. The population was 152 as of 2002. There are 5 streets.

== Geography ==
Piksimovo is located 41 km northwest of Lipin Bor (the district's administrative centre) by road. Prokino is the nearest rural locality.
