= Popovka-Volotskaya =

Popovka-Volotskaya Поповка-Волоцкая
- Village
- Location within Vologda Oblast Location within Russia
- Coordinates: 60°16′45″N 38°16′10″E
- Country: Russia
- Region: Vologda Oblast
- District: Vashkinsky District
- Time zone: UTC+3:00

Popovka-Volotskaya (Russian: Поповка-Волоцкая) is a rural locality (a village) in Vasilyevskoye Rural Settlement, Vashkinsky District, Vologda Oblast, Russia. The population was 25 as of 2002.

== Geography ==
Popovka-Volotskaya is located 18 km east of Lipin Bor (the district's administrative centre) by road. Pinshino is the nearest rural locality.
