= Bosovo =

Bosovo Босово
- Village
- Location within Vologda Oblast Location within Russia
- Coordinates: 60°31′N 37°46′E
- Country: Russia
- Region: Vologda Oblast
- District: Vashkinsky District
- Time zone: UTC+3:00

Bosovo (Russian: Босово) is a rural locality (a village) in Andreyevskoye Rural Settlement, Vashkinsky District, Vologda Oblast, Russia. The population was 7 as of 2002.

== Geography ==
Bosovo is located 47 km northwest of Lipin Bor (the district's administrative centre) by road. Antropovo is the nearest rural locality.
