= Popovka-Pushtorskaya =

Popovka-Pushtorskaya Поповка-Пушторская
- Village
- Location within Vologda Oblast Location within Russia
- Coordinates: 60°31′N 38°09′E
- Country: Russia
- Region: Vologda Oblast
- District: Vashkinsky District
- Time zone: UTC+3:00

Popovka-Pushtorskaya (Russian: Поповка-Пушторская) is a rural locality (a village) in Andreyevskoye Rural Settlement, Vashkinsky District, Vologda Oblast, Russia. The population was 1 as of 2002.

== Geography ==
Popovka-Pushtorskaya is located 43 km northeast of Lipin Bor (the district's administrative centre) by road. Nesterovo is the nearest rural locality.
