= Ukhtoma =

Ukhtoma Ухтома
- Selo
- Location within Vologda Oblast Location within Russia
- Coordinates: 60°10′N 38°02′E
- Country: Russia
- Region: Vologda Oblast
- District: Vashkinsky District
- Time zone: UTC+3:00

Ukhtoma (Russian: Ухтома) is a rural locality (a selo) in Lipinoborskoye Rural Settlement, Vashkinsky District, Vologda Oblast, Russia. The population was 143 as of 2002. There are 11 streets.

== Geography ==
Ukhtoma is located 11 km southeast of Lipin Bor (the district's administrative centre) by road. Pereyezd is the nearest rural locality.
