= Troitskoye, Vashkinsky District, Vologda Oblast =

Troitskoye Троицкое
- Selo
- Location within Vologda Oblast Location within Russia
- Coordinates: 60°19′N 37°42′E
- Country: Russia
- Region: Vologda Oblast
- District: Vashkinsky District
- Time zone: UTC+3:00

Troitskoye (Russian: Троицкое) is a rural locality (a selo) and the administrative center of Kisnemskoye Rural Settlement, Vashkinsky District, Vologda Oblast, Russia. The population was 263 as of 2002. There are 8 streets.

== Geography ==
Troitskoye is located 23 km northwest of Lipin Bor (the district's administrative centre) by road. Monastyrskaya is the nearest rural locality.
