= Lipin Bor =

Lipin Bor Липин Бор
- Selo
- Interactive map of Lipin Bor
- Location of Lipin Bor Lipin Bor (Vologda Oblast)
- Coordinates: 60°16′N 37°59′E
- Country: Russia
- Federal subject: Vologda Oblast
- Administrative district: Vashkinsky District
- Selsoviet: Lipinoborsky Selsoviet
- Founded: 1938

Population (2010 Census)
  - Total: 3,672
  - Estimate (2021): 3,364 (−8.4%)

Administrative status
  - Capital of: Vashkinsky District, Lipinoborsky Selsoviet

Municipal status
  - Municipal district: Vashkinsky Municipal District
  - Rural settlement: Lipinoborskoye Rural Settlement
  - Capital of: Vashkinsky Municipal District, Lipinoborskoye Rural Settlement
- Time zone: UTC+3 (MSK)
- Postal code: 161250
- OKTMO ID: 19612420101

Lipin Bor (Russian: Ли́пин Бор) is a rural locality (a selo) and the administrative center of Vashkinsky District, Vologda Oblast, Russia, located on the northern shore of Lake Beloye. It also serves as the administrative center of Lipinoborsky Selsoviet, one of the twelve selsoviets into which the district is administratively divided. Municipally, it is the administrative center of Lipinoborskoye Rural Settlement. Population: 3,672 (2010 census); 3,845 (2002 census); 4,083 (1989 Soviet census).

== History ==
Lipin Bor was founded in 1938. The administrative center of Vashkinsky District was immediately transferred to Lipin Bor from the selo of Vashki.

== Economy ==
=== Industry ===
In Lipin Bor, there are food industry and timber industry enterprises.

=== Transportation ===
There is a highway connecting Vologda and Vytegra which passes several kilometers from Lipin Bor. Another road branches off south, running via Lipin Bor to Belozersk. There are also local roads with bus traffic.

Lake Beloye is a part of the Volga–Baltic Waterway (formerly known as the Mariinsk Canal System), connecting the Rybinsk Reservoir in the river basin of the Volga and Lake Onega in the river basin of the Neva.

== Culture and recreation ==
The Trinity Church (1792) in Lipin Bor has been designated as an architectural monument of local significance.

Vashkinsky District Museum is located in Lipin Bor.

The height of a telecommunications mast in Lipin Bor is 350 metres (1,150 ft), which makes it one of the tallest in Russia.
