= Vashkinsky District =

Vashkinsky District Вашкинский район (Russian)
- District
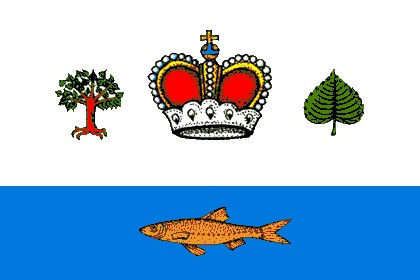
- Flag Coat of arms
- Location of Vashkinsky District in Vologda Oblast
- Coordinates: 60°16′N 37°59′E
- Country: Russia
- Federal subject: Vologda Oblast
- Established: August 1, 1927
- Administrative center: Lipin Bor

Area
  - Total: 2,900 km^{2} (1,100 sq mi)

Population (2010 Census)
  - Total: 8,089
  - Density: 2.8/km^{2} (7.2/sq mi)
  - Urban: 0%
  - Rural: 100%

Administrative structure
  - Administrative divisions: 12 Selsoviets
  - Inhabited localities: 197 rural localities

Municipal structure
  - Municipally incorporated as: Vashkinsky Municipal District
  - Municipal divisions: 0 urban settlements, 3 rural settlements
- Time zone: UTC+3 (MSK)
- OKTMO ID: 19612000
- Website: http://lipinbor.ru

Vashkinsky District (Russian: Ва́шкинский райо́н) is an administrative and municipal district (raion), one of the twenty-six in Vologda Oblast, Russia. It is located in the northwest of the oblast and borders with Vytegorsky District in the north, Kirillovsky District in the east, and with Belozersky District in the south and west. The area of the district is 2,900 square kilometers (1,100 sq mi). Its administrative center is the rural locality (a selo) of Lipin Bor. District's population: 8,089 (2010 census); 10,002 (2002 Census); 11,977 (1989 Soviet census). The population of Lipin Bor accounts for 45.4% of the district's total population.

== Geography ==
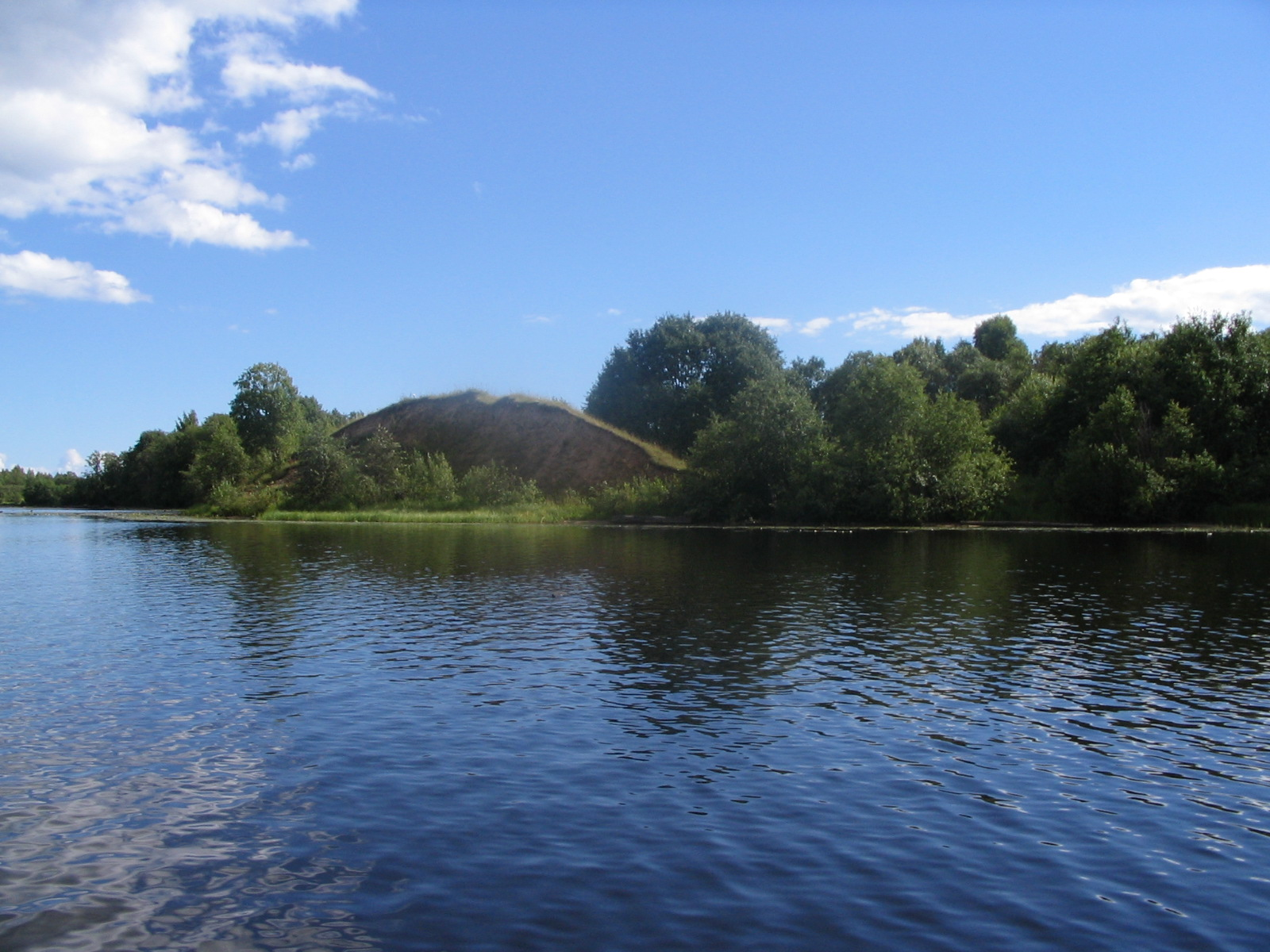
The Kema River

The district is located northeast of Lake Beloye and the area of the lake is divided between Vashkinsky and Belozersky Districts. Much of the area of the district belongs to the basin of Lake Beloye and thus of the Caspian Sea. In particular, the Kovzha River, one of the main tributaries of the lake, forms the western border of the district, and the Kema River, another major tributary, crosses the district from north to south. Most of the area of the district is in the Kema's drainage basin. The eastern and northeastern parts of the district belong to the basin of the Onega River, which flows to the White Sea.

There are many lakes in the district, the biggest of which are Lake Druzhinnoye, Lake Volotskoye, Lake Unzhinskoye, and Lake Pushtorskoye, all belonging to the basin of Lake Beloye.

== History ==
The name "Vashky" originates from Finnic languages where "vaskala" means a type of fish - Common bleak.

According to the Primary Chronicle, Sineus, a brother of Rurik, became the prince of Beloozero in 862. However, it is likely that Sineus never existed. Nevertheless, the archaeological data show that the settlement existed until the 10th century on the northern shore of the lake, close to the selo of Kisnema (now Troitskoye in Vashkinsky District). In the 10th century, it was transferred to the outflow of the Sheksna River. The area was under the influence of the Novgorod Republic and the Novgorodians used the waterway to the White Sea which runs through the current area of the district. In the 13th century, the area was administered by princes of Beloozero, and then in the 14th century, it fell under control of the Grand Duchy of Moscow.

In the course of the administrative reform carried out in 1708 by Peter the Great, the area was included into Ingermanland Governorate (known since 1710 as Saint Petersburg Governorate). In 1727, separate Novgorod Governorate was split off. The area became a part of Belozersky Uyezd of Belozersk Oblast of Novgorod Governorate. In 1776, the area was transferred to Novgorod Viceroyalty. In 1796, the viceroyalty was abolished, and the area was transferred to Novgorod Governorate. In the 19th century, the area was transferred to Kirillovsky Uyezd.

In June 1918, five uyezds of Novgorod Governorate, including Kirillovsky Uyezd, were split off to form Cherepovets Governorate, with the administrative center in Cherepovets. On August 1, 1927, Cherepovets Governorate was abolished and its area became Cherepovets Okrug of Leningrad Oblast. Simultaneously, the uyezds were abolished and Vashkinsky District was established. The administrative center of the district was established in the village of Vashki, hence the name of the district. On September 23, 1937, Vashkinsky District was transferred to newly established Vologda Oblast. In 1938, the administrative center of the district was moved to the selo of Lipin Bor.

On August 1, 1927, Kovzhinsky District (with the administrative center in the selo of Annensky Most) and Sholsky District (with the administrative center in the selo of Zubovo) were also established. In 1937, they were transferred from Leningrad Oblast to Vologda Oblast. In 1959, both districts were abolished. The area of Sholsky District was split between Vashkinsky and Belozersky Districts, and the area of Kovzhinsky District was split between Vashkinsky and Vytegorsky Districts.

== Economy ==
=== Industry ===
The industry of the district is essentially food industry and timber industry.

=== Agriculture ===
There are seven farms in the district, and the number of employees in agriculture in 2010 was 325. The main specializations are cattle breeding (meat and milk production) and crops growing.

=== Transportation ===
A highway connecting Vologda and Vytegra crosses the district bypassing Lipin Bor. Another road branches off south, running via Lipin Bor to Belozersk. There are also local roads with bus traffic.

The Volga–Baltic Waterway (formerly known as the Mariinsk Canal System), connecting the Rybinsk Reservoir in the basin of the Volga River with Lake Onega in the basin of the Neva River, runs through the district, following the course of the Kovzha River. Lake Beloye is also a part of the Volga-Baltic Waterway.

== Culture and recreation ==
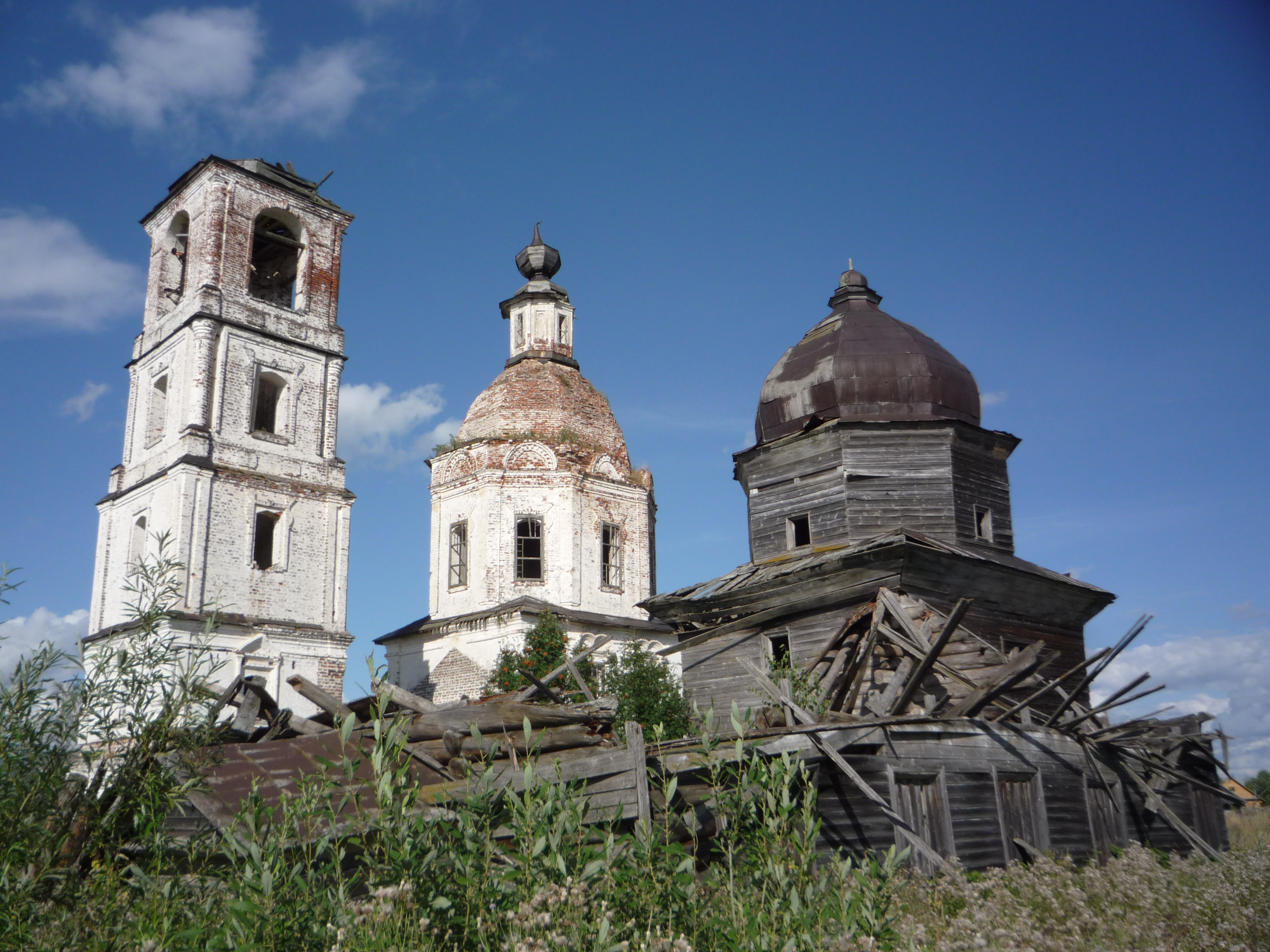
Ukhtoma church complex

The district contains two cultural heritage monuments of federal significance (both are archaeological monuments which are the remains of former settlements) and forty-three objects classified as cultural and historical heritage of local significance. Most of these are wooden farms built prior to 1917.

Vashkinsky District Museum is located in Lipin Bor.
