= Loshchinikha =

Loshchinikha Лощиниха
- Village
- Location within Vologda Oblast Location within Russia
- Coordinates: 59°58′N 40°14′E
- Country: Russia
- Region: Vologda Oblast
- District: Kharovsky District
- Time zone: UTC+3:00

Loshchinikha (Russian: Лощиниха) is a rural locality (a village) in Kharovskoye Rural Settlement, Kharovsky District, Vologda Oblast, Russia. Its population was 13 in 2002.

== Geography ==
Loshchinikha is 9 km northeast of Kharovsk (the district's administrative centre) by road. Ditinskaya is the nearest rural locality.
