= Yakushevo, Kharovsky District, Vologda Oblast =

Yakushevo Якушево
- Village
- Location within Vologda Oblast Location within Russia
- Coordinates: 59°58′N 39°57′E
- Country: Russia
- Region: Vologda Oblast
- District: Kharovsky District
- Time zone: UTC+3:00

Yakushevo (Russian: Якушево) is a rural locality (a village) in Kubenskoye Rural Settlement, Kharovsky District, Vologda Oblast, Russia. The population was 8 as of 2002.

== Geography ==
Yakushevo is located 27 km northwest of Kharovsk (the district's administrative centre) by road. Shenurovo is the nearest rural locality.
