= Yerofeyevskaya =

Yerofeyevskaya Ерофеевская
- Village
- Location within Vologda Oblast Location within Russia
- Coordinates: 60°08′N 39°35′E
- Country: Russia
- Region: Vologda Oblast
- District: Kharovsky District
- Time zone: UTC+3:00

Yerofeyevskaya (Russian: Ерофеевская) is a rural locality (a village) in Kumzerskoye Rural Settlement, Kharovsky District, Vologda Oblast, Russia. The population was 14 as of 2002.

== Geography ==
Yerofeyevskaya is located 51 km northwest of Kharovsk (the district's administrative centre) by road. Danilovskaya is the nearest rural locality.
