= Lisino, Vologda Oblast =

Lisino Лисино
- Village
- Location within Vologda Oblast Location within Russia
- Coordinates: 60°06′N 40°38′E
- Country: Russia
- Region: Vologda Oblast
- District: Kharovsky District
- Time zone: UTC+3:00

Lisino (Russian: Лисино) is a rural locality (a village) in Slobodskoye Rural Settlement, Kharovsky District, Vologda Oblast, Russia. The population was 6 as of 2002.

== Geography ==
Lisino is located 37 km northeast of Kharovsk (the district's administrative centre) by road. Yershikha is the nearest rural locality.
