= Borovikovo, Vologda Oblast =

Borovikovo Боровиково
- Village
- Location within Vologda Oblast Location within Russia
- Coordinates: 59°56′N 40°21′E
- Country: Russia
- Region: Vologda Oblast
- District: Kharovsky District
- Time zone: UTC+3:00

Borovikovo (Russian: Боровиково) is a rural locality (a village) in Kharovskoye Rural Settlement, Kharovsky District, Vologda Oblast, Russia. The population was 8 as of 2002.

== Geography ==
Borovikovo is located 8 km east of Kharovsk (the district's administrative centre) by road. Korovikha is the nearest rural locality.
