= Simanikha =

Simanikha Симаниха
- Village
- Location within Vologda Oblast Location within Russia
- Coordinates: 60°06′N 40°40′E
- Country: Russia
- Region: Vologda Oblast
- District: Kharovsky District
- Time zone: UTC+3:00

Simanikha (Russian: Симаниха) is a rural locality (a village) in Slobodskoye Rural Settlement, Kharovsky District, Vologda Oblast, Russia. The population was 8 as of 2002.

== Geography ==
Simanikha is located 39 km northeast of Kharovsk (the district's administrative centre) by road. Semenovskaya is the nearest rural locality.
