= Chernukhino =

Chernukhino Чернухино
- Village
- Location within Vologda Oblast Location within Russia
- Coordinates: 60°01′N 40°05′E
- Country: Russia
- Region: Vologda Oblast
- District: Kharovsky District
- Time zone: UTC+3:00

Chernukhino (Russian: Чернухино) is a rural locality (a village) in Kubenskoye Rural Settlement, Kharovsky District, Vologda Oblast, Russia. The population was 19 as of 2002.

== Geography ==
Chernukhino is located 12 km northwest of Kharovsk (the district's administrative centre) by road. Filinskoye is the nearest rural locality.
