= Konechnaya, Kharovsky District, Vologda Oblast =

Konechnaya Конечная
- Village
- Location within Vologda Oblast Location within Russia
- Coordinates: 60°05′N 40°28′E
- Country: Russia
- Region: Vologda Oblast
- District: Kharovsky District
- Time zone: UTC+3:00

Konechnaya (Russian: Конечная) is a rural locality (a village) in Slobodskoye Rural Settlement, Kharovsky District, Vologda Oblast, Russia. The population was 10 as of 2002.

== Geography ==
Konechnaya is located 32 km northeast of Kharovsk (the district's administrative centre) by road. Mishutikha is the nearest rural locality.
