= Zuyena =

Zuyena Зуена
- Village
- Location within Vologda Oblast Location within Russia
- Coordinates: 60°07′N 39°46′E
- Country: Russia
- Region: Vologda Oblast
- District: Kharovsky District
- Time zone: UTC+3:00

Zuyena (Russian: Зуена) is a rural locality (a village) in Shapshinskoye Rural Settlement, Kharovsky District, Vologda Oblast, Russia. The population was 14 as of 2002.

== Geography ==
Zuyena is located 40 km northwest of Kharovsk (the district's administrative centre) by road. Mashutikha is the nearest rural locality.
