= Gorka Podselnaya =

Gorka Podselnaya Горка Подсельная
- Village
- Location within Vologda Oblast Location within Russia
- Coordinates: 60°15′N 39°38′E
- Country: Russia
- Region: Vologda Oblast
- District: Kharovsky District
- Time zone: UTC+3:00

Gorka Podselnaya (Russian: Горка Подсельная) is a rural locality (a village) in Azletskoye Rural Settlement, Kharovsky District, Vologda Oblast, Russia. The population was 3 as of 2002.

== Geography ==
Gorka Podselnaya is located 54 km northwest of Kharovsk (the district's administrative centre) by road. Martynikha is the nearest rural locality.
