= Polutikha =

Polutikha Полутиха
- Village
- Location within Vologda Oblast Location within Russia
- Coordinates: 60°12′N 40°37′E
- Country: Russia
- Region: Vologda Oblast
- District: Kharovsky District
- Time zone: UTC+3:00

Polutikha (Russian: Полутиха) is a rural locality (a village) in Slobodskoye Rural Settlement, Kharovsky District, Vologda Oblast, Russia. The population was 4 as of 2002.

== Geography ==
Polutikha is located 44 km northeast of Kharovsk (the district's administrative centre) by road. Makarovskaya is the nearest rural locality.
