= Zolotogorka =

Zolotogorka Золотогорка
- Village
- Location within Vologda Oblast Location within Russia
- Coordinates: 60°01′N 40°37′E
- Country: Russia
- Region: Vologda Oblast
- District: Kharovsky District
- Time zone: UTC+3:00

Zolotogorka (Russian: Золотогорка) is a rural locality (a village) in Ilyinskoye Rural Settlement, Kharovsky District, Vologda Oblast, Russia. The population was 10 as of 2002.

== Geography ==
Zolotogorka is located 28 km northeast of Kharovsk (the district's administrative centre) by road. Ishenino is the nearest rural locality.
