= Pogost Nikolsky =

Pogost Nikolsky Погост Никольский
- Selo
- Location within Vologda Oblast Location within Russia
- Coordinates: 59°52′N 39°59′E
- Country: Russia
- Region: Vologda Oblast
- District: Kharovsky District
- Time zone: UTC+3:00

Pogost Nikolsky (Russian: Погост Никольский) is a rural locality (a selo) in Kharovskoye Rural Settlement, Kharovsky District, Vologda Oblast, Russia. The population was 123 as of 2002. There are 6 streets.

== Geography ==
Pogost Nikolsky is located 17 km southwest of Kharovsk (the district's administrative centre) by road. Dyakovskaya is the nearest rural locality.
