= Lobanikha, Kharovsky District, Vologda Oblast =

Lobanikha Лобаниха
- Village
- Location within Vologda Oblast Location within Russia
- Coordinates: 60°18′N 39°34′E
- Country: Russia
- Region: Vologda Oblast
- District: Kharovsky District
- Time zone: UTC+3:00

Lobanikha (Russian: Лобаниха) is a rural locality (a village) in Azletskoye Rural Settlement, Kharovsky District, Vologda Oblast, Russia. The population was 3 as of 2002.

== Geography ==
Lobanikha is located 61 km northwest of Kharovsk (the district's administrative centre) by road. Timonikha is the nearest rural locality.
