= Gostinskaya =

Gostinskaya Гостинская
- Village
- Location within Vologda Oblast Location within Russia
- Coordinates: 60°13′N 40°07′E
- Country: Russia
- Region: Vologda Oblast
- District: Kharovsky District
- Time zone: UTC+3:00

Gostinskaya (Russian: Гостинская) is a rural locality (a village) in Razinskoye Rural Settlement, Kharovsky District, Vologda Oblast, Russia.The postal code assigned to Gostinskaya is 162261. The population was 10 as of 2002.

== Geography ==
Gostinskaya is located 41 km of from Kharovsk (the district's administrative centre) by road. Larionikha is the nearest rural locality.
