= Sudovo =

Sudovo Судово
- Village
- Location within Vologda Oblast Location within Russia
- Coordinates: 59°52′N 40°17′E
- Country: Russia
- Region: Vologda Oblast
- District: Kharovsky District
- Time zone: UTC+3:00

Sudovo (Russian: Судово) is a rural locality (a village) in Kharovskoye Rural Settlement, Kharovsky District, Vologda Oblast, Russia. The population was 4 as of 2002.

== Geography ==
Sudovo is located 14 km southeast of Kharovsk (the district's administrative centre) by road. Klepestikha is the nearest rural locality.
