= Belenitsyno =

Belenitsyno Беленицыно
- Village
- Location within Vologda Oblast Location within Russia
- Coordinates: 59°56′N 40°18′E
- Country: Russia
- Region: Vologda Oblast
- District: Kharovsky District
- Time zone: UTC+3:00

Belenitsyno (Russian: Беленицыно) is a rural locality (a village) in Kharovskoye Rural Settlement, Kharovsky District, Vologda Oblast, Russia. The population was 11 as of 2002.

== Geography ==
Belenitsyno is located 6 km east of Kharovsk (the district's administrative centre) by road. Sogorki is the nearest rural locality.
