= Ivachino =

Ivachino Ивачино
- Village
- Location within Vologda Oblast Location within Russia
- Coordinates: 60°00′N 39°59′E
- Country: Russia
- Region: Vologda Oblast
- District: Kharovsky District
- Time zone: UTC+3:00

Ivachino (Russian: Ивачино) is a rural locality (a village) in Kubenskoye Rural Settlement, Kharovsky District, Vologda Oblast, Russia. The population was 121 as of 2002.

== Geography ==
Ivachino is located 21 km northwest of Kharovsk (the district's administrative centre) by road. Gora is the nearest rural locality.
