= Bychikha =

Bychikha Бычиха
- Village
- Location within Vologda Oblast Location within Russia
- Coordinates: 59°58′N 39°58′E
- Country: Russia
- Region: Vologda Oblast
- District: Kharovsky District
- Time zone: UTC+3:00

Bychikha (Russian: Бычиха) is a rural locality (a village) in Kharovskoye Rural Settlement, Kharovsky District, Vologda Oblast, Russia. The population was 10 as of 2002.

== Geography ==
Bychikha is located 16 km northwest of Kharovsk (the district's administrative centre) by road. Yekimovskaya is the nearest rural locality.
