= Lavrikha =

Lavrikha Лавриха
- Village
- Location within Vologda Oblast Location within Russia
- Coordinates: 60°08′N 39°33′E
- Country: Russia
- Region: Vologda Oblast
- District: Kharovsky District
- Time zone: UTC+3:00

Lavrikha (Russian: Лавриха) is a rural locality (a village) in Kumzerskoye Rural Settlement, Kharovsky District, Vologda Oblast, Russia. The population was 1 as of 2002.

== Geography ==
Lavrikha is located 52 km northwest of Kharovsk (the district's administrative centre) by road with Durovskaya being the nearest rural locality.
