= Tokarevo, Kharovsky District, Vologda Oblast =

Tokarevo Токарево
- Village
- Location within Vologda Oblast Location within Russia
- Coordinates: 60°06′N 40°11′E
- Country: Russia
- Region: Vologda Oblast
- District: Kharovsky District
- Time zone: UTC+3:00

Tokarevo (Russian: Токарево) is a rural locality (a village) in Razinskoye Rural Settlement, Kharovsky District, Vologda Oblast, Russia. The population was 9 as of 2002.

== Geography ==
Tokarevo is located 36 km north of Kharovsk (the district's administrative centre) by road. Drobinino is the nearest rural locality.
