= Shapsha =

Shapsha Шапша
- Selo
- Location within Vologda Oblast Location within Russia
- Coordinates: 60°09′N 39°52′E
- Country: Russia
- Region: Vologda Oblast
- District: Kharovsky District
- Time zone: UTC+3:00

Shapsha (Russian: Шапша) is a rural locality (a selo) and the administrative center of Shapshinskoye Rural Settlement, Kharovsky District, Vologda Oblast, Russia. The population was 493 as of 2002. There are 12 streets.

== Geography ==
Shapsha is located 33 km northwest of Kharovsk (the district's administrative centre) by road. Pankovskaya is the nearest rural locality.
