= Konantsevo =

Konantsevo Конанцево
- Village
- Location within Vologda Oblast Location within Russia
- Coordinates: 59°57′N 40°13′E
- Country: Russia
- Region: Vologda Oblast
- District: Kharovsky District
- Time zone: UTC+3:00

Konantsevo (Russian: Конанцево) is a rural locality (a village) in Kharovskoye Rural Settlement, Kharovsky District, Vologda Oblast, Russia. The population was 60 as of 2002.

== Geography ==
Konantsevo is located 3 km northeast of Kharovsk (the district's administrative centre) by road. Kharovsk is the nearest rural locality.
