= Kuzminskoye, Kharovsky District, Vologda Oblast =

Kuzminskoye Кузьминское
- Village
- Location within Vologda Oblast Location within Russia
- Coordinates: 59°51′N 39°57′E
- Country: Russia
- Region: Vologda Oblast
- District: Kharovsky District
- Time zone: UTC+3:00

Kuzminskoye (Russian: Кузьминское) is a rural locality (a village) in Kharovskoye Rural Settlement, Kharovsky District, Vologda Oblast, Russia. The population was 27 as of 2002.

== Geography ==
Kuzminskoye is located 21 km southwest of Kharovsk (the district's administrative centre) by road. Teterikha is the nearest rural locality.
