= Chichirikha =

Chichirikha Чичириха
- Village
- Location within Vologda Oblast Location within Russia
- Coordinates: 60°18′N 39°36′E
- Country: Russia
- Region: Vologda Oblast
- District: Kharovsky District
- Time zone: UTC+3:00

Chichirikha (Russian: Чичириха) is a rural locality (a village) in Azletskoye Rural Settlement, Kharovsky District, Vologda Oblast, Russia. The population was 8 as of 2002.

== Geography ==
Chichirikha is located 59 km northwest of Kharovsk (the district's administrative centre) by road. Pichikha is the nearest rural locality.
