= Grechutino =

Grechutino Гречутино
- Village
- Location within Vologda Oblast Location within Russia
- Coordinates: 59°58′N 40°29′E
- Country: Russia
- Region: Vologda Oblast
- District: Kharovsky District
- Time zone: UTC+3:00

Grechutino (Russian: Гречутино) is a rural locality (a village) in Mikhaylovskoye Rural Settlement, Kharovsky District, Vologda Oblast, Russia. The population was 6 as of 2002.

== Geography ==
Grechutino is located 19 km northeast of Kharovsk (the district's administrative centre) by road. Savinskaya is the nearest rural locality.
