= Volonga =

Volonga Волонга
- Settlement
- Location within Vologda Oblast Location within Russia
- Coordinates: 59°43′N 40°10′E
- Country: Russia
- Region: Vologda Oblast
- District: Kharovsky District
- Time zone: UTC+3:00

Volonga (Russian: Волонга) is a rural locality (a settlement) in Semigorodneye Rural Settlement, Kharovsky District, Vologda Oblast, Russia. The population was 61 as of 2002.

== Geography ==
Volonga is located 42 km south of Kharovsk (the district's administrative centre) by road. Vozrozhdeniye is the nearest rural locality.
