= Tyushkovskaya =

Tyushkovskaya Тюшковская
- Village
- Location within Vologda Oblast Location within Russia
- Coordinates: 59°59′N 40°10′E
- Country: Russia
- Region: Vologda Oblast
- District: Kharovsky District
- Time zone: UTC+3:00

Tyushkovskaya (Russian: Тюшковская) is a rural locality (a village) in Kharovskoye Rural Settlement, Kharovsky District, Vologda Oblast, Russia. The population was 32 as of 2002.

== Geography ==
Tyushkovskaya is located 6 km northwest of Kharovsk (the district's administrative centre) by road. Sitinsky is the nearest rural locality.
