= Zasukhino, Kharovsky District, Vologda Oblast =

Zasukhino Засухино
- Village
- Location within Vologda Oblast Location within Russia
- Coordinates: 60°16′N 39°40′E
- Country: Russia
- Region: Vologda Oblast
- District: Kharovsky District
- Time zone: UTC+3:00

Zasukhino (Russian: Засухино) is a rural locality (a village) in Azletskoye Rural Settlement, Kharovsky District, Vologda Oblast, Russia. The population was 8 as of 2002.

== Geography ==
Zasukhino is located 54 km northwest of Kharovsk (the district's administrative centre) by road. Sergeikha is the nearest rural locality.
