= Semenikha, Kharovsky District, Vologda Oblast =

Semenikha Семениха
- Village
- Location within Vologda Oblast Location within Russia
- Coordinates: 59°59′N 40°27′E
- Country: Russia
- Region: Vologda Oblast
- District: Kharovsky District
- Time zone: UTC+3:00

Semenikha (Russian: Семениха) is a rural locality (a village) and the administrative center of Ilyinskoye Rural Settlement, Kharovsky District, Vologda Oblast, Russia. The population was 246 as of 2002.

== Geography ==
Semenikha is located 18 km northeast of Kharovsk (the district's administrative centre) by road. Kuzminskaya is the nearest rural locality.
