= Stegaikha =

Stegaikha Стегаиха
- Village
- Location within Vologda Oblast Location within Russia
- Coordinates: 59°50′N 39°59′E
- Country: Russia
- Region: Vologda Oblast
- District: Kharovsky District
- Time zone: UTC+3:00

Stegaikha (Russian: Стегаиха) is a rural locality (a village) in Kharovskoye Rural Settlement, Kharovsky District, Vologda Oblast, Russia. The population was 7 as of 2002.

== Geography ==
Stegaikha is located 21 km southwest of Kharovsk (the district's administrative centre) by road. Sibla is the nearest rural locality.
