= Spichikha =

Spichikha Спичиха
- Village
- Location within Vologda Oblast Location within Russia
- Coordinates: 59°57′N 40°17′E
- Country: Russia
- Region: Vologda Oblast
- District: Kharovsky District
- Time zone: UTC+3:00

Spichikha (Russian: Спичиха) is a rural locality (a village) in Kharovskoye Rural Settlement, Kharovsky District, Vologda Oblast, Russia. The population was 12 as of 2002.

== Geography ==
Spichikha is located 5 km east of Kharovsk (the district's administrative centre) by road. Klepestikha is the nearest rural locality.
