= Vatalovo =

Vatalovo Ваталово
- Village
- Location within Vologda Oblast Location within Russia
- Coordinates: 60°09′N 40°32′E
- Country: Russia
- Region: Vologda Oblast
- District: Kharovsky District
- Time zone: UTC+3:00

Vatalovo (Russian: Ваталово) is a rural locality (a village) in Slobodskoye Rural Settlement, Kharovsky District, Vologda Oblast, Russia. The population was 11 as of 2002.

== Geography ==
Vatalovo is located 40 km northeast of Kharovsk (the district's administrative centre) by road. Arzubikha is the nearest rural locality.
