= Denisovskaya, Kharovsky District, Vologda Oblast =

Denisovskaya Денисовская
- Village
- Location within Vologda Oblast Location within Russia
- Coordinates: 60°09′N 40°09′E
- Country: Russia
- Region: Vologda Oblast
- District: Kharovsky District
- Time zone: UTC+3:00

Denisovskaya (Russian: Денисовская) is a rural locality (a village) in Razinskoye Rural Settlement, Kharovsky District, Vologda Oblast, Russia. The population was 21 as of 2002.

== Geography ==
Denisovskaya is located 37 km north of Kharovsk (the district's administrative centre) by road. Kuryanovskaya is the nearest rural locality.
