= Sopyatino, Kharovsky District, Vologda Oblast =

Sopyatino Сопятино
- Village
- Location within Vologda Oblast Location within Russia
- Coordinates: 60°07′N 39°46′E
- Country: Russia
- Region: Vologda Oblast
- District: Kharovsky District
- Time zone: UTC+3:00

Sopyatino (Russian: Сопятино) is a rural locality (a village) in Shapshinskoye Rural Settlement, Kharovsky District, Vologda Oblast, Russia. The population was 6 as of 2002.

== Geography ==
Sopyatino is located 39 km northwest of Kharovsk (the district's administrative centre) by road. Mitinskaya is the nearest rural locality.
