= Bilgachevo =

Bilgachevo Бильгачево
- Village
- Location within Vologda Oblast Location within Russia
- Coordinates: 59°59′N 40°10′E
- Country: Russia
- Region: Vologda Oblast
- District: Kharovsky District
- Time zone: UTC+3:00

Bilgachevo (Russian: Бильгачево) is a rural locality (a village) in Kharovskoye Rural Settlement, Kharovsky District, Vologda Oblast, Russia. The population was 48 as of 2002.

== Geography ==
Bilgachevo is located 5 km northwest of Kharovsk (the district's administrative centre) by road. Sitinsky is the nearest rural locality.
