= Pereks =

Pereks Перекс
- Village
- Location within Vologda Oblast Location within Russia
- Coordinates: 60°12′N 40°40′E
- Country: Russia
- Region: Vologda Oblast
- District: Kharovsky District
- Time zone: UTC+3:00

Pereks (Russian: Перекс) is a rural locality (a village) in Slobodskoye Rural Settlement, Kharovsky District, Vologda Oblast, Russia. The population was 17 as of 2010.

== Geography ==
Pereks is located 46 km northeast of Kharovsk (the district's administrative centre) by road. Makarovskaya is the nearest rural locality.
