= Nelyubovskaya =

Nelyubovskaya Нелюбовская
- Village
- Location within Vologda Oblast Location within Russia
- Coordinates: 59°57′N 40°29′E
- Country: Russia
- Region: Vologda Oblast
- District: Kharovsky District
- Time zone: UTC+3:00

Nelyubovskaya (Russian: Нелюбовская) is a rural locality (a village) in Mikhaylovskoye Rural Settlement, Kharovsky District, Vologda Oblast, Russia. The population was 4 as of 2002.

== Geography ==
Nelyubovskaya is located 17 km east of Kharovsk (the district's administrative centre) by road. Mikhaylovskoye is the nearest rural locality.
