= Mezhurki =

Mezhurki Межурки
- Settlement
- Location within Vologda Oblast Location within Russia
- Coordinates: 60°15′N 39°23′E
- Country: Russia
- Region: Vologda Oblast
- District: Kharovsky District
- Time zone: UTC+3:00

Mezhurki (Russian: Межурки) is a rural locality (a settlement) in Azletskoye Rural Settlement, Kharovsky District, Vologda Oblast, Russia. The population was 85 as of 2010. There are five streets.

== Geography ==
Mezhurki is located 74 km northwest of Kharovsk (the district's administrative centre) by road. Ploskovo is the nearest rural locality.
