= Kuleshikha =

Kuleshikha Кулешиха
- Village
- Location within Vologda Oblast Location within Russia
- Coordinates: 60°16′N 39°25′E
- Country: Russia
- Region: Vologda Oblast
- District: Kharovsky District
- Time zone: UTC+3:00

Kuleshikha (Russian: Кулешиха) is a rural locality (a village) in Azletskoye Rural Settlement, Kharovsky District, Vologda Oblast, Russia. The population was 3 as of 2002.

== Geography ==
Kuleshikha is located 70 km northwest of Kharovsk (the district's administrative centre) by road. Mezhdurechye is the nearest rural locality.
