= Kumzero =

Kumzero Кумзеро
- Selo
- Location within Vologda Oblast Location within Russia
- Coordinates: 60°08′N 39°39′E
- Country: Russia
- Region: Vologda Oblast
- District: Kharovsky District
- Time zone: UTC+3:00

Kumzero (Russian: Кумзеро) is a rural locality (a selo) and the administrative center of Kumzerskoye Rural Settlement, Kharovsky District, Vologda Oblast, Russia. The population was 215 as of 2002. Kumzero in the region of Vologda is a town located in Russia - some 312 mi or ( 502 km ) North of Moscow, the country's capital. The local timezone is named "Europe/Moscow" with a UTC offset of 4 hours.

== Geography ==
Kumzero is located 47 km northwest of Kharovsk (the district's administrative centre) by road. Nazarikha is the nearest rural locality.
