= Mitikha =

Mitikha Митиха
- Village
- Location within Vologda Oblast Location within Russia
- Coordinates: 60°04′N 40°30′E
- Country: Russia
- Region: Vologda Oblast
- District: Kharovsky District

Population (2002)
  - Total: 4
- Time zone: UTC+3:00
- Postal Code: 162250

Mitikha (Russian: Митиха) is a rural locality (a village) in Slobodskoye Rural Settlement, Kharovsky District, Vologda Oblast, Russia. The population was 4 as of 2002.

== Geography ==
Mitikha is located 27 km northeast of Kharovsk (the district's administrative centre) by road. Vaulikha is the nearest rural locality.
