= Samsonikha =

Samsonikha Самсониха
- Village
- Location within Vologda Oblast Location within Russia
- Coordinates: 59°56′N 40°18′E
- Country: Russia
- Region: Vologda Oblast
- District: Kharovsky District
- Time zone: UTC+3:00

Samsonikha (Russian: Самсониха) is a rural locality (a village) in Kharovskoye Rural Settlement, Kharovsky District, Vologda Oblast, Russia. The population was 1 as of 2002.

== Geography ==
Samsonikha is located 6 km east of Kharovsk (the district's administrative centre) by road. Belenitsyno is the nearest rural locality.
