= Zalesnaya, Vologda Oblast =

Zalesnaya Залесная
- Village
- Location within Vologda Oblast Location within Russia
- Coordinates: 60°14′N 39°46′E
- Country: Russia
- Region: Vologda Oblast
- District: Kharovsky District
- Time zone: UTC+3:00

Zalesnaya (Russian: Залесная) is a rural locality (a village) in Azletskoye Rural Settlement, Kharovsky District, Vologda Oblast, Russia. The population was 7 as of 2002.

== Geography ==
Zalesnaya is located 48 km northwest of Kharovsk (the district's administrative centre) by road. Gorka Kizimskaya is the nearest rural locality.
