= Ustrechnaya =

Ustrechnaya Устречная
- Village
- Location within Vologda Oblast Location within Russia
- Coordinates: 60°10′N 39°41′E
- Country: Russia
- Region: Vologda Oblast
- District: Kharovsky District
- Time zone: UTC+3:00

Ustrechnaya (Russian: Устречная) is a rural locality (a village) in Kumzerskoye Rural Settlement, Kharovsky District, Vologda Oblast, Russia. The population was 3 as of 2002.

== Geography ==
Ustrechnaya is located 53 km northwest of Kharovsk (the district's administrative centre) by road. Sirenskaya is the nearest rural locality.
