= Pashinskaya =

Pashinskaya Пашинская
- Village
- Location within Vologda Oblast Location within Russia
- Coordinates: 60°10′N 39°32′E
- Country: Russia
- Region: Vologda Oblast
- District: Kharovsky District
- Time zone: UTC+3:00

Pashinskaya (Russian: Пашинская) is a rural locality (a village) in Kumzerskoye Rural Settlement, Kharovsky District, Vologda Oblast, Russia. The population was 19 as of 2002.

== Geography ==
Pashinskaya is located 17 km east of Kharovsk (the district's administrative centre) by road. Sofonikha is the nearest rural locality.
