= Kiyevskaya, Vologda Oblast =

Kiyevskaya Киевская
- Village
- Location within Vologda Oblast Location within Russia
- Coordinates: 60°08′N 39°36′E
- Country: Russia
- Region: Vologda Oblast
- District: Kharovsky District
- Time zone: UTC+3:00

Kiyevskaya (Russian: Киевская) is a rural locality (a village) in Kumzerskoye Rural Settlement, Kharovsky District, Vologda Oblast, Russia. The population was 2 as of 2002.

== Geography ==
Kiyevskaya is located 50 km northwest of Kharovsk (the district's administrative centre) by road. Maksimovskaya is the nearest rural locality.
