= Nikulinskoye, Kharovsky District, Vologda Oblast =

Nikulinskoye Никулинское
- Selo
- Location within Vologda Oblast Location within Russia
- Coordinates: 60°14′N 40°05′E
- Country: Russia
- Region: Vologda Oblast
- District: Kharovsky District
- Time zone: UTC+3:00

Nikulinskoye (Russian: Никулинское) is a rural locality (a selo) in Razinskoye Rural Settlement, Kharovsky District, Vologda Oblast, Russia. The population was 31 as of 2002.

== Geography ==
Nikulinskoye is located 44 km north of Kharovsk (the district's administrative centre) by road. Krasnaya Gorka is the nearest rural locality.
