= Loginovskaya, Kharovsky District, Vologda Oblast =

Loginovskaya Логиновская
- Village
- Location within Vologda Oblast Location within Russia
- Coordinates: 60°16′N 40°10′E
- Country: Russia
- Region: Vologda Oblast
- District: Kharovsky District
- Time zone: UTC+3:00

Loginovskaya (Russian: Логиновская) is a rural locality (a village) in Razinskoye Rural Settlement, Kharovsky District, Vologda Oblast, Russia. The population was 7 as of 2002.

== Geography ==
Loginovskaya is located 46 km north of Kharovsk (the district's administrative centre) by road. Luchinskaya is the nearest rural locality.
