= Kryukovo, Kharovsky District, Vologda Oblast =

Kryukovo Крюково
- Village
- Location within Vologda Oblast Location within Russia
- Coordinates: 60°14′N 40°06′E
- Country: Russia
- Region: Vologda Oblast
- District: Kharovsky District
- Time zone: UTC+3:00

Kryukovo (Russian: Крюково) is a rural locality (a village) in Razinskoye Rural Settlement, Kharovsky District, Vologda Oblast, Russia. The population was 122 as of 2002.

== Geography ==
Kryukovo is located 43 km north of Kharovsk (the district's administrative centre) by road. Dorogushikha is the nearest rural locality.
