= Dolgishchevo =

Dolgishchevo Долгищево
- Village
- Location within Vologda Oblast Location within Russia
- Coordinates: 60°05′N 40°00′E
- Country: Russia
- Region: Vologda Oblast
- District: Kharovsky District
- Time zone: UTC+3:00

Dolgishchevo (Russian: Долгищево) is a rural locality (a village) in Kubenskoye Rural Settlement, Kharovsky District, Vologda Oblast, Russia. The population was 1 as of 2002.

== Geography ==
Dolgishchevo is located 23 km northwest of Kharovsk (the district's administrative centre) by road. Bolshaya is the nearest rural locality.
