= Tsarikha =

Tsarikha Цариха
- Village
- Location within Vologda Oblast Location within Russia
- Coordinates: 60°10′N 39°40′E
- Country: Russia
- Region: Vologda Oblast
- District: Kharovsky District
- Time zone: UTC+3:00

Tsarikha (Russian: Цариха) is a rural locality (a village) in Kumzerskoye Rural Settlement, Kharovsky District, Vologda Oblast, Russia.

== Population ==
The population was 8 as of 2002.

== Geography ==
Tsarikha is located 52 km northwest of Kharovsk (the district's administrative centre) by road. Ustrechnaya is the nearest rural locality.
