= Sorozhino =

Sorozhino Сорожино
- Village
- Location within Vologda Oblast Location within Russia
- Coordinates: 60°03′N 40°03′E
- Country: Russia
- Region: Vologda Oblast
- District: Kharovsky District
- Time zone: UTC+3:00

Sorozhino (Russian: Сорожино) is a rural locality (a village) and the administrative center of Kubenskoye Rural Settlement, Kharovsky District, Vologda Oblast, Russia. The population was 221 as of 2010.

== Geography ==
Sorozhino is located 16 km northwest of Kharovsk (the district's administrative centre) by road. Konevo is the nearest rural locality.
