= Arzubikha =

Arzubikha Арзубиха
- Village
- Location within Vologda Oblast Location within Russia
- Coordinates: 60°09′N 40°34′E
- Country: Russia
- Region: Vologda Oblast
- District: Kharovsky District
- Time zone: UTC+3:00

Arzubikha (Russian: Арзубиха) is a rural locality (a village) and the administrative center of Slobodskoye Rural Settlement, Kharovsky District, Vologda Oblast, Russia. The population was 325 as of 2002.

== Geography ==
Arzubikha is located 38 km (24 mi) northeast of Kharovsk (the district's administrative centre) by road. Vatalovo is the nearest rural locality.
