= Cheremukhovo =

Cheremukhovo Черемухово
- Village
- Location within Vologda Oblast Location within Russia
- Coordinates: 59°56′N 40°24′E
- Country: Russia
- Region: Vologda Oblast
- District: Kharovsky District
- Time zone: UTC+3:00

Cheremukhovo (Russian: Черемухово) is a rural locality (a village) in Mikhaylovskoye Rural Settlement, Kharovsky District, Vologda Oblast, Russia. The population was 3 as of 2010.

== Geography ==
Cheremukhovo is located 12 km east of Kharovsk (the district's administrative centre) by road. Popchikha is the nearest rural locality.
