= Pashuchikha =

Pashuchikha Пашучиха
- Village
- Location within Vologda Oblast Location within Russia
- Coordinates: 60°00′N 40°09′E
- Country: Russia
- Region: Vologda Oblast
- District: Kharovsky District
- Time zone: UTC+3:00

Pashuchikha (Russian: Пашучиха) is a rural locality (a village) in Kharovskoye Rural Settlement, Kharovsky District, Vologda Oblast, Russia. The population was 4 as of 2002.

== Geography ==
Pashuchikha is located 8 km northwest of Kharovsk (the district's administrative centre) by road. Sitinsky is the nearest rural locality.
