= Kharitonikha =

Kharitonikha Харитониха
- Village
- Location within Vologda Oblast Location within Russia
- Coordinates: 60°05′N 39°49′E
- Country: Russia
- Region: Vologda Oblast
- District: Kharovsky District
- Time zone: UTC+3:00

Kharitonikha (Russian: Харитониха) is a rural locality (a village) in Shapshinskoye Rural Settlement, Kharovsky District, Vologda Oblast, Russia. The population was 8 as of 2002.

== Geography ==
Kharitonikha is located 45 km northwest of Kharovsk (the district's administrative centre) by road. Malaya Serednyaya is the nearest rural locality.
