= Muryginskaya =

Muryginskaya Мурыгинская
- Village
- Location within Vologda Oblast Location within Russia
- Coordinates: 59°58′N 40°30′E
- Country: Russia
- Region: Vologda Oblast
- District: Kharovsky District
- Time zone: UTC+3:00

Muryginskaya (Russian: Мурыгинская) is a rural locality (a village) in Mikhaylovskoye Rural Settlement, Kharovsky District, Vologda Oblast, Russia. The population was 3 as of 2002.

== Geography ==
Muryginskaya is located 18 km east of Kharovsk (the district's administrative centre) by road. Budrikha is the nearest rural locality.
