= Dolgoborodovo =

Dolgoborodovo Долгобородово
- Village
- Location within Vologda Oblast Location within Russia
- Coordinates: 59°57′N 39°56′E
- Country: Russia
- Region: Vologda Oblast
- District: Kharovsky District
- Time zone: UTC+3:00

Dolgoborodovo (Russian: Долгобородово) is a rural locality (a village) in Kubenskoye Rural Settlement, Kharovsky District, Vologda Oblast, Russia. The population was 7 as of 2002.

== Geography ==
Dolgoborodovo is located 29 km northwest of Kharovsk (the district's administrative centre) by road. Zarubino is the nearest rural locality.
