= Sogorki =

Sogorki (Russian: Согорки) is the name of several rural localities in Kharovsky District of Vologda Oblast, Russia:

- Sogorki, Kharovsky Selsoviet, Kharovsky District, Vologda Oblast, a selo in Kharovsky Selsoviet
- Sogorki, Semigorodny Selsoviet, Kharovsky District, Vologda Oblast, a settlement in Semigorodny Selsoviet
