= Ilyinskaya Popovka =

Ilyinskaya Popovka Ильинская Поповка
- Village

- Location within Vologda Oblast Location within Russia
- Coordinates: 59°59′N 40°26′E
- Country: Russia
- Region: Vologda Oblast
- District: Kharovsky District
- Time zone: UTC+3:00

Ilyinskaya Popovka (Russian: Ильинская Поповка) is a rural locality (a village) in Ilyinskoye Rural Settlement, Kharovsky District, Vologda Oblast, Russia. The population was 4 as of 2002.

== Geography ==
Ilyinskaya Popovka is located 17 km northeast of Kharovsk (the district's administrative centre) by road. Semenikha is the nearest rural locality.
