= Korovikha =

Korovikha Коровиха
- Village
- Location within Vologda Oblast Location within Russia
- Coordinates: 59°56′N 40°22′E
- Country: Russia
- Region: Vologda Oblast
- District: Kharovsky District
- Time zone: UTC+3:00

Korovikha (Russian: Коровиха) is a rural locality (a village) in Kharovskoye Rural Settlement, Kharovsky District, Vologda Oblast, Russia. The population was 4 as of 2002.

== Geography ==
Korovikha is located km southwest of Kharovsk (the district's administrative centre) by road. Borovikovo is the nearest rural locality.
