= Ugolskaya =

Ugolskaya Угольская
- Village
- Location within Vologda Oblast Location within Russia
- Coordinates: 60°15′N 40°05′E
- Country: Russia
- Region: Vologda Oblast
- District: Kharovsky District
- Time zone: UTC+3:00

Ugolskaya (Russian: Угольская) is a rural locality (a village) in Razinskoye Rural Settlement, Kharovsky District, Vologda Oblast, Russia. The population was 11 as of 2002.

== Geography ==
Ugolskaya is located 46 km north of Kharovsk (the district's administrative centre) by road. Belyavskaya is the nearest rural locality.
