= Budrikha =

Budrikha Будриха
- Village
- Location within Vologda Oblast Location within Russia
- Coordinates: 59°58′N 40°29′E
- Country: Russia
- Region: Vologda Oblast
- District: Kharovsky District
- Time zone: UTC+3:00

Budrikha (Russian: Будриха) is a rural locality (a village) in Mikhaylovskoye Rural Settlement, Kharovsky District, Vologda Oblast, Russia. The population was 45 as of 2002.

== Geography ==
Budrikha is located 18 km east of Kharovsk (the district's administrative centre) by road. Muryginskaya is the nearest rural locality.
