= Aseikha =

Aseikha Асеиха
- Village
- Location within Vologda Oblast Location within Russia
- Coordinates: 60°04′N 39°59′E
- Country: Russia
- Region: Vologda Oblast
- District: Kharovsky District
- Time zone: UTC+3:00

Aseikha (Russian: Асеиха) is a rural locality (a village) in Kubenskoye Rural Settlement, Kharovsky District, Vologda Oblast, Russia. The population was 7 as of 2002.

== Geography ==
Aseikha is located 25 km (16 mi) northwest of Kharovsk (the district's administrative centre) by road. Bolshaya is the nearest rural locality.
