= Zakharikha =

Zakharikha Захариха
- Village
- Location within Vologda Oblast Location within Russia
- Coordinates: 60°08′N 40°31′E
- Country: Russia
- Region: Vologda Oblast
- District: Kharovsky District
- Time zone: UTC+3:00

Zakharikha (Russian: Захариха) is a rural locality (a village) in Slobodskoye Rural Settlement, Kharovsky District, Vologda Oblast, Russia. The population was 18 as of 2002.

== Geography ==
Zakharikha is located 41 km northeast of Kharovsk (the district's administrative centre) by road. Arzubikha is the nearest rural locality.
