= Sysoikha =

Sysoikha Сысоиха
- Village
- Location within Vologda Oblast Location within Russia
- Coordinates: 59°52′N 39°59′E
- Country: Russia
- Region: Vologda Oblast
- District: Kharovsky District
- Time zone: UTC+3:00

Sysoikha (Russian: Сысоиха) is a rural locality (a village) in Kharovskoye Rural Settlement, Kharovsky District, Vologda Oblast, Russia. The population was 5 as of 2002.

== Geography ==
Sysoikha is located 17 km southwest of Kharovsk (the district's administrative centre) by road. Zakharovskoye is the nearest rural locality.
