= Pekhtikha =

Pekhtikha Пехтиха
- Village
- Location within Vologda Oblast Location within Russia
- Coordinates: 59°58′N 40°16′E
- Country: Russia
- Region: Vologda Oblast
- District: Kharovsky District
- Time zone: UTC+3:00

Pekhtikha (Russian: Пехтиха) is a rural locality (a village) in Kharovskoye Rural Settlement, Kharovsky District, Vologda Oblast, Russia. The population was 5 as of 2002.

== Geography ==
Pekhtikha is located 10 km northeast of Kharovsk (the district's administrative centre) by road. Churilovo is the nearest rural locality.
