= Dorogushikha =

Dorogushikha Дорогушиха
- Village
- Location within Vologda Oblast Location within Russia
- Coordinates: 60°14′N 40°06′E
- Country: Russia
- Region: Vologda Oblast
- District: Kharovsky District
- Time zone: UTC+3:00

Dorogushikha (Russian: Дорогушиха) is a rural locality (a village) in Razinskoye Rural Settlement, Kharovsky District, Vologda Oblast, Russia. The population was 39 as of 2002.

== Geography ==
Dorogushikha is located 44 km north of Kharovsk (the district's administrative centre) by road. Kryukovo is the nearest rural locality.
