= Shemyakino =

Shemyakino Шемякино
- Village
- Location within Vologda Oblast Location within Russia
- Coordinates: 60°06′N 39°47′E
- Country: Russia
- Region: Vologda Oblast
- District: Kharovsky District
- Time zone: UTC+3:00

Shemyakino (Russian: Шемякино) is a rural locality (a village) in Shapshinskoye Rural Settlement, Kharovsky District, Vologda Oblast, Russia. The population was 7 as of 2002.

== Geography ==
Shemyakino is located 40 km northwest of Kharovsk (the district's administrative centre) by road. Potapikha is the nearest rural locality.
