= Leshyovo =

Leshyovo Лещёво
- Selo
- Location within Vologda Oblast Location within Russia
- Coordinates: 59°58′N 40°13′E
- Country: Russia
- Region: Vologda Oblast
- District: Kharovsky District
- Time zone: UTC+3:00

Leshyovo (Russian: Лещёво) is a rural locality (a selo) in Kharovskoye Rural Settlement, Kharovsky District, Vologda Oblast, Russia. The population was 13 as of 2002.

== Geography ==
Leshyovo is located 7 km northeast of Kharovsk (the district's administrative centre) by road. Palkovskaya is the nearest rural locality.
