= Gorokhovka, Vologda Oblast =

Gorokhovka Гороховка
- Village
- Location within Vologda Oblast Location within Russia
- Coordinates: 60°08′N 40°09′E
- Country: Russia
- Region: Vologda Oblast
- District: Kharovsky District
- Time zone: UTC+3:00

Gorokhovka (Russian: Гороховка) is a rural locality (a village) in Razinskoye Rural Settlement, Kharovsky District, Vologda Oblast, Russia. The population was 6 as of 2002.

== Geography ==
Gorokhovka is located 31 km north of Kharovsk (the district's administrative centre) by road. Yesipovskaya is the nearest rural locality.
