= Gorka Kizimskaya =

Gorka Kizimskaya Горка Кизимская
- Village
- Location within Vologda Oblast Location within Russia
- Coordinates: 60°14′N 39°45′E
- Country: Russia
- Region: Vologda Oblast
- District: Kharovsky District
- Time zone: UTC+3:00

Gorka Kizimskaya (Russian: Горка Кизимская) is a rural locality (a village) in Azletskoye Rural Settlement, Kharovsky District, Vologda Oblast, Russia. The population was 10 as of 2002.

== Geography ==
Gorka Kizimskaya is located 47 km northwest of Kharovsk (the district's administrative centre) by road. Pikhtinskaya is the nearest rural locality.
