= 17 km =

17 km 17 км
- Settlement
- Location within Vologda Oblast
- Coordinates: 59.8025°N 40.464722°E
- Country: Russia
- Region: Vologda Oblast
- District: Kharovsky District
- Time zone: UTC+06:00

17 km (Russian: 17 км) is a rural locality (a settlement) in Semigorodneye Rural Settlement of Kharovsky District, Russia. The population was 37 as of 2002.

== Geography ==
17 km is located 107 km (66 mi) southeast of Kharovsk (the district's administrative centre) by road. Tomashka is the nearest rural locality.

== Streets ==
There are no streets with titles.
