= Kharenskoye =

Kharenskoye Харенское
- Village
- Location within Vologda Oblast Location within Russia
- Coordinates: 59°54′N 39°56′E
- Country: Russia
- Region: Vologda Oblast
- District: Kharovsky District
- Time zone: UTC+3:00

Kharenskoye (Russian: Харенское) is a rural locality (a village) in Kharovskoye Rural Settlement, Kharovsky District, Vologda Oblast, Russia. The population was 3 as of 2002.

== Geography ==
Kharenskoye is located 21 km southwest of Kharovsk (the district's administrative centre) by road. Mishkovskoye is the nearest rural locality.
