= Popchikha, Kharovsky District, Vologda Oblast =

Popchikha Попчиха
- Village
- Location within Vologda Oblast Location within Russia
- Coordinates: 59°56′N 40°23′E
- Country: Russia
- Region: Vologda Oblast
- District: Kharovsky District
- Time zone: UTC+3:00

Popchikha (Russian: Попчиха) is a rural locality (a village) in Mikhaylovskoye Rural Settlement, Kharovsky District, Vologda Oblast, Russia. The population was 9 as of 2002.

== Geography ==
Popchikha is located 11 km east of Kharovsk (the district's administrative centre) by road. Cheremukhovo is the nearest rural locality.
