= Punduga =

Punduga Пундуга
- Settlement
- Location within Vologda Oblast Location within Russia
- Coordinates: 60°07′N 40°12′E
- Country: Russia
- Region: Vologda Oblast
- District: Kharovsky District
- Time zone: UTC+3:00

Punduga (Russian: Пундуга) is a rural locality (a settlement) in Razinskoye Rural Settlement, Kharovsky District, Vologda Oblast, Russia. The population was 289 as of 2002.

== Geography ==
Punduga is located 34 km north of Kharovsk (the district's administrative centre) by road. Grudinskaya is the nearest rural locality.
