= Zarodikha =

Zarodikha Зародиха
- Village
- Location within Vologda Oblast Location within Russia
- Coordinates: 60°15′N 39°42′E
- Country: Russia
- Region: Vologda Oblast
- District: Kharovsky District
- Time zone: UTC+3:00

Zarodikha (Russian: Зародиха) is a rural locality (a village) in Azletskoye Rural Settlement, Kharovsky District, Vologda Oblast, Russia. The population was 6 as of 2002.

== Geography ==
Zarodikha is located 49 km northwest of Kharovsk (the district's administrative centre) by road. Krasimikha is the nearest rural locality.
