= Bolshaya Serednyaya =

Bolshaya Serednyaya Большая Середняя
- Village
- Location within Vologda Oblast Location within Russia
- Coordinates: 60°11′N 39°49′E
- Country: Russia
- Region: Vologda Oblast
- District: Kharovsky District

Population (2002)
  - Total: 2
- Time zone: UTC+3:00

Bolshaya Serednyaya (Russian: Большая Середняя) is a rural locality (a village) in Shapshinskoye Rural Settlement, Kharovsky District, Vologda Oblast, Russia. The population was 2 as of 2002.

== Geography ==
Bolshaya Serednyaya is located 39 km (24 mi) northwest of Kharovsk (the district's administrative centre) by road. Borisovskaya is the nearest rural locality.
