= Nizhne-Kubensky =

Nizhne-Kubensky Нижне-Кубенский
- Settlement
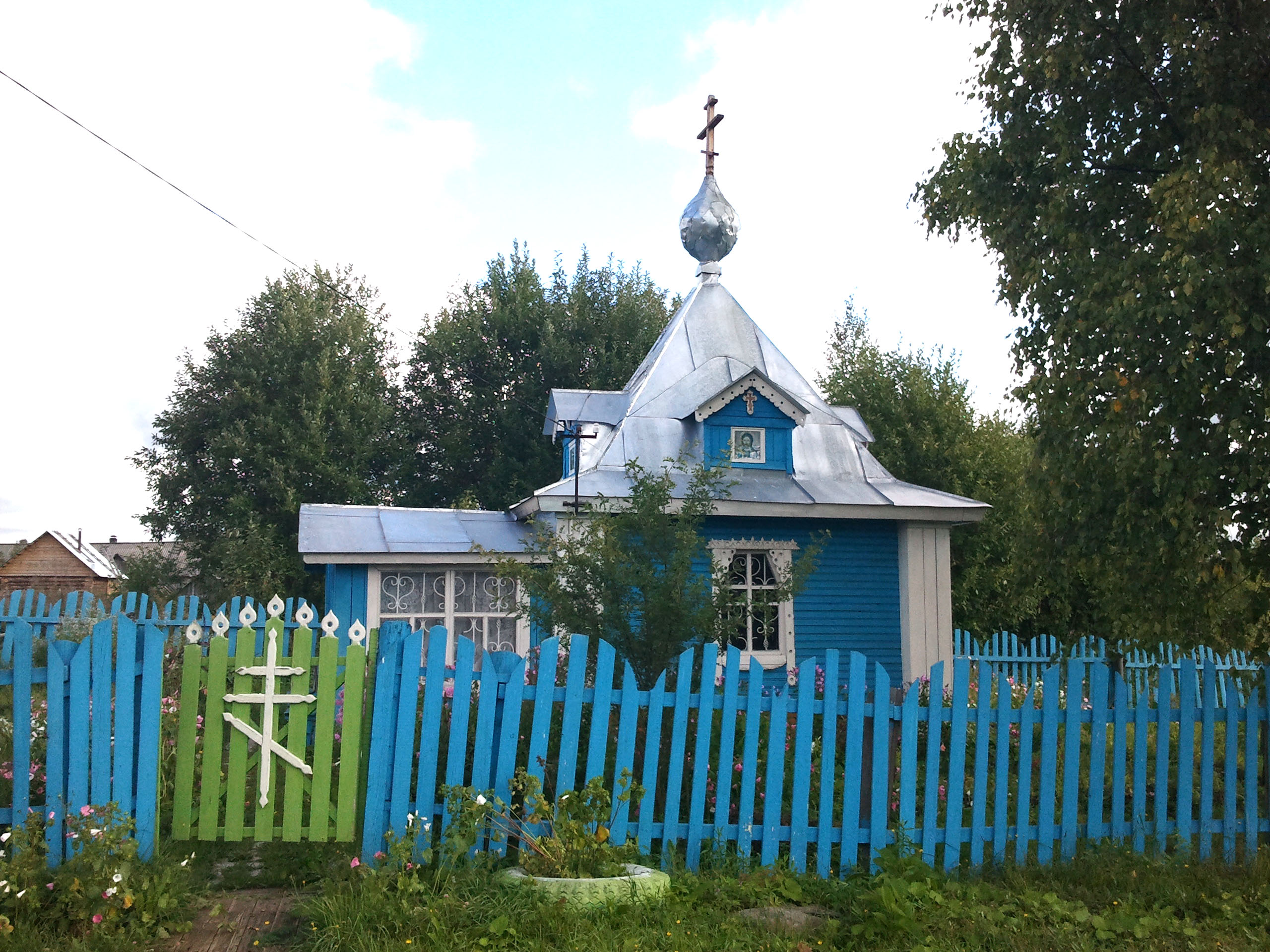
- Chapel in the Nizhne-Kubensky settlement

- Location within Vologda Oblast Location within Russia
- Coordinates: 59°58′N 39°56′E
- Country: Russia
- Region: Vologda Oblast
- District: Kharovsky District
- Time zone: UTC+3:00

Nizhne-Kubensky (Russian: Нижне-Кубенский) is a rural locality (a settlement) in Kubenskoye Rural Settlement, Kharovsky District, Vologda Oblast, Russia. The population was 248 as of 2010. There are 8 streets.

== Geography ==
Nizhne-Kubensky is located 29 km northwest of Kharovsk (the district's administrative centre) by road. Zarubino is the nearest rural locality.
