= Korovinskaya, Kharovsky District, Vologda Oblast =

Korovinskaya Коровинская
- Village
- Location within Vologda Oblast Location within Russia
- Coordinates: 60°00′N 40°31′E
- Country: Russia
- Region: Vologda Oblast
- District: Kharovsky District
- Time zone: UTC+3:00

Korovinskaya (Russian: Коровинская) is a rural locality (a village) in Ilyinskoye Rural Settlement, Kharovsky District, Vologda Oblast, Russia. The population was 8 as of 2002.

== Geography ==
Korovinskaya is located 22 km northeast of Kharovsk (the district's administrative centre) by road. Sotonikha is the nearest rural locality.
