= Maximikha, Vologda Oblast =

Maximikha Максимиха
- Village
- Location within Vologda Oblast Location within Russia
- Coordinates: 59°55′N 39°53′E
- Country: Russia
- Region: Vologda Oblast
- District: Kharovsky District
- Time zone: UTC+3:00

Maximikha (Russian: Максимиха) is a rural locality (a village) in Kubenskoye Rural Settlement, Kharovsky District, Vologda Oblast, Russia. The population was 1 as of 2002.

== Geography ==
Maximikha is located 21 km west of Kharovsk (the district's administrative centre) by road. Korkinskoye is the nearest rural locality.
