= Ugol, Kharovsky District, Vologda Oblast =

Ugol Угол
- Village
- Location within Vologda Oblast Location within Russia
- Coordinates: 60°07′N 39°39′E
- Country: Russia
- Region: Vologda Oblast
- District: Kharovsky District
- Time zone: UTC+3:00

Ugol (Russian: Угол) is a rural locality (a village) in Kumzerskoye Rural Settlement, Kharovsky District, Vologda Oblast, Russia. The population was 6 as of 2002.

== Geography ==
Ugol is located 48 km northwest of Kharovsk (the district's administrative centre) by road. Nazarikha is the nearest rural locality.
