= Lukino, Kharovsky District, Vologda Oblast =

Lukino Лукино
- Village
- Location within Vologda Oblast Location within Russia
- Coordinates: 60°07′N 39°56′E
- Country: Russia
- Region: Vologda Oblast
- District: Kharovsky District
- Time zone: UTC+3:00

Lukino (Russian: Лукино) is a rural locality (a village) in Shapshinskoye Rural Settlement, Kharovsky District, Vologda Oblast, Russia. The population was 16 as of 2002.

== Geography ==
Lukino is located 27 km northwest of Kharovsk (the district's administrative centre) by road. Shapsha is the nearest rural locality.
