= Zarubino, Vologda Oblast =

Zarubino Зарубино
- Village
- Location within Vologda Oblast Location within Russia
- Coordinates: 59°58′N 39°56′E
- Country: Russia
- Region: Vologda Oblast
- District: Kharovsky District
- Time zone: UTC+3:00

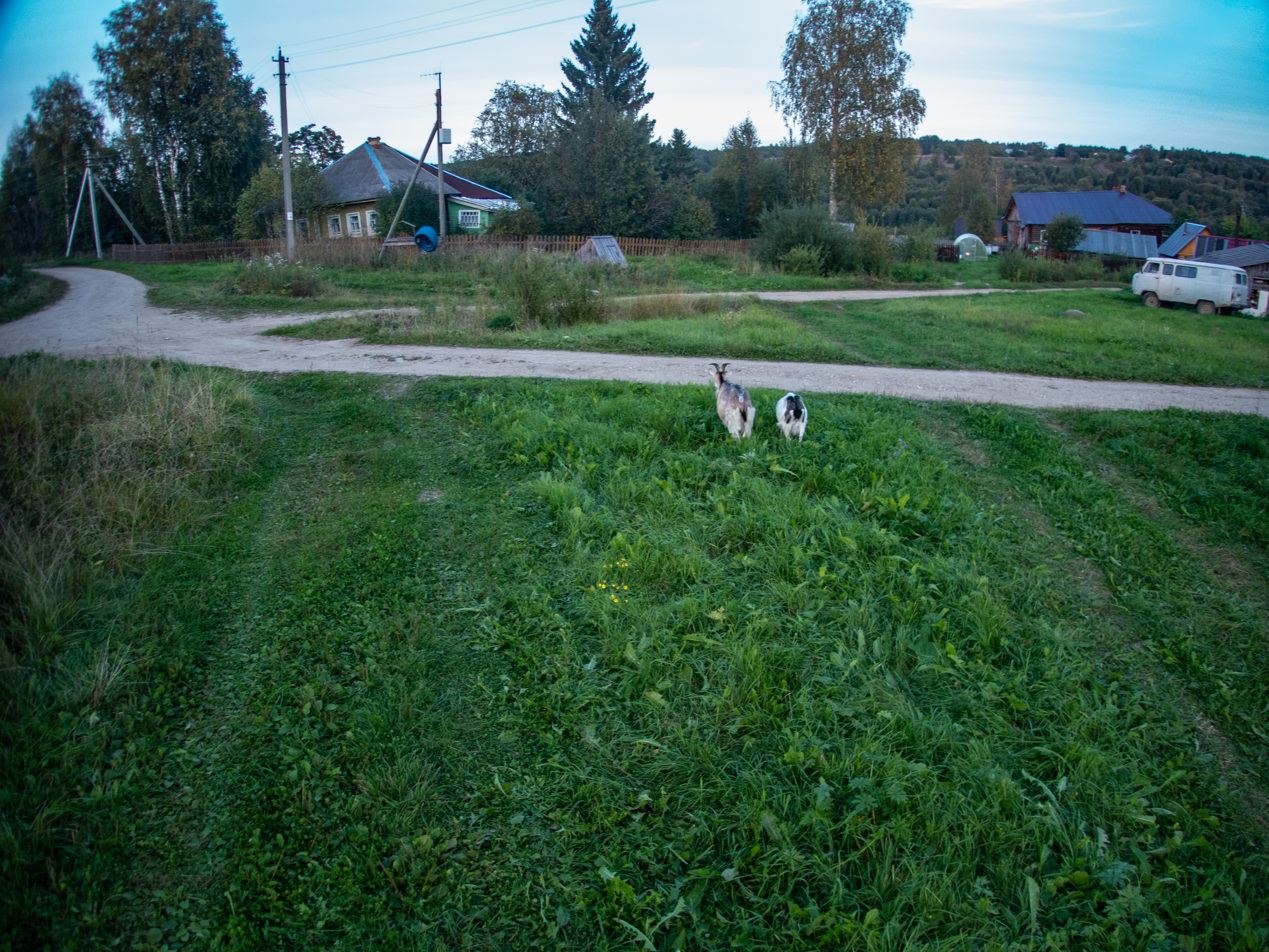
Zarubino village in 2024 in the northern outskirts of the village of Nizhne-Kubensky. Torgovaya Street is on the left.

Zarubino (Russian: Зарубино) is a rural locality (a village) in Kubenskoye Rural Settlement, Kharovsky District, Vologda Oblast, Russia. The population was 18 as of 2002.

== Geography ==
Zarubino is located 29 km northwest of Kharovsk (the district's administrative centre) by road. Nizhne-Kubensky is the nearest rural locality.
