= Tomashka =

Tomashka Томашка
- Settlement
- Location within Vologda Oblast Location within Russia
- Coordinates: 59°47′N 40°39′E
- Country: Russia
- Region: Vologda Oblast
- District: Kharovsky District
- Time zone: UTC+3:00

Tomashka (Russian: Томашка) is a rural locality (a settlement) in Semigorodneye Rural Settlement, Kharovsky District, Vologda Oblast, Russia. The population was 171 as of 2002. There are 6 streets.

== Geography ==
Tomashka is located 91 km southeast of Kharovsk (the district's administrative centre) by road. 17 km is the nearest rural locality.
