= Osipikha, Kharovsky District, Vologda Oblast =

Osipikha Осипиха
- Village
- Location within Vologda Oblast Location within Russia
- Coordinates: 60°01′N 40°06′E
- Country: Russia
- Region: Vologda Oblast
- District: Kharovsky District
- Time zone: UTC+3:00

Osipikha (Russian: Осипиха) is a rural locality (a village) in Kubenskoye Rural Settlement, Kharovsky District, Vologda Oblast, Russia. The population was 11 as of 2002.

== Geography ==
Osipikha is located 11 km northwest of Kharovsk (the district's administrative centre) by road. Chernukhino is the nearest rural locality.
