= Khalchikha =

Khalchikha Халчиха
- Village
- Location within Vologda Oblast Location within Russia
- Coordinates: 60°05′N 40°29′E
- Country: Russia
- Region: Vologda Oblast
- District: Kharovsky District
- Time zone: UTC+3:00

Khalchikha (Russian: Халчиха) is a rural locality (a village) in Slobodskoye Rural Settlement, Kharovsky District, Vologda Oblast, Russia. The population was 6 as of 2002.

== Geography ==
Khalchikha is located 32 km northeast of Kharovsk (the district's administrative centre) by road. Mishutikha is the nearest rural locality.
