= Varlamovo, Kharovsky District, Vologda Oblast =

Varlamovo Варламово
- Village
- Location within Vologda Oblast Location within Russia
- Coordinates: 59°59′29″N 40°01′10″E
- Country: Russia
- Region: Vologda Oblast
- District: Kharovsky District
- Time zone: UTC+3:00

Varlamovo (Russian: Варламово) is a rural locality (a village) in Kharovskoye Rural Settlement, Kharovsky District, Vologda Oblast, Russia. The population was 9 as of 2002.

== Geography ==
Varlamovo is located 24 km northwest of Kharovsk (the district's administrative centre) by road. Sinyakovo is the nearest rural locality.
