= Ostretsovskaya =

Ostretsovskaya Острецовская
- Village
- Location within Vologda Oblast Location within Russia
- Coordinates: 60°16′N 39°40′E
- Country: Russia
- Region: Vologda Oblast
- District: Kharovsky District
- Time zone: UTC+3:00

Ostretsovskaya (Russian: Острецовская) is a rural locality (a village) in Azletskoye Rural Settlement, Kharovsky District, Vologda Oblast, Russia. The population was 28 as of 2002.

== Geography ==
Ostretsovskaya is located 53 km northwest of Kharovsk (the district's administrative centre) by road. Popovka is the nearest rural locality.
