= Kosarikha =

Kosarikha Косариха
- Village
- Location within Vologda Oblast Location within Russia
- Coordinates: 59°57′N 40°18′E
- Country: Russia
- Region: Vologda Oblast
- District: Kharovsky District
- Time zone: UTC+3:00

Kosarikha (Russian: Косариха) is a rural locality (a village) in Kharovskoye Rural Settlement, Kharovsky District, Vologda Oblast, Russia. The population was 7 as of 2002.

== Geography ==
Kosarikha is located km northeast of Kharovsk (the district's administrative centre) by road. Yesyunikha is the nearest rural locality.
