= Tikhonino =

Tikhonino Тихонино
- Village
- Location within Vologda Oblast Location within Russia
- Coordinates: 60°01′N 40°02′E
- Country: Russia
- Region: Vologda Oblast
- District: Kharovsky District
- Time zone: UTC+3:00

Tikhonino (Russian: Тихонино) is a rural locality (a village) in Kubenskoye Rural Settlement, Kharovsky District, Vologda Oblast, Russia. The population was 2 as of 2002.

== Geography ==
Tikhonino is located 18 km northwest of Kharovsk (the district's administrative centre) by road. Gridinskaya is the nearest rural locality.
