= Fedorovskoye, Kharovsky District, Vologda Oblast =

Fedorovskoye Федоровское
- Village
- Location within Vologda Oblast Location within Russia
- Coordinates: 59°55′N 39°53′E
- Country: Russia
- Region: Vologda Oblast
- District: Kharovsky District
- Time zone: UTC+3:00

Fedorovskoye (Russian: Федоровское) is a rural locality (a village) in Kubenskoye Rural Settlement, Kharovsky District, Vologda Oblast, Russia. The population was 1 as of 2002.

== Geography ==
Fedorovskoye is located 10 km northeast of Kharovsk (the district's administrative centre) by road. Loshchinikha is the nearest rural locality.
