= Sibla =

Sibla Сибла
- Village
- Location within Vologda Oblast Location within Russia
- Coordinates: 59°50′N 40°00′E
- Country: Russia
- Region: Vologda Oblast
- District: Kharovsky District
- Time zone: UTC+3:00

Sibla (Russian: Сибла) is a rural locality (a village) in Kharovskoye Rural Settlement, Kharovsky District, Vologda Oblast, Russia. The population was 5 as of 2002.

== Geography ==
Sibla is located 22 km southwest of Kharovsk (the district's administrative centre) by road. Stegaikha is the nearest rural locality.
