= Sitinsky =

Sitinsky Ситинский
- Settlement
- Location within Vologda Oblast Location within Russia
- Coordinates: 59°59′N 40°09′E
- Country: Russia
- Region: Vologda Oblast
- District: Kharovsky District
- Time zone: UTC+3:00

Sitinsky (Russian: Ситинский) is a rural locality (a settlement) in Kharovskoye Rural Settlement, Kharovsky District, Vologda Oblast, Russia. The population was 227 as of 2002. There are five streets.

== Geography ==
Sitinsky is located 6 km northwest of Kharovsk (the district's administrative centre) by road. Tyushkovskaya is the nearest rural locality.
