= Sotonikha =

Sotonikha Сотониха
- Village
- Location within Vologda Oblast Location within Russia
- Coordinates: 59°59′N 40°30′E
- Country: Russia
- Region: Vologda Oblast
- District: Kharovsky District
- Time zone: UTC+3:00

Sotonikha (Russian: Сотониха) is a rural locality (a village) in Ilyinskoye Rural Settlement, Kharovsky District, Vologda Oblast, Russia. The population was 3 as of 2002.

== Geography ==
Sotonikha is located 21 km northeast of Kharovsk (the district's administrative centre) by road. Korovinskaya is the nearest rural locality.
