= Kozhinskaya, Kharovsky District, Vologda Oblast =

Kozhinskaya Кожинская
- Village
- Location within Vologda Oblast Location within Russia
- Coordinates: 60°07′N 40°33′E
- Country: Russia
- Region: Vologda Oblast
- District: Kharovsky District
- Time zone: UTC+3:00

Kozhinskaya (Russian: Кожинская) is a rural locality (a village) in Slobodskoye Rural Settlement, Kharovsky District, Vologda Oblast, Russia. The population was 15 as of 2002.

== Geography ==
Kozhinskaya is located 34 km northeast of Kharovsk (the district's administrative centre) by road. Arzubikha is the nearest rural locality.
