= Kudryavtsevo, Kharovsky District, Vologda Oblast =

Kudryavtsevo Кудрявцево
- Village
- Location within Vologda Oblast Location within Russia
- Coordinates: 59°56′N 39°53′E
- Country: Russia
- Region: Vologda Oblast
- District: Kharovsky District
- Time zone: UTC+3:00

Kudryavtsevo (Russian: Кудрявцево) is a rural locality (a village) in Kubenskoye Rural Settlement, Kharovsky District, Vologda Oblast, Russia. The population was 7 as of 2002.

== Geography ==
Kudryavtsevo is located 29 km west of Kharovsk (the district's administrative centre) by road. Zimnitsa is the nearest rural locality.
