= Palkovskaya =

Palkovskaya Палковская
- Village
- Location within Vologda Oblast Location within Russia
- Coordinates: 59°58′N 40°13′E
- Country: Russia
- Region: Vologda Oblast
- District: Kharovsky District
- Time zone: UTC+3:00

Palkovskaya (Russian: Палковская) is a rural locality (a village) in Kharovskoye Rural Settlement, Kharovsky District, Vologda Oblast, Russia. The population was 11 as of 2002.

== Geography ==
Palkovskaya is located 8 km northeast of Kharovsk (the district's administrative centre) by road. Ditinskaya is the nearest rural locality.
