= Lysovskaya =

Lysovskaya Лысовская
- Village
- Location within Vologda Oblast Location within Russia
- Coordinates: 60°08′N 39°35′E
- Country: Russia
- Region: Vologda Oblast
- District: Kharovsky District
- Time zone: UTC+3:00

Lysovskaya (Russian: Лысовская) is a rural locality (a village) in Kumzerskoye Rural Settlement, Kharovsky District, Vologda Oblast, Russia. The population was 2 as of 2002.

== Geography ==
Lysovskaya is located 51 km northwest of Kharovsk (the district's administrative centre) by road. Yerofeyevskaya is the nearest rural locality.
