= Bashmanovo =

Bashmanovo Башманово
- Village
- Location within Vologda Oblast Location within Russia
- Coordinates: 60°04′N 40°02′E
- Country: Russia
- Region: Vologda Oblast
- District: Kharovsky District
- Time zone: UTC+3:00

Bashmanovo (Russian: Башманово) is a rural locality (a village) in Kubenskoye Rural Settlement, Kharovsky District, Vologda Oblast, Russia. The population was 11 as of 2002.

== Geography ==
Bashmanovo is located 18 km northwest of Kharovsk (the district's administrative centre) by road. Afonikha is the nearest rural locality.
