= Balukovskaya =

Balukovskaya Балуковская
- Village
- Location within Vologda Oblast Location within Russia
- Coordinates: 60°10′N 39°33′E
- Country: Russia
- Region: Vologda Oblast
- District: Kharovsky District
- Time zone: UTC+3:00

Balukovskaya (Russian: Балуковская) is a rural locality (a village) in Kumzerskoye Rural Settlement, Kharovsky District, Vologda Oblast, Russia. The population was 19 as of 2002.

== Geography ==
Balukovskaya is located 54 km (34 mi) northwest of Kharovsk (the district's administrative centre) by road. Andreyevskaya is the nearest rural locality.
