= Istomikha =

Istomikha Истомиха
- Village
- Location within Vologda Oblast Location within Russia
- Coordinates: 60°16′N 39°39′E
- Country: Russia
- Region: Vologda Oblast
- District: Kharovsky District
- Time zone: UTC+3:00

Istomikha (Russian: Истомиха) is a rural locality (a village) in Azletskoye Rural Settlement, Kharovsky District, Vologda Oblast, Russia. The population was 17 as of 2002.

== Geography ==
Istomikha is located 53 km northwest of Kharovsk (the district's administrative centre) by road. Kogarikha is the nearest rural locality.
