= Knyazhaya, Kharovsky District, Vologda Oblast =

Knyazhaya Княжая
- Village
- Location within Vologda Oblast Location within Russia
- Coordinates: 60°08′N 39°40′E
- Country: Russia
- Region: Vologda Oblast
- District: Kharovsky District
- Time zone: UTC+3:00

Knyazhaya (Russian: Княжая) is a rural locality (a village) in Kumzerskoye Rural Settlement, Kharovsky District, Vologda Oblast, Russia. The population was 20 as of 2002.

== Geography ==
Knyazhaya is located 45 km northwest of Kharovsk (the district's administrative centre) by road. Grishino is the nearest rural locality.
