= Melentyevskaya =

Melentyevskaya Мелентьевская
- Village
- Location within Vologda Oblast Location within Russia
- Coordinates: 60°15′N 39°44′E
- Country: Russia
- Region: Vologda Oblast
- District: Kharovsky District
- Time zone: UTC+3:00

Melentyevskaya (Russian: Мелентьевская) is a rural locality (a village) in Azletskoye Rural Settlement, Kharovsky District, Vologda Oblast, Russia. The population was 5 as of 2002.

== Geography ==
Melentyevskaya is located 48 km northwest of Kharovsk (the district's administrative centre) by road. Ulasovskaya is the nearest rural locality.
