= Pleshavka =

Pleshavka Плешавка
- Village
- Location within Vologda Oblast Location within Russia
- Coordinates: 60°01′N 40°38′E
- Country: Russia
- Region: Vologda Oblast
- District: Kharovsky District
- Time zone: UTC+3:00

Pleshavka (Russian: Плешавка) is a rural locality (a village) in Ilyinskoye Rural Settlement, Kharovsky District, Vologda Oblast, Russia. The population was 13 as of 2002.

== Geography ==
Pleshavka is located 29 km northeast of Kharovsk (the district's administrative centre) by road. Zolotogorka is the nearest rural locality.
