= Ivachinskaya =

Ivachinskaya Ивачинская
- Village
- Location within Vologda Oblast Location within Russia
- Coordinates: 59°57′N 40°22′E
- Country: Russia
- Region: Vologda Oblast
- District: Kharovsky District
- Time zone: UTC+3:00

Ivachinskaya (Russian: Ивачинская) is a rural locality (a village) in Ilyinskoye Rural Settlement, Kharovsky District, Vologda Oblast, Russia. The population was 1 as of 2002.

== Geography ==
Ivachinskaya is located 11 km east of Kharovsk (the district's administrative centre) by road. Spasskaya is the nearest rural locality.
