= Yekimovskaya, Kharovsky District, Vologda Oblast =

Yekimovskaya Екимовская
- Village
- Location within Vologda Oblast Location within Russia
- Coordinates: 59°58′N 39°58′E
- Country: Russia
- Region: Vologda Oblast
- District: Kharovsky District
- Time zone: UTC+3:00

Yekimovskaya (Russian: Екимовская) is a rural locality (a village) in Kharovskoye Rural Settlement, Kharovsky District, Vologda Oblast, Russia. The population was 3 as of 2002.

== Geography ==
Yekimovskaya is located 16 km northwest of Kharovsk (the district's administrative centre) by road. Panovskoye is the nearest rural locality.
