= Pankovskaya =

Pankovskaya Паньковская
- Village
- Location within Vologda Oblast Location within Russia
- Coordinates: 60°10′N 39°52′E
- Country: Russia
- Region: Vologda Oblast
- District: Kharovsky District
- Time zone: UTC+3:00

Pankovskaya (Russian: Паньковская) is a rural locality (a village) in Shapshinskoye Rural Settlement, Kharovsky District, Vologda Oblast, Russia. The population was 4 as of 2002.

== Geography ==
Pankovskaya is located 34 km northwest of Kharovsk (the district's administrative centre) by road. Tsiposhevskaya is the nearest rural locality.
