= Mishkovskoye =

Mishkovskoye Мишковское
- Village
- Location within Vologda Oblast Location within Russia
- Coordinates: 59°55′N 39°56′E
- Country: Russia
- Region: Vologda Oblast
- District: Kharovsky District
- Time zone: UTC+3:00

Mishkovskoye (Russian: Мишковское) is a rural locality (a village) in Kharovskoye Rural Settlement, Kharovsky District, Vologda Oblast, Russia. The population was 5 as of 2002.

== Geography ==
Mishkovskoye is located 21 km southwest of Kharovsk (the district's administrative centre) by road. Kharenskoye is the nearest rural locality.
