= Poshivchikha =

Poshivchikha Пошивчиха
- Village
- Location within Vologda Oblast Location within Russia
- Coordinates: 60°09′N 39°32′E
- Country: Russia
- Region: Vologda Oblast
- District: Kharovsky District
- Time zone: UTC+3:00

Poshivchikha (Russian: Пошивчиха) is a rural locality (a village) in Kumzerskoye Rural Settlement, Kharovsky District, Vologda Oblast, Russia. The population was 13 as of 2002.

== Geography ==
Poshivchikha is located 56 km northwest of Kharovsk (the district's administrative centre) by road. Odenyevskaya is the nearest rural locality.
