= Plesnikha =

Plesnikha Плесниха
- Village
- Location within Vologda Oblast Location within Russia
- Coordinates: 60°15′N 39°37′E
- Country: Russia
- Region: Vologda Oblast
- District: Kharovsky District
- Time zone: UTC+3:00

Plesnikha (Russian: Плесниха) is a rural locality (a village) in Azletskoye Rural Settlement, Kharovsky District, Vologda Oblast, Russia. The population was 6 as of 2002.

== Geography ==
Plesnikha is located 55 km northwest of Kharovsk (the district's administrative centre) by road. Martynikha is the nearest rural locality.
