= Zolotava =

Zolotava Золотава
- Village
- Location within Vologda Oblast Location within Russia
- Coordinates: 60°01′N 40°35′E
- Country: Russia
- Region: Vologda Oblast
- District: Kharovsky District
- Time zone: UTC+3:00

Zolotava (Russian: Золотава) is a rural locality (a village) in Ilyinskoye Rural Settlement, Kharovsky District, Vologda Oblast, Russia. The population was 185 as of 2002.

== Geography ==
Zolotava is located 27 km northeast of Kharovsk (the district's administrative centre) by road. Ishenino is the nearest rural locality.
