= Matveikha-Ramenskaya =

Matveikha-Ramenskaya Матвеиха-Раменская
- Village
- Location within Vologda Oblast Location within Russia
- Coordinates: 60°02′N 40°01′E
- Country: Russia
- Region: Vologda Oblast
- District: Kharovsky District
- Time zone: UTC+3:00

Matveikha-Ramenskaya (Russian: Матвеиха-Раменская) is a rural locality (a village) in Kubenskoye Rural Settlement, Kharovsky District, Vologda Oblast, Russia. The population was 5 as of 2002.

== Geography ==
Matveikha-Ramenskaya is located 20 km northwest of Kharovsk (the district's administrative centre) by road. Tikhonino is the nearest rural locality.
