= Durovskaya =

Durovskaya Дуровская
- Village
- Location within Vologda Oblast Location within Russia
- Coordinates: 60°08′N 39°32′E
- Country: Russia
- Region: Vologda Oblast
- District: Kharovsky District
- Time zone: UTC+3:00

Durovskaya (Russian: Дуровская) is a rural locality (a village) in Kumzerskoye Rural Settlement, Kharovsky District, Vologda Oblast, Russia. The population was 13 as of 2002.

== Geography ==
Durovskaya is located 54 km northwest of Kharovsk (the district's administrative centre) by road. Pavshikha is the nearest rural locality.
