= Savkovskaya =

Savkovskaya Савковская
- Village
- Location within Vologda Oblast Location within Russia
- Coordinates: 60°15′N 40°04′E
- Country: Russia
- Region: Vologda Oblast
- District: Kharovsky District
- Time zone: UTC+3:00

Savkovskaya (Russian: Савковская) is a rural locality (a village) in Razinskoye Rural Settlement, Kharovsky District, Vologda Oblast, Russia. The population was 29 as of 2002.

== Geography ==
Savkovskaya is located 45 km north of Kharovsk (the district's administrative centre) by road. Krasnaya Gorka is the nearest rural locality.
