= Yaskino, Kharovsky District, Vologda Oblast =

Yaskino Яскино
- Village
- Location within Vologda Oblast Location within Russia
- Coordinates: 60°01′N 40°01′E
- Country: Russia
- Region: Vologda Oblast
- District: Kharovsky District
- Time zone: UTC+3:00

Yaskino (Russian: Яскино) is a rural locality (a village) in Kubenskoye Rural Settlement, Kharovsky District, Vologda Oblast, Russia. The population was 10 as of 2002.

== Geography ==
Yaskino is located 19 km northwest of Kharovsk (the district's administrative centre) by road. Mankovo is the nearest rural locality.
