= Ishenino =

Ishenino Ишенино
- Village
- Location within Vologda Oblast Location within Russia
- Coordinates: 60°01′N 40°36′E
- Country: Russia
- Region: Vologda Oblast
- District: Kharovsky District
- Time zone: UTC+3:00

Ishenino (Russian: Ишенино) is a rural locality (a village) in Ilyinskoye Rural Settlement, Kharovsky District, Vologda Oblast, Russia. The population was 16 as of 2002.

== Geography ==
Ishenino is located 27 km northeast of Kharovsk (the district's administrative centre) by road. Zolotava is the nearest rural locality.
