= Tsiposhevskaya =

Tsiposhevskaya Ципошевская
- Village
- Location within Vologda Oblast Location within Russia
- Coordinates: 60°10′N 39°52′E
- Country: Russia
- Region: Vologda Oblast
- District: Kharovsky District
- Time zone: UTC+3:00

Tsiposhevskaya (Russian: Ципошевская) is a rural locality (a village) in Shapshinskoye Rural Settlement, Kharovsky District, Vologda Oblast, Russia. The population was 2 as of 2002.

== Geography ==
Tsiposhevskaya is located 35 km northwest of Kharovsk (the district's administrative centre) by road. Derevenka Shapshinskaya is the nearest rural locality.
