= Timonikha =

Timonikha (Russian: Тимониха) is the name of several rural localities (villages) in Russia:

- Timonikha, Ivanovo Oblast, a village in Kineshemsky District of Ivanovo Oblast
- Timonikha, Azletsky Selsoviet, Kharovsky District, Vologda Oblast, a village in Azletsky Selsoviet of Kharovsky District of Vologda Oblast
- Timonikha, Kharovsky Selsoviet, Kharovsky District, Vologda Oblast, a village in Kharovsky Selsoviet of Kharovsky District of Vologda Oblast
