= Bugra, Vologda Oblast =

Bugra Бугра
- Village
- Location within Vologda Oblast Location within Russia
- Coordinates: 60°16′N 39°45′E
- Country: Russia
- Region: Vologda Oblast
- District: Kharovsky District
- Time zone: UTC+3:00

Bugra (Russian: Бугра) is a rural locality (a village) in Azletskoye Rural Settlement, Kharovsky District, Vologda Oblast, Russia. The population was 8 as of 2002.

== Geography ==
Bugra is located 50 km northwest of Kharovsk (the district's administrative centre) by road. Sergozero is the nearest rural locality.
