= Shilykovo =

Shilykovo Шилыково
- Village
- Location within Vologda Oblast Location within Russia
- Coordinates: 59°57′N 40°27′E
- Country: Russia
- Region: Vologda Oblast
- District: Kharovsky District
- Time zone: UTC+3:00

Shilykovo (Russian: Шилыково) is a rural locality (a village) in Mikhaylovskoye Rural Settlement, Kharovsky District, Vologda Oblast, Russia. The population was 8 as of 2002.

== Geography ==
Shilykovo is located 15 km east of Kharovsk (the district's administrative centre) by road. Alferovskaya is the nearest rural locality.
