= Sablukovo =

Sablukovo Саблуково
- Village
- Location within Vologda Oblast Location within Russia
- Coordinates: 60°08′N 40°13′E
- Country: Russia
- Region: Vologda Oblast
- District: Kharovsky District
- Time zone: UTC+3:00

Sablukovo (Russian: Саблуково) is a rural locality (a village) in Razinskoye Rural Settlement, Kharovsky District, Vologda Oblast, Russia. The population was 3 as of 2002.

== Geography ==
Sablukovo is located 36 km north of Kharovsk (the district's administrative centre) by road. Sokolovskaya is the nearest rural locality.
