= Glazikha =

Glazikha Глазиха
- Village
- Location within Vologda Oblast Location within Russia
- Coordinates: 60°10′N 39°35′E
- Country: Russia
- Region: Vologda Oblast
- District: Kharovsky District
- Time zone: UTC+3:00

Glazikha (Russian: Глазиха) is a rural locality (a village) in Kumzerskoye Rural Settlement, Kharovsky District, Vologda Oblast, Russia. The population was 11 as of 2002.

== Geography ==
Glazikha is located 52 km northwest of Kharovsk (the district's administrative centre) by road. Balukovskaya is the nearest rural locality.
