= Oleshkovo =

Oleshkovo Олешково
- Village
- Location within Vologda Oblast Location within Russia
- Coordinates: 60°16′N 40°14′E
- Country: Russia
- Region: Vologda Oblast
- District: Kharovsky District
- Time zone: UTC+3:00

Oleshkovo (Russian: Олешково) is a rural locality (a village) in Razinskoye Rural Settlement, Kharovsky District, Vologda Oblast, Russia. The population was 11 as of 2002.

== Geography ==
Oleshkovo is located 50 km north of Kharovsk (the district's administrative centre) by road. Kozlovo is the nearest rural locality.
