= Zherlichikha =

Zherlichikha Жерличиха
- Village
- Location within Vologda Oblast Location within Russia
- Coordinates: 59°58′N 40°27′E
- Country: Russia
- Region: Vologda Oblast
- District: Kharovsky District
- Time zone: UTC+3:00

Zherlichikha (Russian: Жерличиха) is a rural locality (a village) in Ilyinskoye Rural Settlement, Kharovsky District, Vologda Oblast, Russia. The population was 19 as of 2002.

== Geography ==
Zherlichikha is located 17 km northeast of Kharovsk (the district's administrative centre) by road. Parshinskaya is the nearest rural locality.
