= Khomok =

Khomok Хомок
- Village
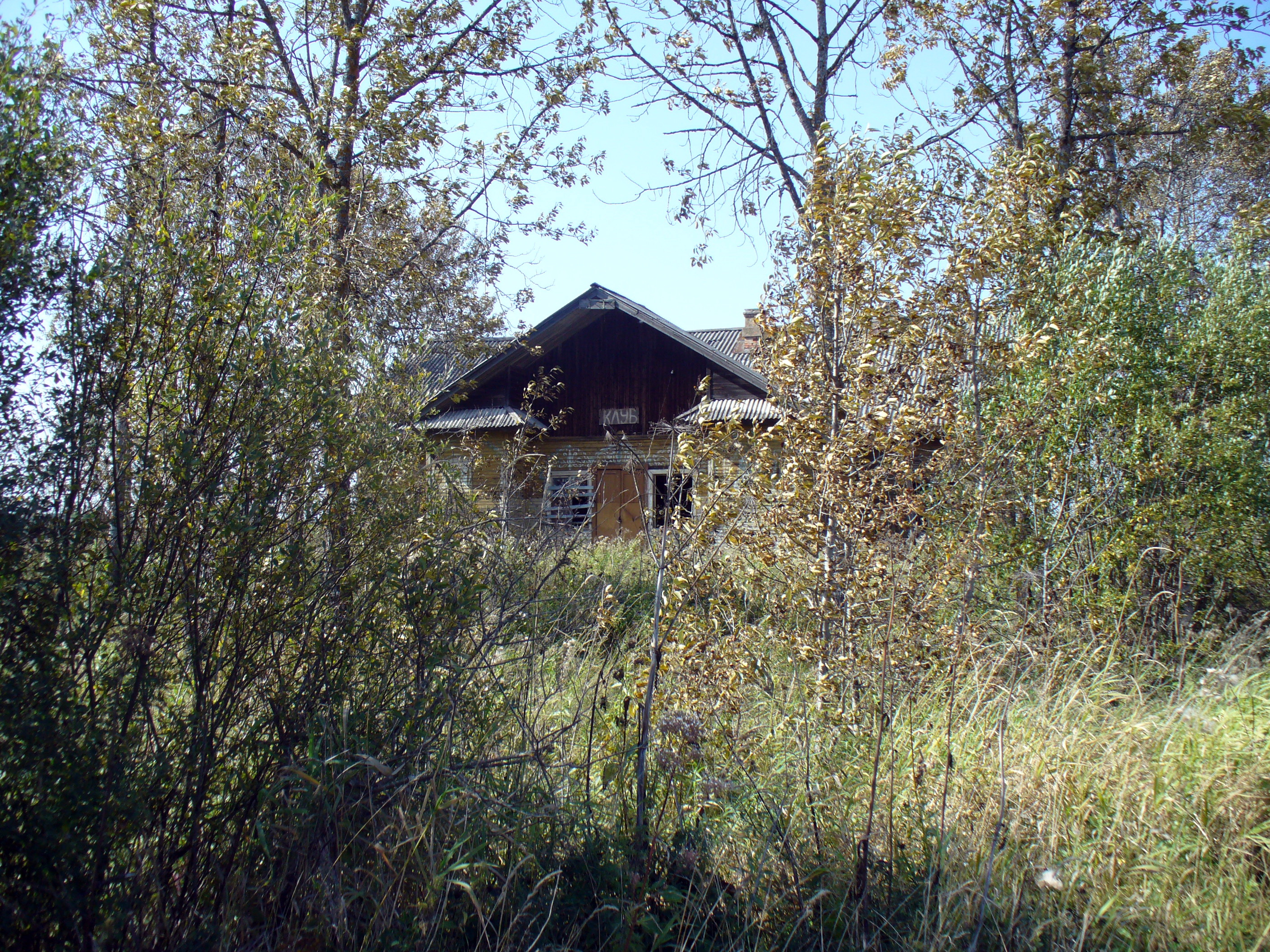
- Khomok village

- Location within Vologda Oblast Location within Russia
- Coordinates: 59°59′N 40°08′E
- Country: Russia
- Region: Vologda Oblast
- District: Kharovsky District
- Time zone: UTC+3:00

Khomok (Russian: Хомок) is a rural locality (a village) in Kharovskoye Rural Settlement, Kharovsky District, Vologda Oblast, Russia. The population was 1 as of 2002.

== Geography ==
Khomok is located 8 km northwest of Kharovsk (the district's administrative centre) by road. Sitinsky is the nearest rural locality.
