= Semigorodnyaya =

Semigorodnyaya Семигородняя
- Station
- Location within Vologda Oblast Location within Russia
- Coordinates: 59°46′N 40°11′E
- Country: Russia
- Region: Vologda Oblast
- District: Kharovsky District
- Time zone: UTC+3:00

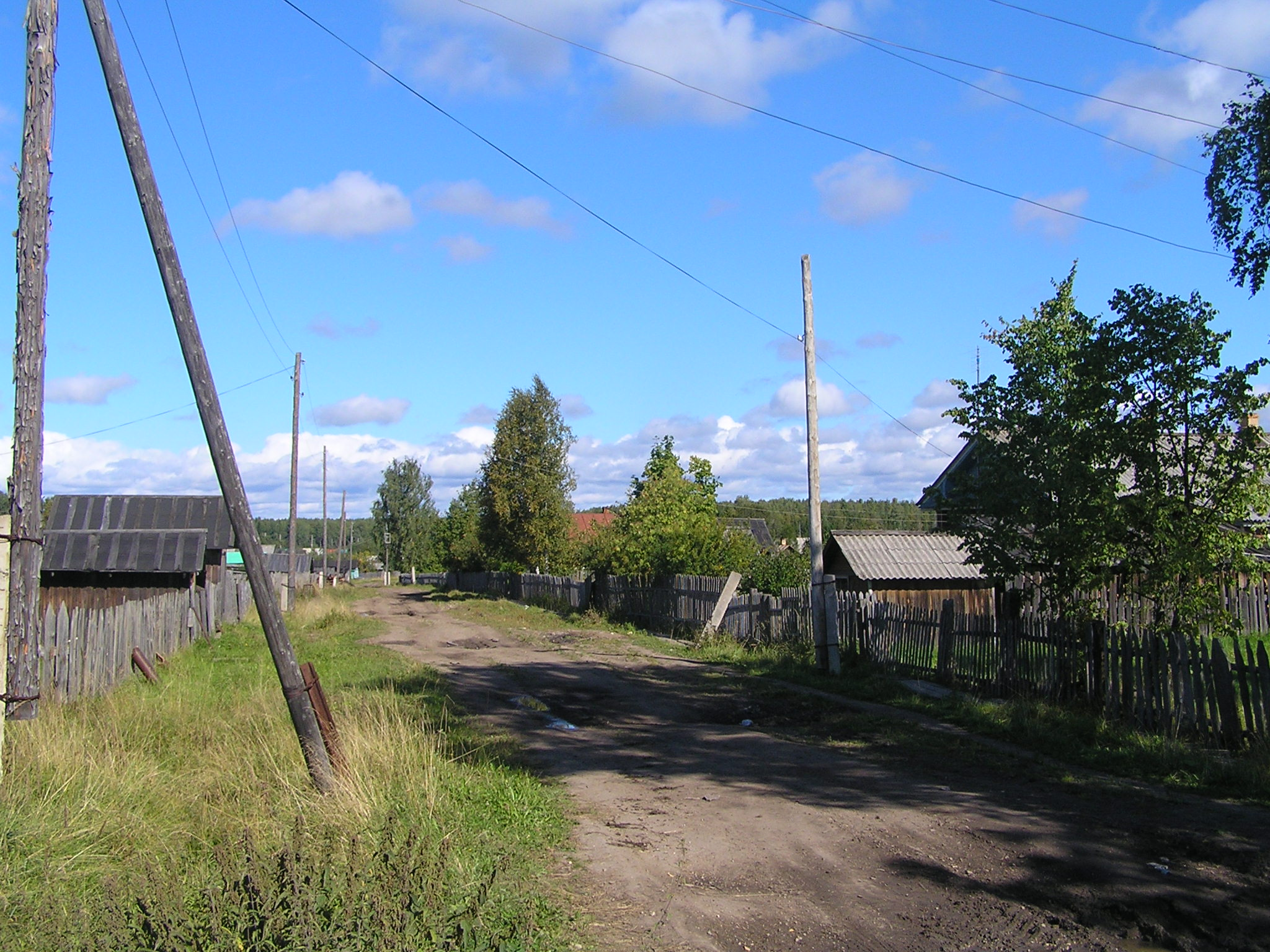
path in Semigorodnyaya

Semigorodnyaya (Russian: Семигородняя) is a rural locality (a station) and the administrative center of Semigorodneye Rural Settlement, Kharovsky District, Vologda Oblast, Russia. The population was 1,686 as of 2002.

== Geography ==
Semigorodnyaya is located 30 km south of Kharovsk (the district's administrative centre) by road. Vozrozhdeniye is the nearest rural locality.
