= Shenurovo =

Shenurovo Шенурово
- Village
- Location within Vologda Oblast Location within Russia
- Coordinates: 59°58′N 39°57′E
- Country: Russia
- Region: Vologda Oblast
- District: Kharovsky District
- Time zone: UTC+3:00

Shenurovo (Russian: Шенурово) is a rural locality (a village) in Kubenskoye Rural Settlement, Kharovsky District, Vologda Oblast, Russia. The population was 16 as of 2002, however the population has been estimated to have significantly increased over the 2005 to 2007 period.

== Geography ==
Shenurovo is located 28 km northwest of Kharovsk (the district's administrative centre) by road. Nizhne-Kubensky is the nearest rural locality.
