= Kharovsky District =

Kharovsky District Харовский район (Russian)
- District
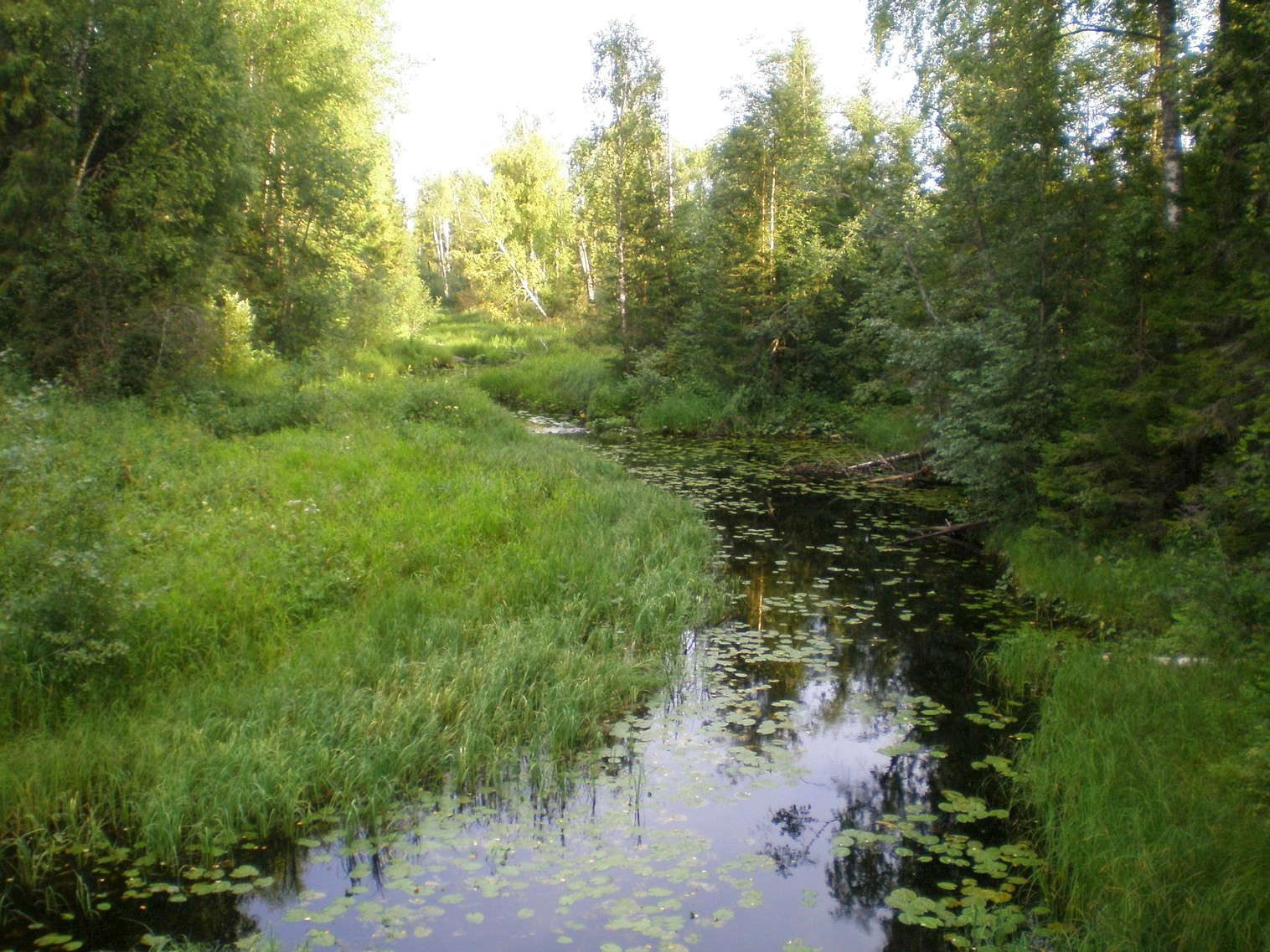
- The Verkhnyaya Kizma River in Kharovsky District

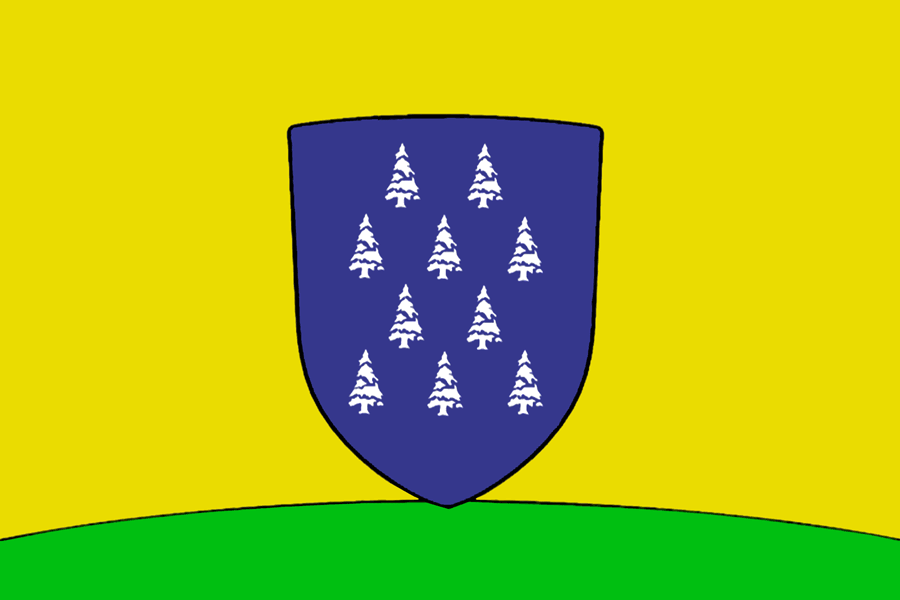
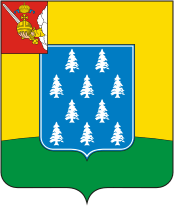
- Flag Coat of arms
- Location of Kharovsky District in Vologda Oblast
- Coordinates: 59°57′N 40°12′E
- Country: Russia
- Federal subject: Vologda Oblast
- Established: July 15, 1929
- Administrative center: Kharovsk

Area
  - Total: 3,600 km^{2} (1,400 sq mi)

Population (2010 Census)
  - Total: 16,622
  - Density: 4.6/km^{2} (12/sq mi)
  - Urban: 60.6%
  - Rural: 39.4%

Administrative structure
  - Administrative divisions: 1 Towns of district significance, 11 Selsoviets
  - Inhabited localities: 1 cities/towns, 388 rural localities

Municipal structure
  - Municipally incorporated as: Kharovsky Municipal District
  - Municipal divisions: 1 urban settlements, 5 rural settlements
- Time zone: UTC+3 (MSK)
- OKTMO ID: 19652000
- Website: http://www.haradm.ru

Kharovsky District (Russian: Ха́ровский райо́н) is an administrative and municipal district (raion), one of the twenty-six in Vologda Oblast, Russia. It is located in the center of the oblast and borders Vozhegodsky District in the north, Syamzhensky District in the east, Sokolsky District in the south, and Ust-Kubinsky District in the west. The area of the district is 3,600 square kilometers (1,400 sq mi). Its administrative center is the town of Kharovsk. Population: 16,622 (2010 census); 20,576 (2002 Census); 25,219 (1989 Soviet census). The population of Kharovsk accounts for 60.6% of the district's total population.

== Geography ==
Much of the area of the district belongs to the basin of the Kubena River. The Kubena crosses the district from east to west, and, in particular, the town of Kharovsk is located on the Kubena. A major tributary of the Kubena within the district is the Sit. The basin of the Sit occupies the northwestern part of the district. The southern part of the district belongs to the basin of the Dvinitsa, a left tributary of the Sukhona. The whole area of the district thus belongs to the basin of the Northern Dvina and to the White Sea basin.

There are several lakes of considerable size in the district. The biggest one, Lake Katromskoye, drains into the Katroma River, which runs northeast and joins the Kubena in the east of the district.

Much of the district is covered by coniferous forests. There are swamps, in particular, in the valley of the Sit and in the south of the district.

== History ==
The area was populated by Finnic peoples and then colonized by the Novgorod Republic. After the fall of Novgorod, the area became a part of the Grand Duchy of Moscow. In the course of the administrative reform carried out in 1708 by Peter the Great, the area was included into Archangelgorod Governorate (east). In 1780, Archangelogorod Governorate was abolished and transformed into Vologda Viceroyalty, and in 1796 the latter was split into Arkhangelsk and Vologda Governorates. What now is Kharovsky District was then a part of Kadnikovsky Uyezd of Vologda Governorate.

Due to its remoteness from the main trade routes connecting Northern Russia with the White Sea, the area was sparsely populated until the end of the 19th century. In 1894, the construction of the railway line between Vologda and Arkhangelsk started. It was decided that the railway should run over the shortest route rather than pass through existing settlements, and it was eventually built through the present territory of the district.

On July 15, 1929, the uyezds were abolished, the governorates were merged into Northern Krai, and Kharovsky District was established among others. It became a part of Vologda Okrug of Northern Krai. In the following years, the first-level administrative division of Russia kept changing. In 1936, the krai itself was transformed into Northern Oblast. In 1937, Northern Oblast was split into Arkhangelsk Oblast and Vologda Oblast. Kharovsky District remained in Vologda Oblast ever since.

In 1931, Syamzhensky District was abolished and split between Kharovsky and Totemsky Districts. In 1935, it was re-established. During the abortive administrative reform of 1962-1965, Syamzhensky District was merged into Kharovsky District. In 1965, it was re-established again.

== Administrative and municipal divisions ==
As an administrative division, the district is divided into one town of district significance (Kharovsk) and eleven selsoviets. As a municipal division, the district is incorporated as Kharovsky Municipal District and is divided into one urban and ten rural settlements. The municipal district includes all of the inhabited localities of the administrative district, with the exception of the settlements of 47 km, Druzhba, and Sogorki, which are municipally a part of Syamzhensky District.

== Economy ==
=== Industry ===
The economy of the district is based on timber industry.

=== Agriculture ===
Agriculture in the district is mostly concentrated on cattle breeding with milk and meat production.

=== Transportation ===
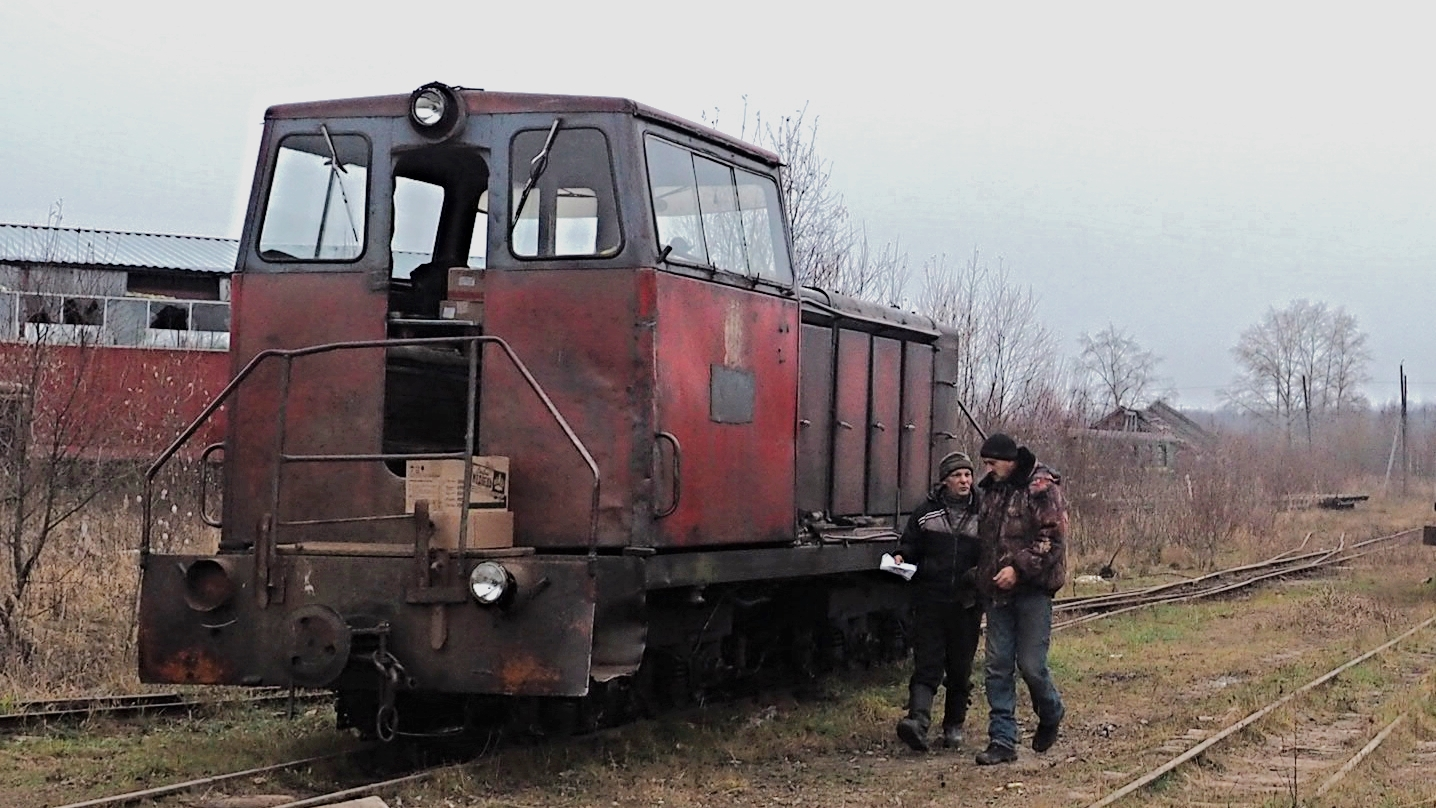
Semigorodnyaya Narrow Gauge Railroad

The railway connecting Vologda and Arkhangelsk crosses the district from south to north. The main stations within the district are Kharovskaya and Semigorodnyaya. Semigorodnyaya was the starting point of the Semigorodnyaya Narrow Gauge Railroad, built in the 1940s to facilitate transportation of timber. The network was rather extensive and went well into Syamzhensky District, with the total length of about 200 kilometers (120 mi). By the first decade of the 2000s, most of the tracks were demolished.

Roads connect Kharovsk with Syamzha in the east and Sokol in the south.

None of the rivers are navigable within the limits of the district.

== Culture and recreation ==
The district contains twenty objects classified as cultural and historical heritage of local significance. Most of these are churches built prior to 1917.

The only museum in the district is the Kharovsk Museum of Art and History which was founded in 1967 and reopened in 2000. The museum is located in Kharovsk.

Vasily Belov, a Russian author and a representative of the Village Prose movement, was born in 1932 in the village of Timonikha of Kharovsky District. In 2011, a folkloric and literature festival was held in Timonikha related to the beginning of hay-making season.

== Sports ==
One of the races of the Motocross Cup of Russia is held in July every year in the district close to Kharovsk (in the Cup schedule, it is denoted as the Kharovsk race).

== People ==
- Alexei Pakhomov (1900-1973)
- Vasily Belov (1932-2012)
