= Timoninskaya =

Timoninskaya Тимонинская
- Village
- Location within Vologda Oblast Location within Russia
- Coordinates: 60°24′N 41°13′E
- Country: Russia
- Region: Vologda Oblast
- District: Vozhegodsky District
- Time zone: UTC+3:00

Timoninskaya (Russian: Тимонинская) is a rural locality (a village) in Mishutinskoye Rural Settlement, Vozhegodsky District, Vologda Oblast, Russia. The population was 2 as of 2002.

== Geography ==
The distance to Vozhega is 73 km, to Mishutinskaya is 7 km. Yesinskaya, Alferyevskaya, Loshchinskaya, Glazunovskaya are the nearest rural localities.
