= Surkovskaya =

Surkovskaya Сурковская
- Village
- Location within Vologda Oblast Location within Russia
- Coordinates: 60°32′N 39°33′E
- Country: Russia
- Region: Vologda Oblast
- District: Vozhegodsky District
- Time zone: UTC+3:00

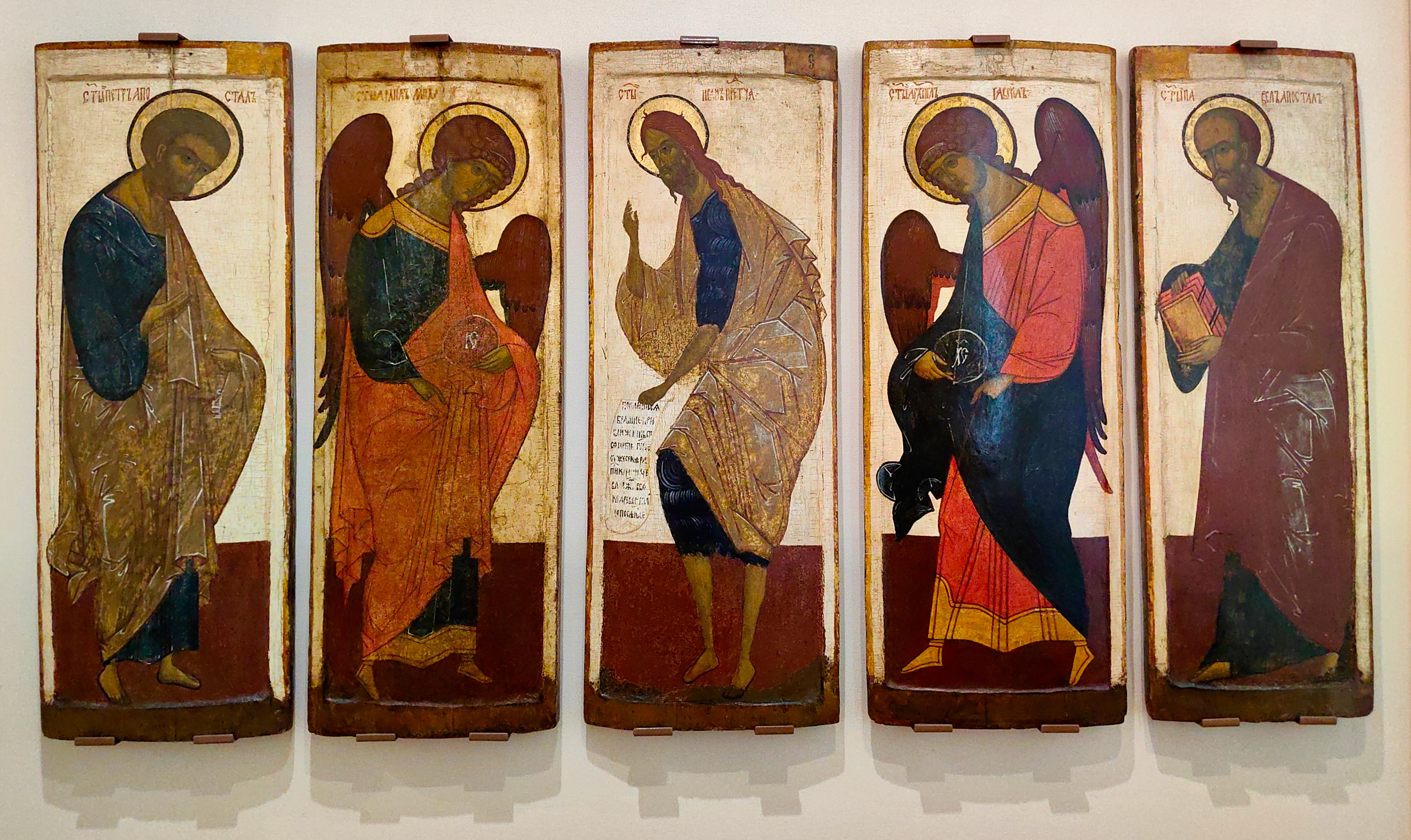
Novgorod Museum-Reserve - Deesis Row - 16th Century - From the Padchevarskaya Church of the Archangel Michael in Surkovskaya village.

Surkovskaya (Russian: Сурковская) is a rural locality (a village) in Beketovskoye Rural Settlement, Vozhegodsky District, Vologda Oblast, Russia. The population was 50 as of 2002.

== Geography ==
Surkovskaya is located 47 km northwest of Vozhega (the district's administrative centre) by road. Baranovskaya is the nearest rural locality.
