= Vasilyevskaya, Yavengskoye Rural Settlement, Vozhegodsky District, Vologda Oblast =

Vasilyevskaya Васильевская
- Village
- Location within Vologda Oblast Location within Russia
- Coordinates: 60°31′N 40°33′E
- Country: Russia
- Region: Vologda Oblast
- District: Vozhegodsky District
- Time zone: UTC+3:00

Vasilyevskaya (Russian: Васильевская) is a rural locality (a village) in Yavengskoye Rural Settlement, Vozhegodsky District, Vologda Oblast, Russia. The population was 2 as of 2002.

== Geography ==
The distance to Vozhega is 45 km, to Baza is 24 km. Ust-Votcha, Tarasovskaya, Maleyevskaya are the nearest rural localities.
