= Yurkovskaya, Vologda Oblast =

Yurkovskaya Юрковская
- Village
- Location within Vologda Oblast Location within Russia
- Coordinates: 60°30′N 40°59′E
- Country: Russia
- Region: Vologda Oblast
- District: Vozhegodsky District
- Time zone: UTC+3:00

Yurkovskaya (Russian: Юрковская) is a rural locality (a village) in Nizhneslobodskoye Rural Settlement, Vozhegodsky District, Vologda Oblast, Russia. The population was 18 as of 2002.

== Geography ==
Yurkovskaya is located 50 km east of Vozhega (the district's administrative centre) by road. Todelovskaya is the nearest rural locality.
