= Levinskaya, Tiginskoye Rural Settlement, Vozhegodsky District, Vologda Oblast =

Levinskaya Левинская
- Village
- Location within Vologda Oblast Location within Russia
- Coordinates: 60°28′N 39°51′E
- Country: Russia
- Region: Vologda Oblast
- District: Vozhegodsky District
- Time zone: UTC+3:00

Levinskaya (Russian: Левинская) is a rural locality (a village) in Tiginskoye Rural Settlement, Vozhegodsky District, Vologda Oblast, Russia. The population was 53 as of 2002.

== Geography ==
The distance to Vozhega is 21 km, to Gridino is 1 km. Konevka, Savinskaya, Shchegolikha, Malaya, Petrovka, Ospodarevskaya, Gridino, Stepanikha, Nikitinskaya, Leshchevka are the nearest rural localities.
