= Anufriyevskaya =

Anufriyevskaya Ануфриевская
- Village
- Location within Vologda Oblast Location within Russia
- Coordinates: 60°32′N 39°20′E
- Country: Russia
- Region: Vologda Oblast
- District: Vozhegodsky District
- Time zone: UTC+3:00

Anufriyevskaya (Russian: Ануфриевская) is a rural locality (a village) in Beketovskoye Rural Settlement, Vozhegodsky District, Vologda Oblast, Russia. The population was 15 as of 2002.

== Geography ==
Anufriyevskaya is located 61 km northwest of Vozhega (the district's administrative centre) by road. Ruchyevskaya is the nearest rural locality.
