= Kostyuninskaya, Vozhegodsky District, Vologda Oblast =

Kostyuninskaya Костюнинская
- Village
- Location within Vologda Oblast Location within Russia
- Coordinates: 60°21′N 40°54′E
- Country: Russia
- Region: Vologda Oblast
- District: Vozhegodsky District
- Time zone: UTC+3:00

Kostyuninskaya (Russian: Костюнинская) is a rural locality (a village) in Mityukovskoye Rural Settlement, Vozhegodsky District, Vologda Oblast, Russia. The population was 83 as of 2002.

== Geography ==
The distance to Vozhega is 72 km, to Sosnovitsa is 4 km. Popovka, Vasilyevskaya, Timoshinskaya are the nearest rural localities.
