= Sosnovitsa =

Sosnovitsa Сосновица
- Village
- Location within Vologda Oblast Location within Russia
- Coordinates: 60°21′N 40°50′E
- Country: Russia
- Region: Vologda Oblast
- District: Vozhegodsky District
- Time zone: UTC+3:00

Sosnovitsa (Russian: Сосновица) is a rural locality (a village) and the administrative center of Mityukovskoye Rural Settlement, Vozhegodsky District, Vologda Oblast, Russia. The population was 215 as of 2002.

== Geography ==
Sosnovitsa is located 61 km southeast of Vozhega (the district's administrative centre) by road. Grishinskaya is the nearest rural locality.
