= Pestinskaya =

Pestinskaya Пестинская
- Village
- Location within Vologda Oblast Location within Russia
- Coordinates: 60°33′N 40°18′E
- Country: Russia
- Region: Vologda Oblast
- District: Vozhegodsky District
- Time zone: UTC+3:00

Pestinskaya (Russian: Пестинская) is a rural locality (a village) in Yavengskoye Rural Settlement, Vozhegodsky District, Vologda Oblast, Russia. The population was 1 as of 2002.

== Geography ==
Pestinskaya is located 16 km northeast of Vozhega (the district's administrative centre) by road. Bykovskaya is the nearest rural locality.
