= Osiyevskaya =

Osiyevskaya Осиевская
- Village
- Location within Vologda Oblast Location within Russia
- Coordinates: 60°31′N 39°35′E
- Country: Russia
- Region: Vologda Oblast
- District: Vozhegodsky District
- Time zone: UTC+3:00

Osiyevskaya (Russian: Осиевская) is a rural locality (a village) in Beketovskoye Rural Settlement, Vozhegodsky District, Vologda Oblast, Russia. The population was 13 as of 2002.

== Geography ==
Osiyevskaya is located 47 km northwest of Vozhega (the district's administrative centre) by road. Kubinskaya is the nearest rural locality.
