= Tingotomo =

Tingotomo Тинготомо
- Village
- Location within Vologda Oblast Location within Russia
- Coordinates: 60°25′N 39°17′E
- Country: Russia
- Region: Vologda Oblast
- District: Vozhegodsky District
- Time zone: UTC+3:00

Tingotomo (Russian: Тинготомо) is a rural locality (a village) in Beketovskoye Rural Settlement, Vozhegodsky District, Vologda Oblast, Russia. The population was 16 as of 2002.

== Geography ==
Tingotomo is located 72 km southwest of Vozhega (the district's administrative centre) by road. Kalikinsky Bereznik is the nearest rural locality.
