= Yagrysh =

Yagrysh Ягрыш
- Village
- Location within Vologda Oblast Location within Russia
- Coordinates: 60°22′N 39°09′E
- Country: Russia
- Region: Vologda Oblast
- District: Vozhegodsky District
- Time zone: UTC+3:00

Yagrysh (Russian: Ягрыш) is a rural locality (a village) in Beketovskoye Rural Settlement, Vozhegodsky District, Vologda Oblast, Russia. The population was 6 as of 2002.

== Geography ==
Yagrysh is located 78 km west of Vozhega (the district's administrative centre) by road. Nikulskaya is the nearest rural locality.
