= Strokavino =

Strokavino Строкавино
- Village
- Location within Vologda Oblast Location within Russia
- Coordinates: 60°19′N 39°12′E
- Country: Russia
- Region: Vologda Oblast
- District: Vozhegodsky District
- Time zone: UTC+3:00

Strokavino (Russian: Строкавино) is a rural locality (a village) in Beketovskoye Rural Settlement, Vozhegodsky District, Vologda Oblast, Russia. The population was 11 as of 2002.

== Geography ==
Strokavino is located 79 km southwest of Vozhega (the district's administrative centre) by road. Konechnaya is the nearest rural locality.
