= Okulovskaya-1 =

Okulovskaya-1 Окуловская-1
- Village
- Location within Vologda Oblast Location within Russia
- Coordinates: 60°26′N 40°19′E
- Country: Russia
- Region: Vologda Oblast
- District: Vozhegodsky District
- Time zone: UTC+3:00

Okulovskaya-1 (Russian: Окуловская-1) is a rural locality (a village) in Vozhegodskoye Urban Settlement, Vozhegodsky District, Vologda Oblast, Russia. The population was 4 as of 2002.

== Geography ==
Okulovskaya-1 is located 9 km southeast of Vozhega (the district's administrative centre) by road. Pelevikha is the nearest rural locality.
