= Levkovskaya =

Levkovskaya Левковская
- Village
- Location within Vologda Oblast Location within Russia
- Coordinates: 60°34′N 40°20′E
- Country: Russia
- Region: Vologda Oblast
- District: Vozhegodsky District
- Time zone: UTC+3:00

Levkovskaya (Russian: Левковская) is a rural locality (a village) in Yavengskoye Rural Settlement, Vozhegodsky District, Vologda Oblast, Russia. The population was 14 as of 2002.

== Geography ==
Levkovskaya is located 25 km northeast of Vozhega (the district's administrative centre) by road. Lupachikha is the nearest rural locality.
