= Nizhnyaya, Vologda Oblast =

Nizhnyaya Нижняя
- Village
- Location within Vologda Oblast Location within Russia
- Coordinates: 60°33′N 39°18′E
- Country: Russia
- Region: Vologda Oblast
- District: Vozhegodsky District
- Time zone: UTC+3:00

Nizhnyaya (Russian: Нижняя) is a rural locality (a village) in Beketovskoye Rural Settlement, Vozhegodsky District, Vologda Oblast, Russia. The population was 69 as of 2002.

== Geography ==
Nizhnyaya is located 64 km northwest of Vozhega (the district's administrative centre) by road. Anufriyevskaya is the nearest rural locality.
