= Kozlovo, Yavengskoye Rural Settlement, Vozhegodsky District, Vologda Oblast =

Kozlovo Козлово
- Village
- Location within Vologda Oblast Location within Russia
- Coordinates: 60°34′N 40°04′E
- Country: Russia
- Region: Vologda Oblast
- District: Vozhegodsky District
- Time zone: UTC+3:00

Kozlovo (Russian: Козлово) is a rural locality (a village) in Yavengskoye Rural Settlement, Vozhegodsky District, Vologda Oblast, Russia. The population was 8 as of 2002.

== Geography ==
The distance to Vozhega is 24 km, to Baza is 5 km. Pavlovskaya, Turabovskaya, Bolshaya Nazarovskaya, Padinskaya are the nearest rural localities.
