= Lobanikha, Vozhegodsky District, Vologda Oblast =

Lobanikha Лобаниха
- Village
- Location within Vologda Oblast Location within Russia
- Coordinates: 60°40′N 39°37′E
- Country: Russia
- Region: Vologda Oblast
- District: Vozhegodsky District
- Time zone: UTC+3:00

Lobanikha (Russian: Лобаниха) is a rural locality (a village) in Tiginskoye Rural Settlement, Vozhegodsky District, Vologda Oblast, Russia. The population was 8 as of 2002.

== Geography ==
Lobanikha is located 52 km northwest of Vozhega (the district's administrative centre) by road. Zavrag is the nearest rural locality.
