= Fedyayevskaya =

Fedyayevskaya Федяевская
- Village
- Location within Vologda Oblast Location within Russia
- Coordinates: 60°36′N 40°35′E
- Country: Russia
- Region: Vologda Oblast
- District: Vozhegodsky District
- Time zone: UTC+3:00

Fedyayevskaya (Russian: Федяевская) is a rural locality (a village) in Yavengskoye Rural Settlement, Vozhegodsky District, Vologda Oblast, Russia. The population was 39 as of 2002.

== Geography ==
Fedyayevskaya is located 31 km northeast of Vozhega (the district's administrative centre) by road. Olekhovskaya is the nearest rural locality.
