= Mitinskaya, Nizhneslobodskoye Rural Settlement, Vozhegodsky District, Vologda Oblast =

Mitinskaya Митинская
- Village
- Location within Vologda Oblast Location within Russia
- Coordinates: 60°31′N 40°57′E
- Country: Russia
- Region: Vologda Oblast
- District: Vozhegodsky District
- Time zone: UTC+3:00

Mitinskaya (Russian: Митинская) is a rural locality (a village) in Nizhneslobodskoye Rural Settlement, Vozhegodsky District, Vologda Oblast, Russia. The population was 19 as of 2002.

== Geography ==
The distance to Vozhega is 56.5 km, to Derevenka is 7.5 km. Guryevskaya, Zaozerye, Karpovskaya are the nearest rural localities.
