= Korgozero =

Korgozero Коргозеро
- Village
- Location within Vologda Oblast Location within Russia
- Coordinates: 60°26′N 39°35′E
- Country: Russia
- Region: Vologda Oblast
- District: Vozhegodsky District
- Time zone: UTC+3:00

Korgozero (Russian: Коргозеро) is a rural locality (a village) in Beketovskoye Rural Settlement, Vozhegodsky District, Vologda Oblast, Russia. The population was 9 as of 2002.

== Geography ==
Korgozero is located 36 km west of Vozhega (the district's administrative centre) by road. Beketovo is the nearest rural locality.
