= Turabovskaya =

Turabovskaya Турабовская
- Village
- Location within Vologda Oblast Location within Russia
- Coordinates: 60°34′N 40°05′E
- Country: Russia
- Region: Vologda Oblast
- District: Vozhegodsky District
- Time zone: UTC+3:00

Turabovskaya (Russian: Турабовская) is a rural locality (a village) in Yavengskoye Rural Settlement, Vozhegodsky District, Vologda Oblast, Russia. The population was 3 as of 2002.

== Geography ==
Turabovskaya is located 14 km northwest of Vozhega (the district's administrative centre) by road. Kozlovo is the nearest rural locality.
