= Tarasovskaya, Yavengskoye Rural Settlement, Vozhegodsky District, Vologda Oblast =

Tarasovskaya Тарасовская
- Village
- Location within Vologda Oblast Location within Russia
- Coordinates: 60°32′N 40°36′E
- Country: Russia
- Region: Vologda Oblast
- District: Vozhegodsky District
- Time zone: UTC+3:00

Tarasovskaya (Russian: Тарасовская) is a rural locality (a village) in Yavengskoye Rural Settlement, Vozhegodsky District, Vologda Oblast, Russia. The population was 1 as of 2002.

== Geography ==
The distance to Vozhega is 41 km, to Baza is 26 km. Vasilyevskaya, Maleyevskaya, Ivanovskaya are the nearest rural localities.
