= Nadporozhye =

Nadporozhye Надпорожье
- Village
- Location within Vologda Oblast Location within Russia
- Coordinates: 60°26′N 40°01′E
- Country: Russia
- Region: Vologda Oblast
- District: Vozhegodsky District
- Time zone: UTC+3:00

Nadporozhye (Russian: Надпорожье) is a rural locality (a village) in Vozhegodskoye Urban Settlement, Vozhegodsky District, Vologda Oblast, Russia. The population was 1 as of 2002.

== Geography ==
Nadporozhye is located 12 km southwest of Vozhega (the district's administrative centre) by road. Tupitsyno is the nearest rural locality.
