= Nefedovskaya, Yavengskoye Rural Settlement, Vozhegodsky District, Vologda Oblast =

Nefedovskaya Нефедовская
- Village
- Location within Vologda Oblast Location within Russia
- Coordinates: 60°35′N 40°18′E
- Country: Russia
- Region: Vologda Oblast
- District: Vozhegodsky District
- Time zone: UTC+3:00

Nefedovskaya (Russian: Нефедовская) is a rural locality (a village) in Yavengskoye Rural Settlement, Vozhegodsky District, Vologda Oblast, Russia. The population was 16 as of 2002.

== Geography ==
The distance to Vozhega is 27.9 km, to Baza is 8 km. Belavinskaya, Khodinskaya, Mikhaylovskaya, Panteleyevskaya, Repnyakovskaya, Lupachikha, Karpovskaya are the nearest rural localities.
