= Maleyevskaya =

Maleyevskaya Малеевская
- Village
- Location within Vologda Oblast Location within Russia
- Coordinates: 60°32′N 40°37′E
- Country: Russia
- Region: Vologda Oblast
- District: Vozhegodsky District
- Time zone: UTC+3:00

Maleyevskaya (Russian: Малеевская) is a rural locality (a village) in Yavengskoye Rural Settlement, Vozhegodsky District, Vologda Oblast, Russia. The population was 14 as of 2002.

== Geography ==
Maleyevskaya is located 37 km northeast of Vozhega (the district's administrative centre) by road. Tarasovskaya is the nearest rural locality.
