= Yelenskaya =

Yelenskaya Еленская
- Village
- Location within Vologda Oblast Location within Russia
- Coordinates: 60°24′N 39°25′E
- Country: Russia
- Region: Vologda Oblast
- District: Vozhegodsky District
- Time zone: UTC+3:00

Yelenskaya (Russian: Еленская) is a rural locality (a village) in Beketovskoye Rural Settlement, Vozhegodsky District, Vologda Oblast, Russia. The population was 2 as of 2002.

== Geography ==
The distance to Vozhega is 65 km, to Beketovskaya is 10 km. Rakishevo, Mitrofanovo, Syrnevo, Vrazhnaya, Konechnaya, Pankovo are the nearest rural localities.
