= Ogarkovskaya =

Ogarkovskaya Огарковская
- Village
- Location within Vologda Oblast Location within Russia
- Coordinates: 60°33′N 39°47′E
- Country: Russia
- Region: Vologda Oblast
- District: Vozhegodsky District
- Time zone: UTC+3:00

Ogarkovskaya (Russian: Огарковская) is a rural locality (a village) in Tiginskoye Rural Settlement, Vozhegodsky District, Vologda Oblast, Russia. The population was 74 as of 2002.

== Geography ==
Ogarkovskaya is located 30 km northwest of Vozhega (the district's administrative centre) by road. Bukhara is the nearest rural locality.
