= Salnik, Vologda Oblast =

Salnik Сальник
- Village
- Location within Vologda Oblast Location within Russia
- Coordinates: 60°24′N 39°22′E
- Country: Russia
- Region: Vologda Oblast
- District: Vozhegodsky District
- Time zone: UTC+3:00

Salnik (Russian: Сальник) is a rural locality (a village) in Beketovskoye Rural Settlement, Vozhegodsky District, Vologda Oblast, Russia. The population was 3 as of 2002.

== Geography ==
Salnik is located 65 km west of Vozhega (the district's administrative centre) by road. Kozlovo is the nearest rural locality.
