= Kladovka =

Kladovka Кладовка
- Village
- Location within Vologda Oblast Location within Russia
- Coordinates: 60°25′N 39°45′E
- Country: Russia
- Region: Vologda Oblast
- District: Vozhegodsky District
- Time zone: UTC+3:00

Kladovka (Russian: Кладовка) is a rural locality (a village) in Tiginskoye Rural Settlement, Vozhegodsky District, Vologda Oblast, Russia. The population was 3 as of 2002.

== Geography ==
Kladovka is located 30 km southwest of Vozhega (the district's administrative centre) by road. Bilskaya is the nearest rural locality.
