= Timoshinskaya, Yuchkinskoye Rural Settlement, Vozhegodsky District, Vologda Oblast =

Timoshinskaya Тимошинская
- Village
- Location within Vologda Oblast Location within Russia
- Coordinates: 60°21′N 40°53′E
- Country: Russia
- Region: Vologda Oblast
- District: Vozhegodsky District
- Time zone: UTC+3:00

Timoshinskaya (Russian: Тимошинская) is a rural locality (a village) in Mityukovskoye Rural Settlement, Vozhegodsky District, Vologda Oblast, Russia. The population was 1 as of 2002.

== Geography ==
The distance to Vozhega is 71 km, to Sosnovitsa is 3 km. Popovka, Vasilyevskaya, Kostyuninskaya are the nearest rural localities.
