= Panteleyevskaya =

Panteleyevskaya Пантелеевская
- Village
- Location within Vologda Oblast Location within Russia
- Coordinates: 60°36′N 40°18′E
- Country: Russia
- Region: Vologda Oblast
- District: Vozhegodsky District
- Time zone: UTC+3:00

Panteleyevskaya (Russian: Пантелеевская) is a rural locality (a village) in Yavengskoye Rural Settlement, Vozhegodsky District, Vologda Oblast, Russia. The population was 26 as of 2002.

== Geography ==
Panteleyevskaya is located 27 km northeast of Vozhega (the district's administrative centre) by road. Ulitinskaya is the nearest rural locality.
