= Soroginskaya =

Soroginskaya Сорогинская
- Village
- Location within Vologda Oblast Location within Russia
- Coordinates: 60°36′N 40°10′E
- Country: Russia
- Region: Vologda Oblast
- District: Vozhegodsky District
- Time zone: UTC+3:00

Soroginskaya (Russian: Сорогинская) is a rural locality (a village) in Yavengskoye Rural Settlement, Vozhegodsky District, Vologda Oblast, Russia. The population was 64 as of 2002.

== Geography ==
Soroginskaya is located 20 km north of Vozhega (the district's administrative centre) by road. Proletarsky is the nearest rural locality.
