= Ignatovskaya =

Ignatovskaya Игнатовская
- Village
- Location within Vologda Oblast Location within Russia
- Coordinates: 60°28′N 41°01′E
- Country: Russia
- Region: Vologda Oblast
- District: Vozhegodsky District
- Time zone: UTC+3:00

Ignatovskaya (Russian: Игнатовская) is a rural locality (a village) in Nizhneslobodskoye Rural Settlement, Vozhegodsky District, Vologda Oblast, Russia. The population was 24 as of 2002.

== Geography ==
Ignatovskaya is located 51 km east of Vozhega (the district's administrative centre) by road. Zasukhonskaya is the nearest rural locality.
