= Khmelevskaya =

Khmelevskaya Хмелевская
- Village
- Location within Vologda Oblast Location within Russia
- Coordinates: 60°26′N 40°55′E
- Country: Russia
- Region: Vologda Oblast
- District: Vozhegodsky District
- Time zone: UTC+3:00

Khmelevskaya (Russian: Хмелевская) is a rural locality (a village) in Mityukovskoye Rural Settlement, Vozhegodsky District, Vologda Oblast, Russia. The population was 26 as of 2002.

== Geography ==
Khmelevskaya is located 70 km east of Vozhega (the district's administrative centre) by road. Kostyuninskaya is the nearest rural locality.
