= Abaturikha =

Abaturikha Абатуриха
- Village
- Location within Vologda Oblast Location within Russia
- Coordinates: 60°25′N 40°05′E
- Country: Russia
- Region: Vologda Oblast
- District: Vozhegodsky District
- Time zone: [[UTC+3:00]]

Abaturikha (Russian: Абатуриха) is a rural locality (a village) in Vozhegodskoye Rural Settlement of Vozhegodsky District, Vologda Oblast, Russia. The population was 1 as of 2002.

== Geography ==
Abaturikha is located 10 km southwest of Vozhega (the district's administrative centre) by road. Popovka is the nearest rural locality.
