= Antsiferovskaya, Yavengskoye Rural Settlement, Vozhegodsky District, Vologda Oblast =

Antsiferovskaya Анциферовская
- Village
- Location within Vologda Oblast Location within Russia
- Coordinates: 60°36′N 40°35′E
- Country: Russia
- Region: Vologda Oblast
- District: Vozhegodsky District
- Time zone: UTC+3:00

Antsiferovskaya (Russian: Анциферовская) is a rural locality (a village) in Yavengskoye Rural Settlement, Vozhegodsky District, Vologda Oblast, Russia. The population was 39 as of 2002.

== Geography ==
The distance to Vozhega is 37 km, to Baza is 24 km. Olekhovskaya, Dorkovskaya, Gora, Fedyayevskaya are the nearest rural localities.
