= Nikitino, Vozhegodsky District, Vologda Oblast =

Nikitino Никитино
- Village
- Location within Vologda Oblast Location within Russia
- Coordinates: 60°22′N 39°16′E
- Country: Russia
- Region: Vologda Oblast
- District: Vozhegodsky District
- Time zone: UTC+3:00

Nikitino (Russian: Никитино) is a rural locality (a village) that is found in the Beketovskoye Rural Settlement of Vozhegodsky District, in Vologda Oblast, Russia. The population was 4 as of 2002.

== Geography ==
Nikitino is located 72 km southwest of Vozhega (the district's administrative centre) by road. Popovka Kalikinskaya is the nearest rural locality.
