= Kurshiyevskaya =

Kurshiyevskaya Куршиевская
- Village
- Location within Vologda Oblast Location within Russia
- Coordinates: 60°34′N 39°40′E
- Country: Russia
- Region: Vologda Oblast
- District: Vozhegodsky District
- Time zone: UTC+3:00

Kurshiyevskaya (Russian: Куршиевская) is a rural locality (a village) in Tiginskoye Rural Settlement, Vozhegodsky District, Vologda Oblast, Russia. The population was 70 as of 2002.

== Geography ==
Kurshiyevskaya is located 39 km northwest of Vozhega (the district's administrative centre) by road. Ogibalovo is the nearest rural locality.
