= Stepanikha, Tiginskoye Rural Settlement, Vozhegodsky District, Vologda Oblast =

Stepanikha Степаниха
- Village
- Location within Vologda Oblast Location within Russia
- Coordinates: 60°28′N 39°52′E
- Country: Russia
- Region: Vologda Oblast
- District: Vozhegodsky District
- Time zone: UTC+3:00

Stepanikha (Russian: Степаниха) is a rural locality (a village) in Tiginskoye Rural Settlement, Vozhegodsky District, Vologda Oblast, Russia. The population was 67 as of 2002.

== Geography ==
The distance to Vozhega is 21 km, to Gridino is 1 km. Shchegolikha, Levinskaya, Malaya, Gridino, Pesok, Nikitinskaya, Leshchevka are the nearest rural localities.
