= Popovka, Yukchinskoye Rural Settlement, Vozhegodsky District, Vologda Oblast =

Popovka Поповка
- Village
- Location within Vologda Oblast Location within Russia
- Coordinates: 60°21′N 40°51′E
- Country: Russia
- Region: Vologda Oblast
- District: Vozhegodsky District
- Time zone: UTC+3:00

Popovka (Russian: Поповка) is a rural locality (a village) in Vozhegodsky District, Vologda Oblast, Russia. The population was 14 as of 2002.

== Geography ==
The distance to Vozhega is 69 km, to Sosnovitsa is 1 km. Grishinskaya, Sosnovitsa, Vasilyevskaya are the nearest rural localities.
