= Kropufinskaya =

Kropufinskaya Кропуфинская
- Village
- Location within Vologda Oblast Location within Russia
- Coordinates: 60°21′N 39°11′E
- Country: Russia
- Region: Vologda Oblast
- District: Vozhegodsky District
- Time zone: UTC+3:00

Kropufinskaya (Russian: Кропуфинская) is a rural locality (a village) in Beketovskoye Rural Settlement, Vozhegodsky District, Vologda Oblast, Russia. The population was 38 as of 2002.

== Geography ==
Kropufinskaya is located 76 km southwest of Vozhega (the district's administrative centre) by road. Nikulskaya is the nearest rural locality.
