= Dorovikha =

Dorovikha Доровиха
- Village
- Location within Vologda Oblast Location within Russia
- Coordinates: 60°27′N 41°16′E
- Country: Russia
- Region: Vologda Oblast
- District: Vozhegodsky District
- Time zone: UTC+3:00

Dorovikha (Russian: Доровиха) is a rural locality (a village) in Mishutinskoye Rural Settlement, Vozhegodsky District, Vologda Oblast, Russia. The population was 5 as of 2002.

== Geography ==
Dorovikha is located 67 km east of Vozhega (the district's administrative centre) by road. Dubrovinskaya is the nearest rural locality.
