= Grishinskaya =

Grishinskaya Гришинская
- Village
- Location within Vologda Oblast Location within Russia
- Coordinates: 60°21′N 40°50′E
- Country: Russia
- Region: Vologda Oblast
- District: Vozhegodsky District
- Time zone: UTC+3:00

Grishinskaya (Russian: Гришинская) is a rural locality (a village) in Mityukovskoye Rural Settlement, Vozhegodsky District, Vologda Oblast, Russia. The population was 59 as of 2002.

== Geography ==
Grishinskaya is approximately 916 km away by road from Moscow and additionally located 59 km (37 mi) southeast of Vozhega (the district's administrative center) Sosnovitsa is the nearest rural locality. It is southwest of Lake Ozero Uzhinskoye.
