= Gubinskaya, Vologda Oblast =

Gubinskaya Губинская
- Village
- Location within Vologda Oblast Location within Russia
- Coordinates: 60°25′N 39°43′E
- Country: Russia
- Region: Vologda Oblast
- District: Vozhegodsky District
- Time zone: UTC+3:00

Gubinskaya (Russian: Губинская) is a rural locality (a village) in Tiginskoye Rural Settlement, Vozhegodsky District, Vologda Oblast, Russia. The population was 3 as of 2002.

== Geography ==
Gubinskaya is located 31 km southwest of Vozhega (the district's administrative centre) by road. Shistikha is the nearest rural locality.
