= Bykovskaya, Yuchkinskoye Rural Settlement, Vozhegodsky District, Vologda Oblast =

Bykovskaya Быковская
- Village
- Location within Vologda Oblast Location within Russia
- Coordinates: 60°21′N 40°48′E
- Country: Russia
- Region: Vologda Oblast
- District: Vozhegodsky District
- Time zone: UTC+3:00

Bykovskaya (Russian: Быковская) is a rural locality (a village) in Mityukovskoye Rural Settlement, Vozhegodsky District, Vologda Oblast, Russia. The population was 3 as of 2002.

== Geography ==
The distance to Vozhega is 69 km, to Sosnovitsa is 1 km. Sigovskaya, Grishinskaya, Sosnovitsa are the nearest rural localities.
