= Bykovskaya, Yavengskoye Rural Settlement, Vozhegodsky District, Vologda Oblast =

Bykovskaya Быковская
- Village
- Location within Vologda Oblast Location within Russia
- Coordinates: 60°32′N 40°17′E
- Country: Russia
- Region: Vologda Oblast
- District: Vozhegodsky District
- Time zone: UTC+3:00

Bykovskaya (Russian: Быковская) is a rural locality (a village) in Yavengskoye Rural Settlement, Vozhegodsky District, Vologda Oblast, Russia. The population was 20 as of 2002.

== Geography ==
The distance to Vozhega is 24 km, to Baza is 10 km. Fominskaya, Savinskaya, Pestinskaya are the nearest rural localities.
