= Maloye Ramenye =

Maloye Ramenye Малое Раменье
- Village
- Location within Vologda Oblast Location within Russia
- Coordinates: 60°21′N 39°21′E
- Country: Russia
- Region: Vologda Oblast
- District: Vozhegodsky District
- Time zone: UTC+3:00

Maloye Ramenye (Russian: Малое Раменье) is a rural locality (a village) in Beketovskoye Rural Settlement, Vozhegodsky District, Vologda Oblast, Russia. The population was 13 as of 2002.

== Geography ==
Maloye Ramenye is located 76 km southwest of Vozhega (the district's administrative centre) by road. Chichirino is the nearest rural locality.
