= Yeskinskaya =

Yeskinskaya Ескинская
- Village
- Location within Vologda Oblast Location within Russia
- Coordinates: 60°30′N 40°55′E
- Country: Russia
- Region: Vologda Oblast
- District: Vozhegodsky District
- Time zone: UTC+3:00

Yeskinskaya (Russian: Ескинская) is a rural locality (a village) in Nizhneslobodskoye Rural Settlement, Vozhegodsky District, Vologda Oblast, Russia. The population was 2 as of 2002.

== Geography ==
Yeskinskaya is located 47 km east of Vozhega (the district's administrative centre) by road. Pavlovskaya is the nearest rural locality.
