= Kholdynka =

Kholdynka Холдынка
- Village
- Location within Vologda Oblast Location within Russia
- Coordinates: 60°29′N 40°58′E
- Country: Russia
- Region: Vologda Oblast
- District: Vozhegodsky District
- Time zone: UTC+3:00

Kholdynka (Russian: Холдынка) is a rural locality (a village) in Nizhneslobodskoye Rural Settlement, Vozhegodsky District, Vologda Oblast, Russia. The population was 55 as of 2002.

== Geography ==
Kholdynka is located 48 km east of Vozhega (the district's administrative centre) by road. Fedyuninskaya is the nearest rural locality.
