= Mikheyevskaya =

Mikheyevskaya Михеевская
- Village
- Location within Vologda Oblast Location within Russia
- Coordinates: 60°39′N 40°07′E
- Country: Russia
- Region: Vologda Oblast
- District: Vozhegodsky District
- Time zone: UTC+3:00

Mikheyevskaya (Russian: Михеевская) is a rural locality (a village) in Yavengskoye Rural Settlement, Vozhegodsky District, Vologda Oblast, Russia. The population was 10 as of 2002.

== Geography ==
Mikheyevskaya is located 23 km north of Vozhega (the district's administrative centre) by road. Fevralsky is the nearest rural locality.
