= Yakovlevo, Vozhegodsky District, Vologda Oblast =

Yakovlevo Яковлево
- Village
- Location within Vologda Oblast Location within Russia
- Coordinates: 60°23′N 39°21′E
- Country: Russia
- Region: Vologda Oblast
- District: Vozhegodsky District
- Time zone: UTC+3:00

Yakovlevo (Russian: Яковлево) is a rural locality (a village) in Beketovskoye Rural Settlement, Vozhegodsky District, Vologda Oblast, Russia. The population was 2 as of 2002.

== Geography ==
Yakovlevo is located 65 km west of Vozhega (the district's administrative centre) by road. Salnik is the nearest rural locality.
