= Drovdil =

Drovdil Дровдиль
- Village
- Location within Vologda Oblast Location within Russia
- Coordinates: 60°29′N 39°52′E
- Country: Russia
- Region: Vologda Oblast
- District: Vozhegodsky District
- Time zone: UTC+3:00

Drovdil (Russian: Дровдиль) is a rural locality (a village) in Tiginskoye Rural Settlement, Vozhegodsky District, Vologda Oblast, Russia. The population was 21 as of 2002.

== Geography ==
Drovdil is located 22 km west of Vozhega (the district's administrative centre) by road. Gridino is the nearest rural locality.
