= Bucherovskaya =

Bucherovskaya Бучеровская
- Village
- Location within Vologda Oblast Location within Russia
- Coordinates: 60°36′N 40°32′E
- Country: Russia
- Region: Vologda Oblast
- District: Vozhegodsky District
- Time zone: UTC+3:00

Bucherovskaya (Russian: Бучеровская) is a rural locality (a village) in Yavengskoye Rural Settlement, Vozhegodsky District, Vologda Oblast, Russia. The population was 23 as of 2002.

== Geography ==
Bucherovskaya is located 31 km northeast of Vozhega (the district's administrative centre) by road. Semenovskaya is the nearest rural locality.
