= Podolnaya =

Podolnaya Подольная
- Village
- Location within Vologda Oblast Location within Russia
- Coordinates: 60°25′N 39°58′E
- Country: Russia
- Region: Vologda Oblast
- District: Vozhegodsky District
- Time zone: UTC+3:00

Podolnaya (Russian: Подольная) is a rural locality (a village) in Vozhegodskoye Urban Settlement, Vozhegodsky District, Vologda Oblast, Russia. The population was 7 as of 2002.

== Geography ==
Podolnaya is located 16 km southwest of Vozhega (the district's administrative centre) by road. Samoylovskaya is the nearest rural locality.
