= Fomishchevo =

Fomishchevo Фомищево
- Village
- Location within Vologda Oblast Location within Russia
- Coordinates: 60°32′N 40°14′E
- Country: Russia
- Region: Vologda Oblast
- District: Vozhegodsky District
- Time zone: UTC+3:00

Fomishchevo (Russian: Фомищево) is a rural locality (a village) in Yavengskoye Rural Settlement, Vozhegodsky District, Vologda Oblast, Russia. The population was 1 as of 2002.

== Geography ==
Fomishchevo is located 13 km north of Vozhega (the district's administrative centre) by road. Kostyuninskaya is the nearest rural locality.
