= Levinskaya, Nizhneslobodskoye Rural Settlement, Vozhegodsky District, Vologda Oblast =

Levinskaya Левинская
- Village
- Location within Vologda Oblast Location within Russia
- Coordinates: 60°30′N 41°05′E
- Country: Russia
- Region: Vologda Oblast
- District: Vozhegodsky District
- Time zone: UTC+3:00

Levinskaya (Russian: Левинская) is a rural locality (a village) in Nizhneslobodskoye Rural Settlement, Vozhegodsky District, Vologda Oblast, Russia. The population was 1 as of 2002.

== Geography ==
The distance to Vozhega is 59 km, to Derevenka is 10 km. Blinovskaya, Nekrasovskaya, Lukyanovskaya are the nearest rural localities.
