= Leshchevka =

Leshchevka Лещевка
- Village
- Location within Vologda Oblast Location within Russia
- Coordinates: 60°28′N 39°53′E
- Country: Russia
- Region: Vologda Oblast
- District: Vozhegodsky District
- Time zone: UTC+3:00

Leshchevka (Russian: Лещевка) is a rural locality (a village) in Tiginskoye Rural Settlement, Vozhegodsky District, Vologda Oblast, Russia. The population was 39 as of 2002.

== Geography ==
Leshchevka is located 18 km west of Vozhega (the district's administrative centre) by road. Nikitinskaya is the nearest rural locality.
