= Pogorelovo, Vozhegodsky District, Vologda Oblast =

Pogorelovo Погорелово
- Village
- Location within Vologda Oblast Location within Russia
- Coordinates: 60°33′N 40°06′E
- Country: Russia
- Region: Vologda Oblast
- District: Vozhegodsky District
- Time zone: UTC+3:00

Pogorelovo (Russian: Погорелово) is a rural locality (a village) in Yavengskoye Rural Settlement, Vozhegodsky District, Vologda Oblast, Russia. The population was 4 as of 2002.

== Geography ==
Pogorelovo is located 13 km northwest of Vozhega (the district's administrative centre) by road. Shchekotovskaya is the nearest rural locality.
