= Boyarskaya, Beketovskoye Rural Settlement, Vozhegodsky District, Vologda Oblast =

Boyarskaya Боярская
- Village
- Location within Vologda Oblast Location within Russia
- Coordinates: 60°30′N 39°23′E
- Country: Russia
- Region: Vologda Oblast
- District: Vozhegodsky District
- Time zone: UTC+3:00

Boyarskaya (Russian: Боярская) is a rural locality (a village) in Beketovskoye Rural Settlement, Vozhegodsky District, Vologda Oblast, Russia. The population was 45 as of 2002.

== Geography ==
The distance to Vozhega is 52 km, to Beketovskaya is 0.5 km. Beketovskaya, Gashkovo, Bor are the nearest rural localities.
