= Zasukhonskaya =

Zasukhonskaya Засухонская
- Village
- Location within Vologda Oblast Location within Russia
- Coordinates: 60°28′N 41°00′E
- Country: Russia
- Region: Vologda Oblast
- District: Vozhegodsky District
- Time zone: UTC+3:00

Zasukhonskaya (Russian: Засухонская) is a rural locality (a village) in Nizhneslobodskoye Rural Settlement, Vozhegodsky District, Vologda Oblast, Russia. The population was 30 as of 2002.

== Geography ==
Zasukhonskaya is located 49 km east of Vozhega (the district's administrative centre) by road. Okulovskaya is the nearest rural locality.
