= Nikulskaya =

Nikulskaya Никульская
- Village
- Location within Vologda Oblast Location within Russia
- Coordinates: 60°21′N 39°11′E
- Country: Russia
- Region: Vologda Oblast
- District: Vozhegodsky District
- Time zone: UTC+3:00

Nikulskaya (Russian: Никульская) is a rural locality (a village) in Beketovskoye Rural Settlement, Vozhegodsky District, Vologda Oblast, Russia. The population was 17 as of 2002.

== Geography ==
Nikulskaya is located 76 km (47.2 mi) west of Vozhega (the district's administrative centre) by road. Voskresenskoye is the nearest rural locality.
