= Gorka, Beketovskoye Rural Settlement, Vozhegodsky District, Vologda Oblast =

Gorka Горка
- Village
- Location within Vologda Oblast Location within Russia
- Coordinates: 60°30′N 39°26′E
- Country: Russia
- Region: Vologda Oblast
- District: Vozhegodsky District
- Time zone: UTC+3:00

Gorka (Russian: Горка) is a rural locality (a village) in Beketovskoye Rural Settlement, Vozhegodsky District, Vologda Oblast, Russia. The population was 14 as of 2002.

== Geography ==
The distance to Vozhega is 49 km, to Beketovskaya is 3 km. Gashkovo, Bor, Tarasovskaya, Porokhino are the nearest rural localities.
