= Zabereznik =

Zabereznik Заберезник
- Village
- Location within Vologda Oblast Location within Russia
- Coordinates: 60°39′N 39°37′E
- Country: Russia
- Region: Vologda Oblast
- District: Vozhegodsky District
- Time zone: UTC+3:00

Zabereznik (Russian: Заберезник) is a rural locality (a village) in Tiginskoye Rural Settlement, Vozhegodsky District, Vologda Oblast, Russia. The population was 39 as of 2002.

== Geography ==
Zabereznik is located 50 km northwest of Vozhega (the district's administrative centre) by road. Pesok is the nearest rural locality.
