= Kuklinskaya =

Kuklinskaya Куклинская
- Village
- Location within Vologda Oblast Location within Russia
- Coordinates: 60°31′N 39°34′E
- Country: Russia
- Region: Vologda Oblast
- District: Vozhegodsky District
- Time zone: UTC+3:00

Kuklinskaya (Russian: Куклинская) is a rural locality (a village) in Beketovskoye Rural Settlement, Vozhegodsky District, Vologda Oblast, Russia. The population was 15 as of 2002.

== Geography ==
Kuklinskaya is located 48 km northwest of Vozhega (the district's administrative centre) by road. Osiyevskaya is the nearest rural locality.
