= Galuninskaya =

Galuninskaya Галунинская
- Village
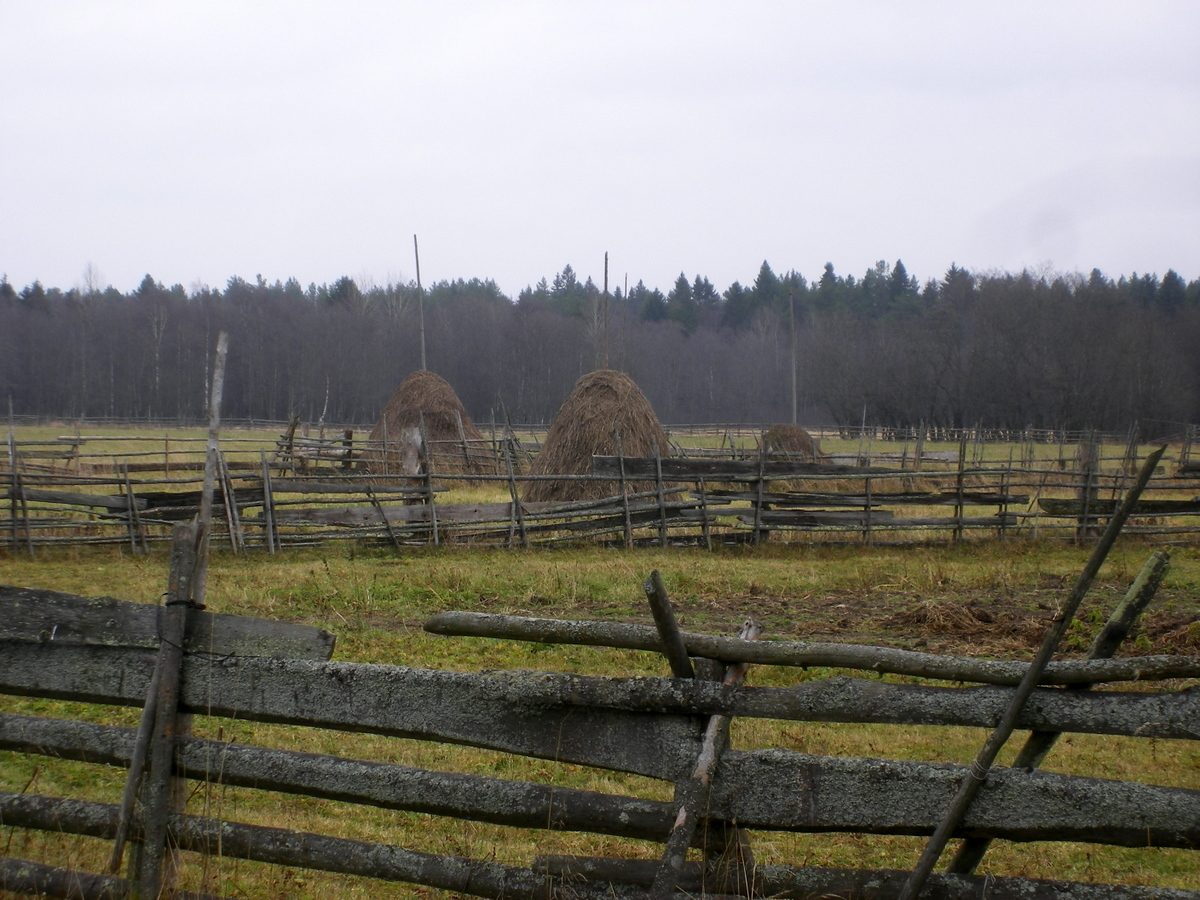
- Galuninskaya

- Location within Vologda Oblast Location within Russia
- Coordinates: 60°20′N 40°47′E
- Country: Russia
- Region: Vologda Oblast
- District: Vozhegodsky District
- Time zone: UTC+3:00

Galuninskaya (Russian: Галунинская) is a rural locality (a village) in Mityukovskoye Rural Settlement, Vozhegodsky District, Vologda Oblast, Russia. The population was 22 as of 2002.

== Geography ==
Galuninskaya is located 65 km southeast of Vozhega (the district's administrative centre) by road. Galuninskaya is the nearest rural locality.
