= Munskaya =

Munskaya Мунская
- Village
- Location within Vologda Oblast Location within Russia
- Coordinates: 60°23′N 39°23′E
- Country: Russia
- Region: Vologda Oblast
- District: Vozhegodsky District
- Time zone: UTC+3:00

Munskaya (Russian: Мунская) is a rural locality (a village) in Vozhegodsky District, Vologda Oblast, Russia. The population was 2 as of 2002.

== Geography ==
Munskaya is located 67 km southwest of Vozhega (the district's administrative centre) by road. Myshino is the nearest rural locality.
