= Perepechikha =

Perepechikha Перепечиха
- Village
- Location within Vologda Oblast Location within Russia
- Coordinates: 60°32′N 40°24′E
- Country: Russia
- Region: Vologda Oblast
- District: Vozhegodsky District
- Time zone: UTC+3:00

Perepechikha (Russian: Перепечиха) is a rural locality (a village) in Yavengskoye Rural Settlement, Vozhegodsky District, Vologda Oblast, Russia. The population was 17 as of 2002.

== Geography ==
Perepechikha is located 18 km northeast of Vozhega (the district's administrative centre) by road. Maryinskaya is the nearest rural locality.
