= Anisimovskaya, Beketovskoye Rural Settlement, Vozhegodsky District, Vologda Oblast =

Anisimovskaya Анисимовская
- Village
- Location within Vologda Oblast Location within Russia
- Coordinates: 60°23′N 39°15′E
- Country: Russia
- Region: Vologda Oblast
- District: Vozhegodsky District
- Time zone: UTC+3:00

Anisimovskaya (Russian: Анисимовская) is a rural locality (a village) in Beketovskoye Rural Settlement, Vozhegodsky District, Vologda Oblast, Russia. The population was 38 as of 2002.

== Geography ==
The distance to Vozhega is 69 km, to Beketovskaya is 15 km. Nikolskaya, Kalikinsky Bereznik, Ivankovo, Borisovo are the nearest rural localities.
