= Beketovskaya =

Beketovskaya Бекетовская
- Village
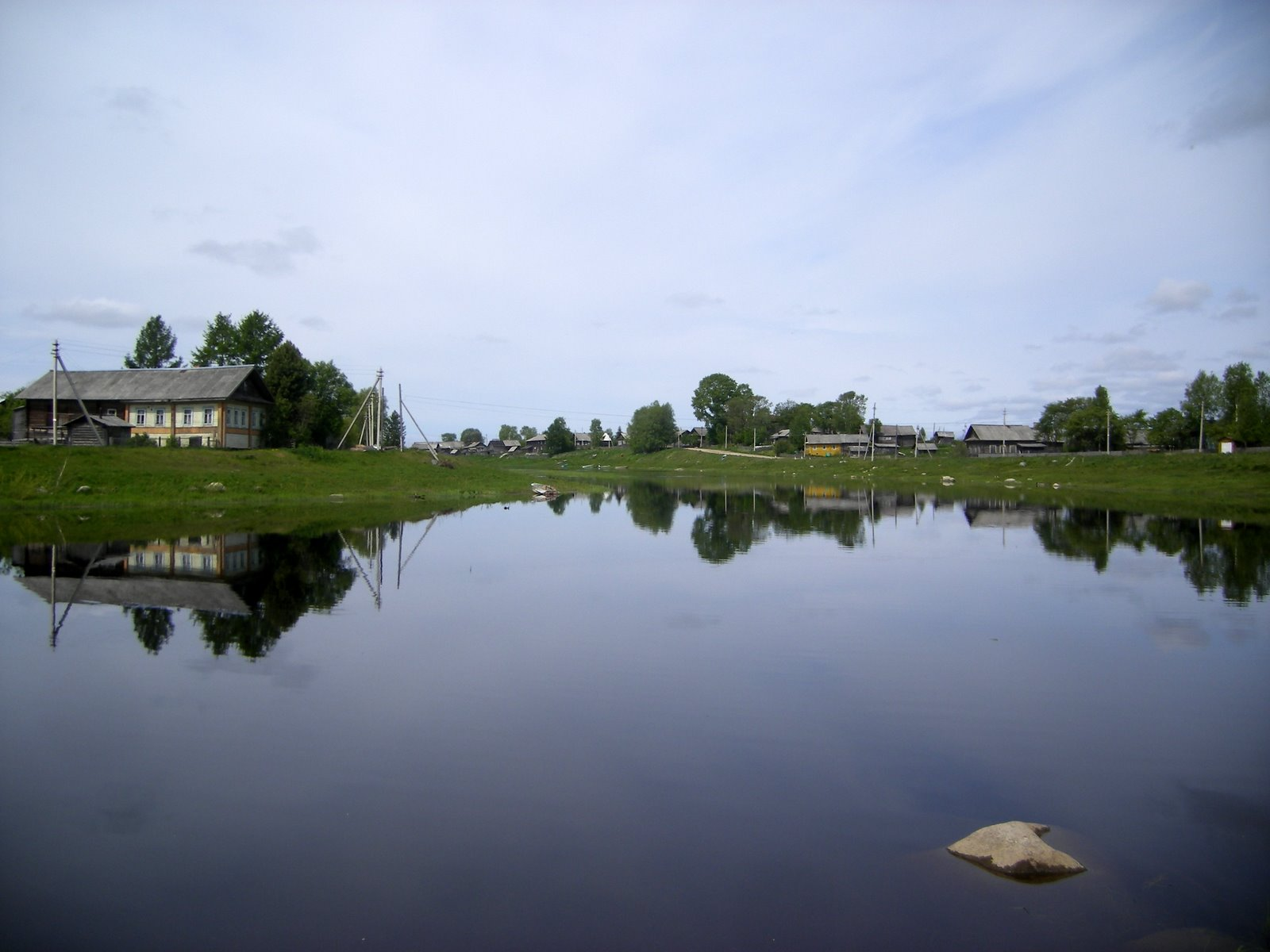
- Beketovskaya

- Location within Vologda Oblast Location within Russia
- Coordinates: 60°30′N 39°23′E
- Country: Russia
- Region: Vologda Oblast
- District: Vozhegodsky District
- Time zone: UTC+3:00

Beketovskaya (Russian: Бекетовская) is a rural locality (a village) and the administrative center of Beketovskoye Rural Settlement, Vozhegodsky District, Vologda Oblast, Russia. The population was 393 as of 2002.

== Geography ==
Beketovskaya is located 54 km west of Vozhega (the district's administrative centre) by road. Boyarskaya is the nearest rural locality.
