= Shchegolikha =

Shchegolikha Щеголиха
- Village
- Location within Vologda Oblast Location within Russia
- Coordinates: 60°28′N 39°50′E
- Country: Russia
- Region: Vologda Oblast
- District: Vozhegodsky District
- Time zone: UTC+3:00

Shchegolikha (Russian: Щеголиха) is a rural locality (a village) in Tiginskoye Rural Settlement, Vozhegodsky District, Vologda Oblast, Russia. The population was 32 as of 2002.

== Geography ==
Shchegolikha is located 21 km west of Vozhega (the district's administrative centre) by road. Malaya is the nearest rural locality.
