= Olekhovskaya =

Olekhovskaya Олеховская
- Village
- Location within Vologda Oblast Location within Russia
- Coordinates: 60°35′N 40°34′E
- Country: Russia
- Region: Vologda Oblast
- District: Vozhegodsky District
- Time zone: UTC+3:00

Olekhovskaya (Russian: Олеховская) is a rural locality (a village) in Yavengskoye Rural Settlement, Vozhegodsky District, Vologda Oblast, Russia. The population was 38 as of 2002.

== Geography ==
The distance to Vozhega is 32 km, to Baza is 23 km. Bucherovskaya, Semyonovskaya, Korotyginskaya, Dorkovskaya, Antsiferovskaya, Fedyayevskaya are the nearest rural localities.
