= Ivoninskaya, Vozhegodsky District, Vologda Oblast =

Ivoninskaya Ивонинская
- Village
- Location within Vologda Oblast Location within Russia
- Coordinates: 60°26′N 41°13′E
- Country: Russia
- Region: Vologda Oblast
- District: Vozhegodsky District
- Time zone: UTC+3:00

Ivoninskaya (Russian: Ивонинская) is a rural locality (a village) in Mishutinskoye Rural Settlement, Vozhegodsky District, Vologda Oblast, Russia. The population was 3 as of 2002.

== Geography ==
Ivoninskaya is located 69 km east of Vozhega (the district's administrative centre) by road. Checheninskaya is the nearest rural locality.
