= Dorkovskaya =

Dorkovskaya Дорковская
- Village
- Location within Vologda Oblast Location within Russia
- Coordinates: 60°36′N 40°34′E
- Country: Russia
- Region: Vologda Oblast
- District: Vozhegodsky District
- Time zone: UTC+3:00

Dorkovskaya (Russian: Дорковская) is a rural locality (a village) in Yavengskoye Rural Settlement, Vozhegodsky District, Vologda Oblast, Russia. The population was 4 as of 2002.

== Geography ==
Dorkovskaya is located 32 km northeast of Vozhega (the district's administrative centre) by road. Antsiferovskaya is the nearest rural locality.
