= Kutilovo, Vologda Oblast =

Kutilovo Кутилово
- Village
- Location within Vologda Oblast Location within Russia
- Coordinates: 60°18′N 39°09′E
- Country: Russia
- Region: Vologda Oblast
- District: Vozhegodsky District
- Time zone: UTC+3:00

Kutilovo (Russian: Кутилово) is a rural locality (a village) in Beketovskoye Rural Settlement, Vozhegodsky District, Vologda Oblast, Russia. The population was 3 as of 2002.

== Geography ==
Kutilovo is located 83 km southwest of Vozhega (the district's administrative centre) by road. Mytnik is the nearest rural locality.
