= Tigino =

Tigino Тигино
- Village
- Location within Vologda Oblast Location within Russia
- Coordinates: 60°20′N 39°11′E
- Country: Russia
- Region: Vologda Oblast
- District: Vozhegodsky District
- Time zone: UTC+3:00

Tigino (Russian: Тигино) is a rural locality (a village) in Beketovskoye Rural Settlement, Vozhegodsky District, Vologda Oblast, Russia. The population was 1 as of 2002.

== Geography ==
Tigino is located 80 km southwest of Vozhega (the district's administrative centre) by road. Mytnik is the nearest rural locality.
