= Bolshaya Nazarovskaya =

Bolshaya Nazarovskaya Большая Назаровская
- Village
- Location within Vologda Oblast Location within Russia
- Coordinates: 60°35′N 40°05′E
- Country: Russia
- Region: Vologda Oblast
- District: Vozhegodsky District
- Time zone: UTC+3:00

Bolshaya Nazarovskaya (Russian: Большая Назаровская) is a rural locality (a village) in Yavengskoye Rural Settlement, Vozhegodsky District, Vologda Oblast, Russia. The population was 6 in 2002.

== Geography ==
Bolshaya Nazarovskaya is located 17 km northwest of Vozhega (the district's administrative centre) by road. Okulovskaya is the nearest rural locality.
