= Manuilovskaya =

Manuilovskaya Мануиловская
- Village
- Location within Vologda Oblast Location within Russia
- Coordinates: 60°28′N 40°40′E
- Country: Russia
- Region: Vologda Oblast
- District: Vozhegodsky District
- Time zone: UTC+3:00

Manuilovskaya (Russian: Мануиловская) is a rural locality (a village) in Yuchkinskoye Rural Settlement, Vozhegodsky District, Vologda Oblast, Russia. The population was 1 as of 2002.

== Geography ==
Manuilovskaya is located 29 km east of Vozhega (the district's administrative centre) by road. Ivanovskaya is the nearest rural locality.
