= Popovka, Mishutinskoye Rural Settlement, Vozhegodsky District, Vologda Oblast =

Popovka Поповка
- Village
- Location within Vologda Oblast Location within Russia
- Coordinates: 60°27′N 41°11′E
- Country: Russia
- Region: Vologda Oblast
- District: Vozhegodsky District
- Time zone: UTC+3:00

Popovka (Russian: Поповка) is a rural locality (a village) in Mishutinskoye Rural Settlement, Vozhegodsky District, Vologda Oblast, Russia. The population was 8 as of 2002.

== Geography ==
The distance to Vozhega is 64.5 km, to Mishutinskaya is 1.5 km. Agafonovskaya, Checheninskaya, Ozhiginskaya, Mishutinskaya are the nearest rural localities.
