= Semyonovskaya, Yavengskoye Rural Settlement, Vozhegodsky District, Vologda Oblast =

Semyonovskaya Семёновская
- Village
- Location within Vologda Oblast Location within Russia
- Coordinates: 60°35′N 40°34′E
- Country: Russia
- Region: Vologda Oblast
- District: Vozhegodsky District
- Time zone: UTC+3:00

Semyonovskaya (Russian: Семёновская) is a rural locality (a village) in Yavengskoye Rural Settlement, Vozhegodsky District, Vologda Oblast, Russia. The population was 66 as of 2002.

== Geography ==
The distance to Vozhega is 32 km, to Baza is 22 km. Bucherovskaya, Korotyginskaya, Olekhovskaya, Dorkovskaya, Fedyayevskaya are the nearest rural localities.
