= Petrovo, Vozhegodsky District, Vologda Oblast =

Petrovo Петрово
- Village
- Location within Vologda Oblast Location within Russia
- Coordinates: 60°22′N 39°17′E
- Country: Russia
- Region: Vologda Oblast
- District: Vozhegodsky District
- Time zone: UTC+3:00

Petrovo (Russian: Петрово) is a rural locality (a village) in Beketovskoye Rural Settlement, Vozhegodsky District, Vologda Oblast, Russia. The population was 10 as of 2002.

== Geography ==
Petrovo is located 71 km southwest of Vozhega (the district's administrative centre) by road. Krapivino is the nearest rural locality.
