= Kuritsino =

Kuritsino Курицино
- Village
- Location within Vologda Oblast Location within Russia
- Coordinates: 60°21′N 39°11′E
- Country: Russia
- Region: Vologda Oblast
- District: Vozhegodsky District
- Time zone: UTC+3:00

Kuritsino (Russian: Курицино) is a rural locality (a village) in Beketovskoye Rural Settlement, Vozhegodsky District, Vologda Oblast, Russia. The population was 34 as of 2002.

== Geography ==
The distance to Vozhega is 80 km, to Beketovskaya is 1 km. Nikulskaya, Kropufinskaya, Pokrovskaya, Andreyevskaya, Voskresenskoye, Zuyevo, Konechnaya, Filatovskaya are the nearest rural localities.
