= Nefedovskaya =

Nefedovskaya Нефедовская
- Village
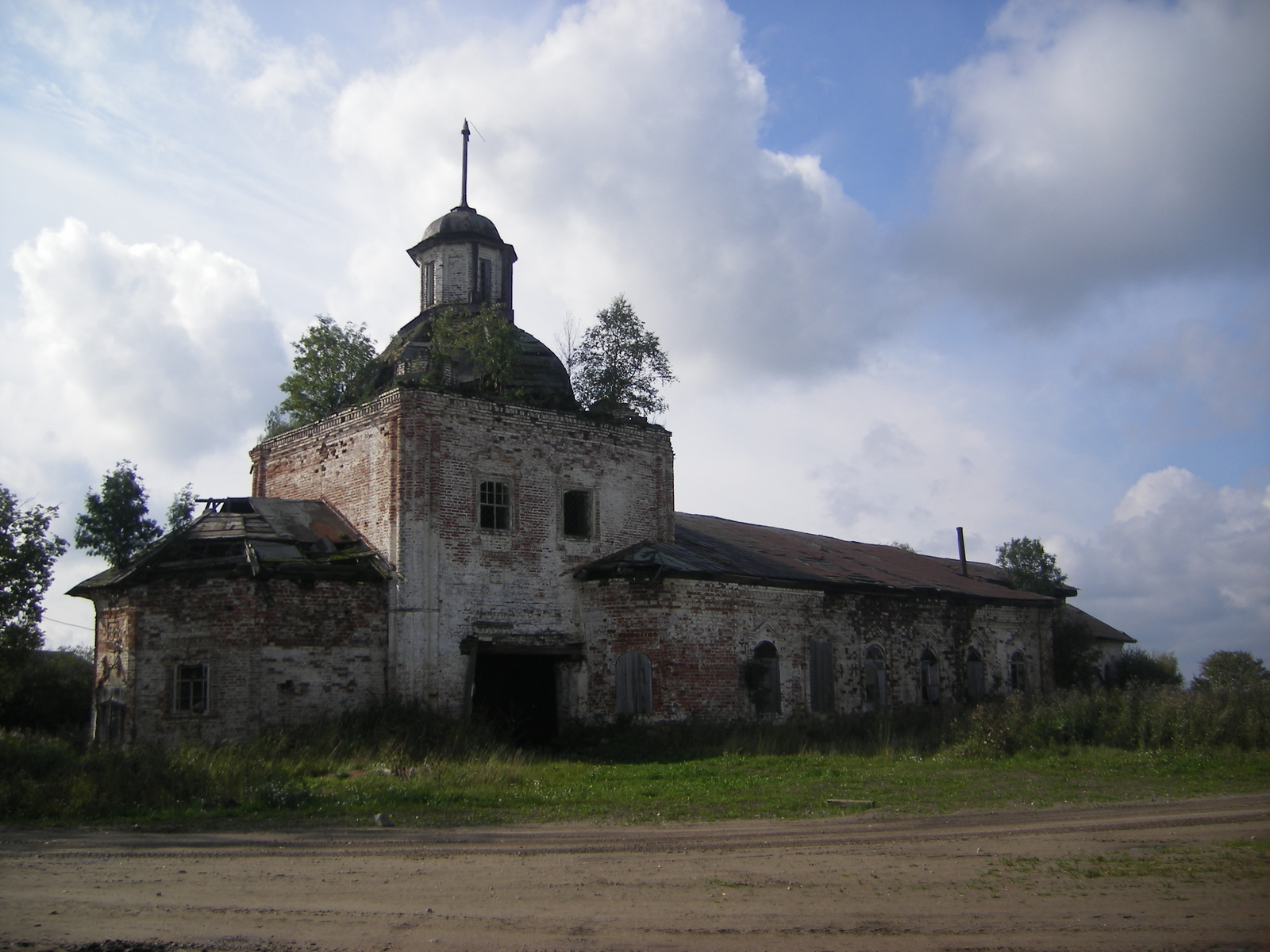

- Location within Vologda Oblast Location within Russia
- Coordinates: 60°34′N 39°47′E
- Country: Russia
- Region: Vologda Oblast
- District: Vozhegodsky District
- Time zone: UTC+3:00

Nefedovskaya (Russian: Нефедовская) is a rural locality (a village) in Tiginskoye Rural Settlement, Vozhegodsky District, Vologda Oblast, Russia. The population was 54 as of 2002.

== Geography ==
The distance to Vozhega is 36 km, to Gridino is 12 km. Bukhara, Ogarkovskaya, Antsiferovskaya are the nearest rural localities.
