= Sigovskaya =

Sigovskaya Сиговская
- Village
- Location within Vologda Oblast Location within Russia
- Coordinates: 60°20′N 40°47′E
- Country: Russia
- Region: Vologda Oblast
- District: Vozhegodsky District
- Time zone: UTC+3:00

Sigovskaya (Russian: Сиговская) is a rural locality (a village) in Mityukovskoye Rural Settlement, Vozhegodsky District, Vologda Oblast, Russia. The population was 45 as of 2002.

== Geography ==
Sigovskaya is located 63 km southeast of Vozhega (the district's administrative centre) by road. Galuninskaya is the nearest rural locality.
