= Ugol, Vozhegodsky District, Vologda Oblast =

Ugol Угол
- Village
- Location within Vologda Oblast Location within Russia
- Coordinates: 60°25′N 40°08′E
- Country: Russia
- Region: Vologda Oblast
- District: Vozhegodsky District
- Time zone: UTC+3:00

Ugol (Russian: Угол) is a rural locality (a village) in Vozhegodskoye Urban Settlement, Vozhegodsky District, Vologda Oblast, Russia. The population was 13 as of 2002.

== Geography ==
Ugol is located 8 km southwest of Vozhega (the district's administrative centre) by road. Nesterikha is the nearest rural locality.
