= Uglenskaya =

Uglenskaya Угленская
- Village
- Location within Vologda Oblast Location within Russia
- Coordinates: 60°28′N 40°49′E
- Country: Russia
- Region: Vologda Oblast
- District: Vozhegodsky District
- Time zone: UTC+3:00

Uglenskaya (Russian: Угленская) is a rural locality (a village) in Nizhneslobodskoye Rural Settlement, Vozhegodsky District, Vologda Oblast, Russia. The population was 12 as of 2002.

== Geography ==
Uglenskaya is located 39 km east of Vozhega (the district's administrative centre) by road. Zarechnaya is the nearest rural locality.
