= Bolshaya Klimovskaya =

Bolshaya Klimovskaya Большая Климовская
- Village
- Location within Vologda Oblast Location within Russia
- Coordinates: 60°28′N 40°11′E
- Country: Russia
- Region: Vologda Oblast
- District: Vozhegodsky District
- Time zone: UTC+3:00

Bolshaya Klimovskaya (Russian: Большая Климовская) is a rural locality (a village) in Vozhegodskoye Urban settlement, Vozhegodsky District, Vologda Oblast, Russia. The population was 458 as of 2002.

== Geography ==
Bolshaya Klimovskaya is located 1 km northwest of Vozhega (the district's administrative centre) by road. Vozhega is the nearest rural locality.
