= Novozhilikha =

Novozhilikha Новожилиха
- Village
- Location within Vologda Oblast Location within Russia
- Coordinates: 60°25′N 40°06′E
- Country: Russia
- Region: Vologda Oblast
- District: Vozhegodsky District
- Time zone: UTC+3:00

Novozhilikha (Russian: Новожилиха) is a rural locality (a village) in Vozhegodskoye Urban Settlement, Vozhegodsky District, Vologda Oblast, Russia. The population was 12 as of 2002.

== Geography ==
Novozhilikha is located 9 km (5.6 mi) southwest of Vozhega (the district's administrative centre) by road. Popovka is the nearest rural locality.
