= Yakhrenga =

Yakhrenga Яхренга
- Settlement
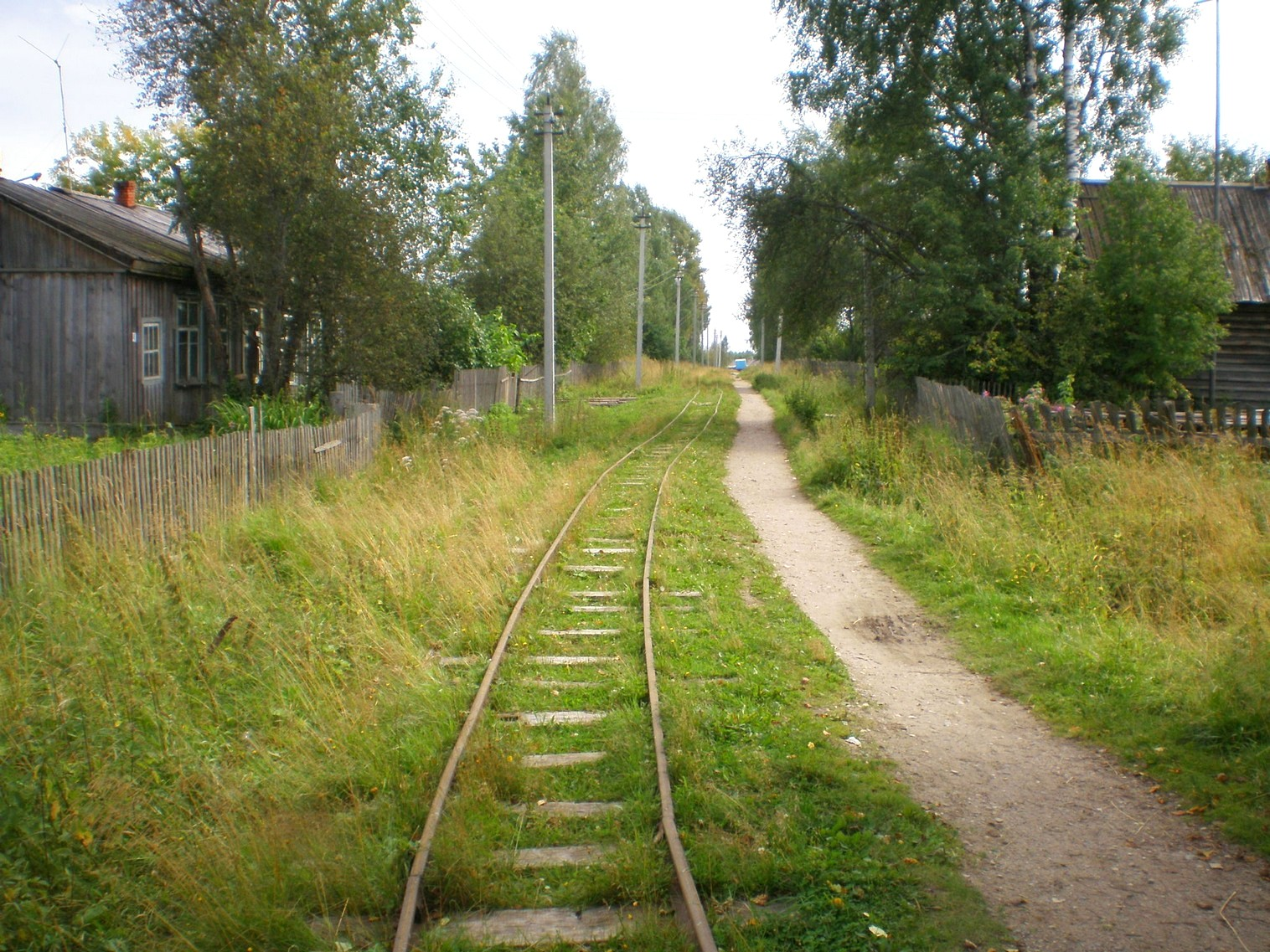
- A derelict railway with houses on either side

- Location within Vologda Oblast Location within Russia
- Coordinates: 60°19′N 40°00′E
- Country: Russia
- Region: Vologda Oblast
- District: Vozhegodsky District

Population (2026)
  - Total: ▼157
- Time zone: UTC+3:00

Yakhrenga (Russian: Яхренга) is a rural locality (a settlement) in Kadnikovskoye Rural Settlement, Vozhegodsky District, Vologda Oblast, Russia. The population was 288 as of 2002. There are 8 streets.

== Geography ==
Yakhrenga is located 25 km southwest of Vozhega (the district's administrative centre) by road. Vozhega is the nearest rural locality.
