= Zuyevo, Vozhegodsky District, Vologda Oblast =

Zuyevo Зуево
- Village
- Location within Vologda Oblast Location within Russia
- Coordinates: 60°20′N 39°11′E
- Country: Russia
- Region: Vologda Oblast
- District: Vozhegodsky District
- Time zone: UTC+3:00

Zuyevo (Russian: Зуево) is a rural locality (a village) in Beketovskoye Rural Settlement, Vozhegodsky District, Vologda Oblast, Russia. The population was 16 as of 2002.

== Geography ==
Zuyevo is located 78 km southwest of Vozhega (the district's administrative centre) by road. Pokrovskaya is the nearest rural locality.
