= Olyushinskaya =

Olyushinskaya Олюшинская
- Village
- Location within Vologda Oblast Location within Russia
- Coordinates: 60°30′N 40°55′E
- Country: Russia
- Region: Vologda Oblast
- District: Vozhegodsky District
- Time zone: UTC+3:00

Olyushinskaya (Russian: Олюшинская) is a rural locality (a village) in Nizhneslobodskoye Rural Settlement, Vozhegodsky District, Vologda Oblast, Russia. The population was 35 as of 2002.

== Geography ==
Olyushinskaya is located 45 km east of Vozhega (the district's administrative centre) by road. Yeskinskaya is the nearest rural locality.
