= Yereminskaya =

Yereminskaya Ереминская
- Village
- Location within Vologda Oblast Location within Russia
- Coordinates: 60°27′N 41°05′E
- Country: Russia
- Region: Vologda Oblast
- District: Vozhegodsky District
- Time zone: UTC+3:00

Yereminskaya (Russian: Ереминская) is a rural locality (a village) in Nizhneslobodskoye Rural Settlement, Vozhegodsky District, Vologda Oblast, Russia. The population was 34 as of 2002.

== Geography ==
Yereminskaya is located 56 km east of Vozhega (the district's administrative centre) by road. Isakovskaya is the nearest rural locality.
