= Popovka Kalikinskaya =

Popovka Kalikinskaya Поповка Каликинская
- Village
- Location within Vologda Oblast Location within Russia
- Coordinates: 60°22′N 39°16′E
- Country: Russia
- Region: Vologda Oblast
- District: Vozhegodsky District
- Time zone: UTC+3:00

Popovka Kalikinskaya (Russian: Поповка Каликинская) is a rural locality (a village) in Beketovskoye Rural Settlement, Vozhegodsky District, Vologda Oblast, Russia. The population was 14 as of 2002.

== Geography ==
Popovka Kalikinskaya is located 72 km southwest of Vozhega (the district's administrative centre) by road. Nikitino is the nearest rural locality.
