= Agafonovskaya, Vozhegodsky District, Vologda Oblast =

Agafonovskaya Агафоновская
- Village
- Location within Vologda Oblast Location within Russia
- Coordinates: 60°28′N 41°10′E
- Country: Russia
- Region: Vologda Oblast
- District: Vozhegodsky District
- Time zone: UTC+3:00

Agafonovskaya (Russian: Агафоновская) is a rural locality (a village) in Mishutinskoye Rural Settlement, Vozhegodsky District, Vologda Oblast, Russia. The population was 2 as of 2002.

== Geography ==
Agafonovskaya is located 63 km east of Vozhega (the district's administrative centre) by road. Popovka is the nearest rural locality.
