= Chichirino =

Chichirino Чичирино
- Village
- Location within Vologda Oblast Location within Russia
- Coordinates: 60°21′N 39°17′E
- Country: Russia
- Region: Vologda Oblast
- District: Vozhegodsky District
- Time zone: UTC+3:00

Chichirino (Russian: Чичирино) is a rural locality (a village) in Beketovskoye Rural Settlement, Vozhegodsky District, Vologda Oblast, Russia. The population was 8 as of 2002.

== Geography ==
Chichirino is located 2 km northwest of Vozhega (the district's administrative centre) by road. Vozhega is the nearest rural locality.
