= Peshkovo =

Peshkovo Пешково
- Village
- Location within Vologda Oblast Location within Russia
- Coordinates: 60°24′N 40°03′E
- Country: Russia
- Region: Vologda Oblast
- District: Vozhegodsky District
- Time zone: UTC+3:00

Peshkovo (Russian: Пешково) is a rural locality (a village) in Vozhegodskoye Urban Settlement, Vozhegodsky District, Vologda Oblast, Russia. The population was 1 as of 2002.

== Geography ==
Peshkovo is located 14 km southwest of Vozhega (the district's administrative centre) by road. Sorozhinskaya is the nearest rural locality.
