= Tyurikovskaya =

Tyurikovskaya Тюриковская
- Village
- Location within Vologda Oblast Location within Russia
- Coordinates: 60°41′N 40°25′E
- Country: Russia
- Region: Vologda Oblast
- District: Vozhegodsky District
- Time zone: UTC+3:00

Tyurikovskaya (Russian: Тюриковская) is a rural locality (a village) in Yavengskoye Rural Settlement, Vozhegodsky District, Vologda Oblast, Russia. The population was 30 as of 2002.

== Geography ==
Tyurikovskaya is located 39 km northeast of Vozhega (the district's administrative centre) by road. Turovo is the nearest rural locality.
