= Kuznetsovskaya =

Kuznetsovskaya Кузнецовская
- Village
- Location within Vologda Oblast Location within Russia
- Coordinates: 60°24′N 40°02′E
- Country: Russia
- Region: Vologda Oblast
- District: Vozhegodsky District
- Time zone: UTC+3:00

Kuznetsovskaya (Russian: Кузнецовская) is a rural locality (a village) in Vozhegodsky District, Vologda Oblast, Russia. The population was 4 as of 2002.

== Geography ==
Kuznetsovskaya is located 13 km southwest of Vozhega (the district's administrative centre) by road. Malaya Klimovskaya is the nearest rural locality.
