= Gora, Tiginskoye Rural Settlement, Vozhegodsky District, Vologda Oblast =

Gora Гора
- Village
- Location within Vologda Oblast Location within Russia
- Coordinates: 60°40′N 39°37′E
- Country: Russia
- Region: Vologda Oblast
- District: Vozhegodsky District
- Time zone: UTC+3:00

Gora (Russian: Гора) is a rural locality (a village) in Tiginskoye Rural Settlement, Vozhegodsky District, Vologda Oblast, Russia. The population was 9 as of 2002.

== Geography ==
The distance to Vozhega is 52 km, to Gridino is 26 km. Baranikha, Mushchininskaya, Lobanikha, Pozdeyevskaya, Zabereznik, Korotkovskaya, Zavrag, Koryakinskaya, Grishkovskaya, Shibayevskaya are the nearest rural localities.
