= Konechnaya, Punemsky Selsoviet, Vozhegodsky District, Vologda Oblast =

Konechnaya Конечная
- Village
- Location within Vologda Oblast Location within Russia
- Coordinates: 60°20′N 39°12′E
- Country: Russia
- Region: Vologda Oblast
- District: Vozhegodsky District
- Time zone: UTC+3:00

Konechnaya (Russian: Конечная) is a rural locality (a village) in Beketovskoye Rural Settlement, Vozhegodsky District, Vologda Oblast, Russia. The population was 2 as of 2002.

== Geography ==
The distance to Vozhega is 81.5 km, to Beketovskaya is 25 km. Mytnik, Tigino, Pokrovskaya, Zuyevo, Kuritsino, Filatovskaya, Strokavino are the nearest rural localities.
