= Malaya Nazarovskaya =

Malaya Nazarovskaya Малая Назаровская
- Village
- Location within Vologda Oblast Location within Russia
- Coordinates: 60°33′N 40°07′E
- Country: Russia
- Region: Vologda Oblast
- District: Vozhegodsky District
- Time zone: UTC+3:00

Malaya Nazarovskaya (Russian: Малая Назаровская) is a rural locality (a village) in Yavengskoye Rural Settlement, Vozhegodsky District, Vologda Oblast, Russia. The population was 5 as of 2002.

== Geography ==
Malaya Nazarovskaya is located 11 km northwest of Vozhega (the district's administrative centre) by road. Vafunenskaya is the nearest rural locality.
