= Gora, Yavengskoye Rural Settlement, Vozhegodsky District, Vologda Oblast =

Gora Гора
- Village
- Location within Vologda Oblast Location within Russia
- Coordinates: 60°37′N 40°34′E
- Country: Russia
- Region: Vologda Oblast
- District: Vozhegodsky District
- Time zone: UTC+3:00

Gora (Russian: Гора) is a rural locality (a village) in Yavengskoye Rural Settlement, Vozhegodsky District, Vologda Oblast, Russia. The population was 2 as of 2002.

== Geography ==
The distance to Vozhega is 37 km, to Baza is 23 km. Dorkovskaya, Antsiferovskaya, Fedyayevskaya are the nearest rural localities.
