= Pesok, Tavengsky Selsoviet, Vozhegodsky District, Vologda Oblast =

Pesok Песок
- Village
- Location within Vologda Oblast Location within Russia
- Coordinates: 60°38′N 39°38′E
- Country: Russia
- Region: Vologda Oblast
- District: Vozhegodsky District
- Time zone: UTC+3:00

Pesok (Russian: Песок) is a rural locality (a village) in Vozhegodsky District, Vologda Oblast, Russia. The population was 16 as of 2002.

== Geography ==
Pesok is located 2 km northwest of Vozhega (the district's administrative centre) by road. Vozhega is the nearest rural locality.
