= Stepanikha, Vozhegodskoye Urban Settlement, Vozhegodsky District, Vologda Oblast =

Stepanikha Степаниха
- Village
- Location within Vologda Oblast Location within Russia
- Coordinates: 60°25′N 40°23′E
- Country: Russia
- Region: Vologda Oblast
- District: Vozhegodsky District
- Time zone: UTC+3:00

Stepanikha (Russian: Степаниха) is a rural locality (a village) in Vozhegodskoye Urban Settlement, Vozhegodsky District, Vologda Oblast, Russia. The population was 3 as of 2002.

== Geography ==
The distance to Vozhega is 11.6 km. Lupachi, Koroli, Korovinskaya are the nearest rural localities.
