= Konechnaya, Lipino-Kalikinsky Selsoviet, Vozhegodsky District, Vologda Oblast =

Konechnaya Конечная
- Village
- Location within Vologda Oblast Location within Russia
- Coordinates: 60°24′N 39°26′E
- Country: Russia
- Region: Vologda Oblast
- District: Vozhegodsky District
- Time zone: UTC+3:00

Konechnaya (Russian: Конечная) is a rural locality (a village) in Beketovskoye Rural Settlement, Vozhegodsky District, Vologda Oblast, Russia. The population was 5 as of 2002.

== Geography ==
The distance to Vozhega is 66 km, to Beketovskaya is 10 km. Yelenskaya, Rakishevo, Mitrofanovo, Syrnevo, Vrazhnaya, Pankovo are the nearest rural localities.
