= Syrnevo =

Syrnevo Сырнево
- Village
- Location within Vologda Oblast Location within Russia
- Coordinates: 60°24′N 39°25′E
- Country: Russia
- Region: Vologda Oblast
- District: Vozhegodsky District
- Time zone: UTC+3:00

Syrnevo (Russian: Сырнево) is a rural locality (a village) in Beketovskoye Rural Settlement, Vozhegodsky District, Vologda Oblast, Russia. The population was 14 as of 2002.

== Geography ==
Syrnevo is located 67 km west of Vozhega (the district's administrative centre) by road. Yelenskaya is the nearest rural locality.
