= Barkanovskaya =

Barkanovskaya Баркановская
- Village
- Location within Vologda Oblast Location within Russia
- Coordinates: 60°36′N 39°13′E
- Country: Russia
- Region: Vologda Oblast
- District: Vozhegodsky District
- Time zone: UTC+3:00

Barkanovskaya (Russian: Баркановская) is a rural locality (a village) in Beketovskoye Rural Settlement, Vozhegodsky District, Vologda Oblast, Russia. The population was 10 as of 2002.

== Geography ==
Barkanovskaya is located 72 km northwest of Vozhega (the district's administrative centre) by road. Semyonovskaya is the nearest rural locality.
