= Khmylitsa =

Khmylitsa Хмылица
- Village
- Location within Vologda Oblast Location within Russia
- Coordinates: 60°33′N 39°51′E
- Country: Russia
- Region: Vologda Oblast
- District: Vozhegodsky District
- Time zone: UTC+3:00

Khmylitsa (Russian: Хмылица) is a rural locality (a village) in Tiginskoye Rural Settlement, Vozhegodsky District, Vologda Oblast, Russia. The population was 17 as of 2002.

== Geography ==
Khmylitsa is located 28 km northwest of Vozhega (the district's administrative centre) by road. Stolbikha is the nearest rural locality.
