= Shchekotovskaya, Vozhegodsky District, Vologda Oblast =

Shchekotovskaya Щекотовская
- Village
- Location within Vologda Oblast Location within Russia
- Coordinates: 60°34′N 40°06′E
- Country: Russia
- Region: Vologda Oblast
- District: Vozhegodsky District
- Time zone: UTC+3:00

Shchekotovskaya (Russian: Щекотовская) is a rural locality (a village) in Yavengskoye Rural Settlement, Vozhegodsky District, Vologda Oblast, Russia. The population was 14 as of 2002.

== Geography ==
Shchekotovskaya is located 14 km northwest of Vozhega (the district's administrative centre) by road. Padinskaya is the nearest rural locality.
