= Konevka =

Konevka Коневка
- Village
- Location within Vologda Oblast Location within Russia
- Coordinates: 60°28′N 39°49′E
- Country: Russia
- Region: Vologda Oblast
- District: Vozhegodsky District
- Time zone: UTC+3:00

Konevka (Russian: Коневка) is a rural locality (a village) in Tigisnkoye Rural Settlement, Vozhegodsky District, Vologda Oblast, Russia. The population was 81 as of 2002.

== Geography ==
Konevka is located 23 km west of Vozhega (the district's administrative centre) by road. Savinskaya is the nearest rural locality.
