= Kozlovo, Beketovskoye Rural Settlement, Vozhegodsky District, Vologda Oblast =

Kozlovo Козлово
- Village
- Location within Vologda Oblast Location within Russia
- Coordinates: 60°24′N 39°21′E
- Country: Russia
- Region: Vologda Oblast
- District: Vozhegodsky District
- Time zone: UTC+3:00

Kozlovo (Russian: Козлово) is a rural locality (a village) in Beketovskoye Rural Settlement, Vozhegodsky District, Vologda Oblast, Russia. The population was 45 as of 2002.

== Geography ==
The distance to Vozhega is 62 km and to Beketovskaya is 11 km. Pekhtach, Yakovlevo, Salnik, and Myshino are the nearest rural localities.
