= Korotkovskaya =

Korotkovskaya Коротковская
- Village
- Location within Vologda Oblast Location within Russia
- Coordinates: 60°40′N 39°37′E
- Country: Russia
- Region: Vologda Oblast
- District: Vozhegodsky District
- Time zone: UTC+3:00

Korotkovskaya (Russian: Коротковская) is a rural locality (a village) in Tiginskoye Rural Settlement, Vozhegodsky District, Vologda Oblast, Russia. The population was 25 as of 2002.

== Geography ==
Korotkovskaya is located 51 km northwest of Vozhega (the district's administrative centre) by road. Lobanikha is the nearest rural locality.
