= Pozdeyevskaya =

Pozdeyevskaya Поздеевская
- Village
- Location within Vologda Oblast Location within Russia
- Coordinates: 60°39′N 39°37′E
- Country: Russia
- Region: Vologda Oblast
- District: Vozhegodsky District
- Time zone: UTC+3:00

Pozdeyevskaya (Russian: Поздеевская) is a rural locality (a village) in Tiginskoye Rural Settlement, Vozhegodsky District, Vologda Oblast, Russia. The population was 21 as of 2002.

== Geography ==
Pozdeyevskaya is located 51 km northwest of Vozhega (the district's administrative centre) by road. Zavrag is the nearest rural locality.
