= Baza, Vologda Oblast =

Baza База
- Village
- Location within Vologda Oblast Location within Russia
- Coordinates: 60°36′N 40°08′E
- Country: Russia
- Region: Vologda Oblast
- District: Vozhegodsky District
- Time zone: UTC+3:00

Baza (Russian: База) is a rural locality (a village) and the administrative center of Yavengskoye Rural Settlement, Vozhegodsky District, Vologda Oblast, Russia. The population was 576 as of 2002. There are 10 streets.

== Geography ==
Baza is located 20 km north of Vozhega (the district's administrative centre) by road. Pokrovskoye is the nearest rural locality.
