= Olyushino, Vozhegodsky District, Vologda Oblast =

Olyushino Олюшино
- Village
- Location within Vologda Oblast Location within Russia
- Coordinates: 60°33′N 39°39′E
- Country: Russia
- Region: Vologda Oblast
- District: Vozhegodsky District
- Time zone: UTC+3:00

Olyushino (Russian: Олюшино) is a rural locality (a village) in Tiginskoye Rural Settlement, Vozhegodsky District, Vologda Oblast, Russia. The population was 18 as of 2002.

== Geography ==
Olyushino is located 40 km northwest of Vozhega (the district's administrative centre) by road. Ogibalovo is the nearest rural locality.
