= Gridinskaya, Yuchkinskoye Rural Settlement, Vozhegodsky District, Vologda Oblast =

Gridinskaya Гридинская
- Village
- Location within Vologda Oblast Location within Russia
- Coordinates: 60°20′N 40°45′E
- Country: Russia
- Region: Vologda Oblast
- District: Vozhegodsky District
- Time zone: UTC+3:00

Gridinskaya (Russian: Гридинская) is a rural locality (a village) in Mityukovskoye Rural Settlement, Vozhegodsky District, Vologda Oblast, Russia. The population was 22 as of 2002.

== Geography ==
The distance to Vozhega is 72 km and 4 km to Sosnovitsa. Galuninskaya, Sigovskaya, Bykovskaya are the nearest rural localities.
