= Antsiferovskaya =

Antsiferovskaya Анциферовская
- Village
- Location within Vologda Oblast Location within Russia
- Coordinates: 60°34′N 39°50′E
- Country: Russia
- Region: Vologda Oblast
- District: Vozhegodsky District
- Time zone: UTC+3:00

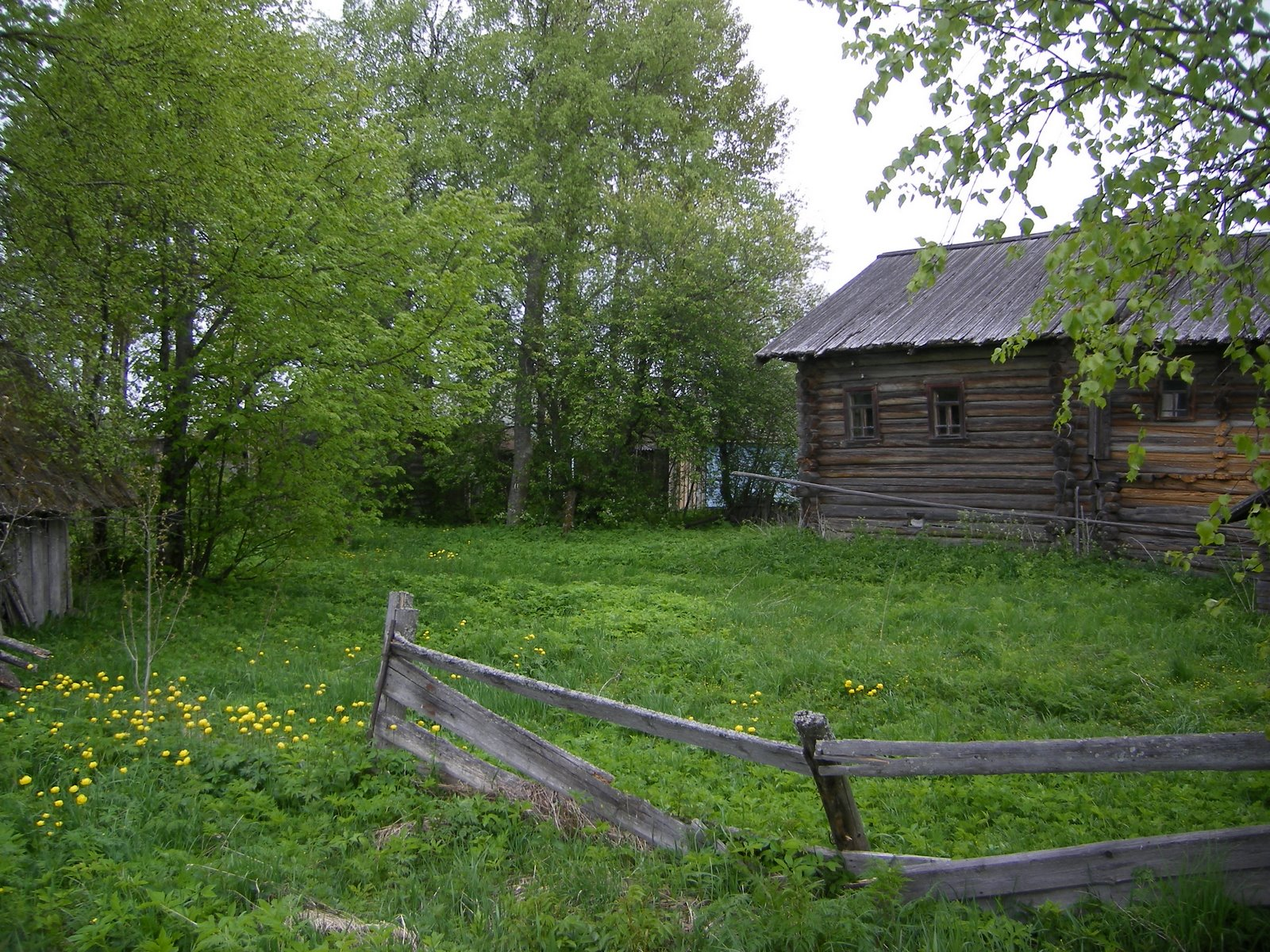
Antsiferovskaya village

Antsiferovskaya (Russian: Анциферовская) is a rural locality (a village) in Tiginskoye Rural Settlement, Vozhegodsky District, Vologda Oblast, Russia. The population was 59 as of 2002.

== Geography ==
The distance to Vozhega is 34 km, to Gridino is 11 km. Ogarkovskaya, Stolbikha, Khmylitsa are the nearest rural localities.
