= Isakovskaya, Vozhegodsky District, Vologda Oblast =

Isakovskaya Исаковская
- Village
- Location within Vologda Oblast Location within Russia
- Coordinates: 60°28′N 41°06′E
- Country: Russia
- Region: Vologda Oblast
- District: Vozhegodsky District
- Time zone: UTC+3:00

Isakovskaya (Russian: Исаковская) is a rural locality (a village) in Nizhneslobodskoye Rural Settlement, Vozhegodsky District, Vologda Oblast, Russia. The population was 9 as of 2002.

== Geography ==
Isakovskaya is located 56 km east of Vozhega (the district's administrative centre) by road. Yereminskaya is the nearest rural locality.
