= Pozhar, Vologda Oblast =

Pozhar Пожар
- Village
- Location within Vologda Oblast Location within Russia
- Coordinates: 60°29′N 39°51′E
- Country: Russia
- Region: Vologda Oblast
- District: Vozhegodsky District
- Time zone: UTC+3:00

Pozhar (Russian: Пожар) is a rural locality (a village) in Tiginskoye Rural Settlement, Vozhegodsky District, Vologda Oblast, Russia. The population was 16 as of 2002.

== Geography ==
Pozhar is located 21 km west of Vozhega (the district's administrative centre) by road. Petrovka is the nearest rural locality.
