= Mitinskaya, Yavengskoye Rural Settlement, Vozhegodsky District, Vologda Oblast =

Mitinskaya Митинская
- Village
- Location within Vologda Oblast Location within Russia
- Coordinates: 60°37′N 40°11′E
- Country: Russia
- Region: Vologda Oblast
- District: Vozhegodsky District
- Time zone: UTC+3:00

Mitinskaya (Russian: Митинская) is a rural locality (a village) in Yavengskoye Rural Settlement, Vozhegodsky District, Vologda Oblast, Russia. The population was 13 as of 2002.

== Geography ==
The distance to Vozhega is 21 km, to Baza is 3 km. Proletarsky, Soroginskaya, Timoninskaya are the nearest rural localities.
