= Lukyanovskaya =

Lukyanovskaya Лукьяновская
- Village
- Location within Vologda Oblast Location within Russia
- Coordinates: 60°30′N 41°07′E
- Country: Russia
- Region: Vologda Oblast
- District: Vozhegodsky District
- Time zone: UTC+3:00

Lukyanovskaya (Russian: Лукьяновская) is a rural locality (a village) in Mishutinskoye Rural Settlement, Vozhegodsky District, Vologda Oblast, Russia. The population was 82 as of 2002.

== Geography ==
Lukyanovskaya is located 58 km east of Vozhega (the district's administrative centre) by road. Klimovskaya is the nearest rural locality.
