= Stolbikha =

Stolbikha Столбиха
- Village
- Location within Vologda Oblast Location within Russia
- Coordinates: 60°34′N 39°50′E
- Country: Russia
- Region: Vologda Oblast
- District: Vozhegodsky District
- Time zone: UTC+3:00

Stolbikha (Russian: Столбиха) is a rural locality (a village) in Tiginskoye Rural Settlement, Vozhegodsky District, Vologda Oblast, Russia. The population was 29 as of 2002.

== Geography ==
Stolbikha is located 29 km northwest of Vozhega (the district's administrative centre) by road. Khmylitsa is the nearest rural locality.
