= Nikitinskaya, Vozhegodsky District, Vologda Oblast =

Nikitinskaya Никитинская
- Village
- Location within Vologda Oblast Location within Russia
- Coordinates: 60°27′N 39°53′E
- Country: Russia
- Region: Vologda Oblast
- District: Vozhegodsky District
- Time zone: UTC+3:00

Nikitinskaya (Russian: Никитинская) is a rural locality (a village) in Tiginskoye Rural Settlement, Vozhegodsky District, Vologda Oblast, Russia. The population was 55 as of 2002.

== Geography ==
Nikitinskaya is located 19 km west of Vozhega (the district's administrative centre) by road. Leshchyovka is the nearest rural locality.
