= Ruchyevskaya, Vozhegodsky District, Vologda Oblast =

Ruchyevskaya Ручьевская
- Village
- Location within Vologda Oblast Location within Russia
- Coordinates: 60°32′N 39°20′E
- Country: Russia
- Region: Vologda Oblast
- District: Vozhegodsky District
- Time zone: UTC+3:00

Ruchyevskaya (Russian: Ручьевская) is a rural locality (a village) in Beketovskoye Rural Settlement, Vozhegodsky District, Vologda Oblast, Russia. The population was 5 as of 2002.

== Geography ==
Ruchyevskaya is located 60 km west of Vozhega (the district's administrative centre) by road. Anufriyevskaya is the nearest rural locality.
