= Porokhino =

Porokhino Порохино
- Village
- Location within Vologda Oblast Location within Russia
- Coordinates: 60°30′N 39°27′E
- Country: Russia
- Region: Vologda Oblast
- District: Vozhegodsky District
- Time zone: UTC+3:00

Porokhino (Russian: Порохино) is a rural locality (a village) in Beketovskoye Rural Settlement, Vozhegodsky District, Vologda Oblast, Russia. The population was 13 as of 2002.

== Geography ==
Porokhino is located 56 km west of Vozhega (the district's administrative centre) by road. Tarasovskaya is the nearest rural locality.
