= Maryinskaya =

Maryinskaya Марьинская
- Village
- Location within Vologda Oblast Location within Russia
- Coordinates: 60°32′N 40°23′E
- Country: Russia
- Region: Vologda Oblast
- District: Vozhegodsky District
- Time zone: UTC+3:00

Maryinskaya (Russian: Марьинская) is a rural locality (a village) in Yavengskoye Rural Settlement, Vozhegodsky District, Vologda Oblast, Russia. The population was 138 as of 2002.

== Geography ==
Maryinskaya is located 18 km southwest of Vozhega (the district's administrative centre) by road. Perepechikha is the nearest rural locality.
