= Glazunovsky =

Glazunovsky (masculine), Glazunovskaya (feminine), or Glazunovskoye (neuter) may refer to:

- Glazunovsky District, a district of Oryol Oblast, Russia
- Glazunovsky (rural locality) (Glazunovskaya, Glazunovskoye), name of several rural localities in Russia
