= Glazunovsky (rural locality) =

Glazunovsky (Russian: Глазуновский; masculine), Glazunovskaya (Глазуновская; feminine), or Glazunovskoye (Глазуновское; neuter) is the name of several rural localities in Russia:

- Glazunovskaya, Volgograd Oblast, a stanitsa in Glazunovsky Selsoviet of Kumylzhensky District of Volgograd Oblast
- Glazunovskaya, Vologda Oblast, a village in Mishutinsky Selsoviet of Vozhegodsky District of Vologda Oblast
