= Alferyevskaya =

Alferyevskaya Алферьевская
- Village
- Location within Vologda Oblast Location within Russia
- Coordinates: 60°25′09″N 41°12′55″E
- Country: Russia
- Region: Vologda Oblast
- District: Vozhegodsky District
- Time zone: UTC+3:00

Alferyevskaya (Russian: Алферьевская) is a rural locality (a village) in Mishutinskoye Rural Settlement, Vozhegodsky District, Vologda Oblast, Russia. The population was 2 as of 2002.

== Geography ==
Alferyevskaya is located 70 km east of Vozhega (the district's administrative centre) by road. Loshchinskaya is the nearest rural locality.
