= Yesinskaya =

Yesinskaya Есинская
- Village
- Location within Vologda Oblast Location within Russia
- Coordinates: 60°24′N 41°12′E
- Country: Russia
- Region: Vologda Oblast
- District: Vozhegodsky District
- Time zone: UTC+3:00

Yesinskaya (Russian: Есинская) is a rural locality (a village) in Mishutinskoye Rural Settlement, Vozhegodsky District, Vologda Oblast, Russia. The population was 21 as of 2002.

== Geography ==
Yesinskaya is located 71 km east of Vozhega (the district's administrative centre) by road. Timoninskaya is the nearest rural locality.
