= Popovka, Vozhegodskoye Urban Settlement, Vozhegodsky District, Vologda Oblast =

Popovka Поповка
- Village
- Location within Vologda Oblast Location within Russia
- Country: Russia
- Region: Vologda Oblast
- District: Vozhegodsky District

Popovka (Russian: Поповка) is a rural locality (a village) in Vozhegodskoye Urban Settlement, Vozhegodsky District, Vologda Oblast, Russia. The population was two in 2002.
