= Mishutinskaya =

Mishutinskaya Мишутинская
- Village
- Location within Vologda Oblast Location within Russia
- Coordinates: 60°27′N 41°13′E
- Country: Russia
- Region: Vologda Oblast
- District: Vozhegodsky District
- Time zone: UTC+3:00

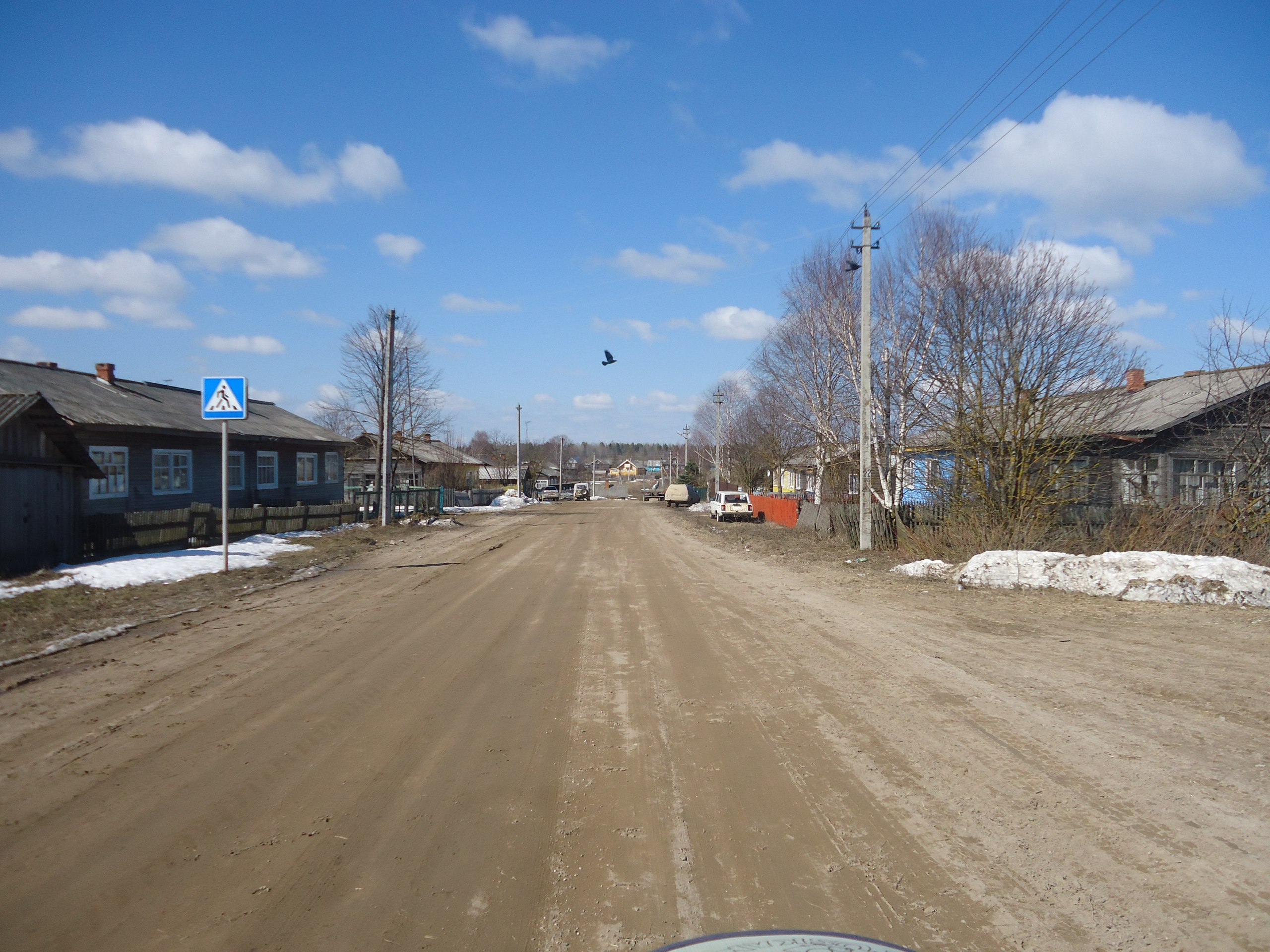
Main street of Mishutino

Mishutinskaya (Russian: Мишутинская) is a rural locality (a village) and the administrative center of Mishutinskoye Rural Settlement, Vozhegodsky District, Vologda Oblast, Russia. The population was 135 as of 2002.

== Geography ==
Mishutinskaya is located 66 km east of Vozhega (the district's administrative centre) by road. Patrakeyevskaya is the nearest rural locality.
