= Glazunovskaya, Vologda Oblast =

Glazunovskaya Глазуновская
- Village
- Location within Vologda Oblast Location within Russia
- Coordinates: 60°24′N 41°13′E
- Country: Russia
- Region: Vologda Oblast
- District: Vozhegodsky District
- Time zone: UTC+3:00

Glazunovskaya (Russian: Глазуновская) is a rural locality (a village) in Mishutinskoye Rural Settlement, Vozhegodsky District, Vologda Oblast, Russia. The population was 5 as of 2002.

== Geography ==
Glazunovskaya is located 71 km east of Vozhega (the district's administrative centre) by road. Loshchinskaya is the nearest rural locality.
