= Baranovskaya, Vozhegodsky District, Vologda Oblast =

Baranovskaya Барановская
- Village
- Location within Vologda Oblast Location within Russia
- Coordinates: 60°32′N 39°33′E
- Country: Russia
- Region: Vologda Oblast
- District: Vozhegodsky District
- Time zone: UTC+3:00

Baranovskaya (Russian: Барановская) is a rural locality (a village) in Beketovskoye Rural Settlement, Vozhegodsky District, Vologda Oblast, Russia. The population was 46 as of 2002.

== Geography ==
The distance to Vozhega is 43 km, to Beketovskaya is 9 km. Nazarovskaya, Surkovskaya, Navolok are the nearest rural localities.
