= Vozhega =

Vozhega Вожега
- Urban-type settlement
- Interactive map of Vozhega
- Location of Vozhega Vozhega (Vologda Oblast)
- Coordinates: 60°28′N 40°12′E
- Country: Russia
- Federal subject: Vologda Oblast
- Administrative district: Vozhegodsky District
- Founded: 1895
- Urban-type settlement status since: 1932

Population (2010 Census)
  - Total: 6,725
  - Estimate (2023): 6,015 (−10.6%)

Administrative status
  - Capital of: Vozhegodsky District, Vozhegodsky Selsoviet

Municipal status
  - Municipal district: Vozhegodsky Municipal District
  - Urban settlement: Vozhegodskoye Urban Settlement
  - Capital of: Vozhegodskoye Urban Settlement
- Time zone: UTC+3 (MSK)
- Postal code: 162160
- OKTMO ID: 19618151051

Vozhega (Russian: Во́жега) is an urban locality (an urban-type settlement) and the administrative center of Vozhegodsky District of Vologda Oblast, Russia. It also serves as the administrative center of Vozhegodsky Selsoviet, although it is not part of it. Municipally, it is incorporated as Vozhegodskoye Urban Settlement, the only urban settlement in the district. Vozhega is located several kilometers off the course of the Vozhega River, on the right bank of the river. Population: 6,725 (2010 census); 6,835 (2002 census); 7,370 (1989 Soviet census).

== History ==
The area was sparsely populated until the end of 19th century, since it was far from all trade routes connecting Northern Russia with the White Sea. In 1894, the construction of the railway line between Vologda and Arkhangelsk started. It was decided that the railway should run over the shortest route rather than pass through existing settlements, and it was eventually built through the present area of the district. Vozhega was founded in 1895 as a railway station. It was included in Kadnikovsky Uyezd of Vologda Governorate. By 1929, the population of Vozhega, then the settlement at the railway station, was around 800.

On July 15, 1929, the uyezds were abolished, the governorates merged into the Northern Krai, and Vozhegodsky District was established among others, with the administrative center in the settlement at the Vozhega railway station. It became a part of Vologda Okrug of Northern Krai. In 1932, Vozhega became an urban-type settlement.

== Economy ==
=== Industry ===
Timber industry and food industry are present in Vozhega.

=== Transportation ===
Vozhega was founded as a railway station on the railroad connecting Vologda and Arkhangelsk.

Paved roads connect Vozhega with Konosha (there is an unpaved stretch) in the north and Syamzha via Kharovsk in the south, connecting the district to the main road network. There are also local roads and local bus traffic originating from Vozhega.

== Culture and recreation ==
The Vozhega Regional Museum is located in Vozhega.
