= Vozhegodsky District =

Vozhegodsky District Вожегодский район (Russian)
- District
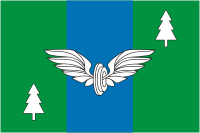
- Flag Coat of arms
- Location of Vozhegodsky District in Vologda Oblast
- Coordinates: 60°44′N 42°03′E
- Country: Russia
- Federal subject: Vologda Oblast
- Established: July 15, 1929
- Administrative center: Vozhega

Area
  - Total: 5,500 km^{2} (2,100 sq mi)

Population (2010 Census)
  - Total: 16,790
  - Density: 3.1/km^{2} (7.9/sq mi)
  - Urban: 40.1%
  - Rural: 59.9%

Administrative structure
  - Administrative divisions: 1 Urban-type settlements, 15 Selsoviets
  - Inhabited localities: 1 urban-type settlements, 308 rural localities

Municipal structure
  - Municipally incorporated as: Vozhegodsky Municipal District
  - Municipal divisions: 1 urban settlements, 7 rural settlements
- Time zone: UTC+3 (MSK)
- OKTMO ID: 19618000
- Website: http://www.vozhega.ru

Vozhegodsky District (Russian: Вожего́дский райо́н) is an administrative and municipal district (raion), one of the twenty-six in Vologda Oblast, Russia. It is located in the north of the oblast and borders with Konoshsky District of Arkhangelsk Oblast in the north, Verkhovazhsky District in the east, Syamzhensky District in the southeast, Kharovsky District in the south, Ust-Kubinsky District in the southwest, and with Kirillovsky District in the west. The area of the district is 5,500 square kilometers (2,100 sq mi). Its administrative center is the urban locality (a work settlement) of Vozhega. Population: 16,790 (2010 Census); 18,976 (2002 Census); 22,470 (1989 Soviet census). The population of Vozhega accounts for 40.1% of the district's total population.

== Geography ==
The area of the district is elongated from west to east and shared between three major drainage basins. The west border of the district is drawn across Lake Vozhe which belongs to the basin of the Onega River. The western and northwestern parts of the district are a part of Lake Vozhe's basin. The main tributary of the lake, the Vozhega River, has its entire course within the district. The central and eastern parts of the district belong to the basin of the Kubena River and its tributaries. The Kubena has its source in Arkhangelsk Oblast and flows south, crossing Vozhegodsky District from north to south. It has its mouth in Lake Kubenskoye and belongs to the basin of the Sukhona River. Minor areas in the southwest and the south of the district lie in the basin of the tributaries of the Kubena and of the Uftyuga River, which also flows into Lake Kubenskoye. Finally, rivers in some areas in the east of the district flow and drain east into the basin of the Vaga. In particular, one of the main left tributaries of the Vaga, the Pezhma, has its source located in the district. The whole area of the district belongs to the White Sea basin.

Woods occupy 78% of the district's territory. There are three designated protected areas of local significance: the zakazniks Maryinsky Bor and Tsaryov Bor, as well as the Northern Orchids Natural Monument.

Much of the area of the district is covered by swamps. The biggest one is the Charonda Swamp southeast of Lake Vozhe (shared also with Ust-Kubensky and Kirillovsky Districts).

== History ==
The area was populated by Finnic peoples and then colonized by the Novgorod Republic. After the fall of Novgorod, the area became a part of the Grand Duchy of Moscow. In the course of the administrative reform carried out in 1708 by Peter the Great, the area was split between Ingermanland Governorate (known from 1710 as Saint Petersburg Governorate), and from 1727, separate Novgorod Governorate (west) and Archangelgorod Governorate (east). In 1780, Archangelogorod Governorate was abolished and transformed into Vologda Viceroyalty, and in 1796 the latter was split into Arkhangelsk and Vologda Governorates. What is now Vozhegodsky District was then split between Kirillovsky Uyezd of Novgorod Governorate (west) and Kadnikovsky Uyezd of Vologda Governorate (east).

The area was sparsely populated until the end of the 19th century, due to its remote location from all the trade routes connecting Northern Russia with the White Sea. In 1894, the construction of the railway line between Vologda and Arkhangelsk started. The railway was planned to run over the shortest route rather than pass through existing settlements, and it was eventually built through the present area of the district. Vozhega was founded in 1895 as a railway station.

In 1918, five uyezds of Novgorod Governorate, including Kirillovsky Uyezd, were split off to form Cherepovets Governorate. In 1919, northwestern parts of Kirillovsky Uyezd were transferred to Kadnikovsky Uyezd of Vologda Governorate and Kargopolsky Uyezd of Olonets Governorate. The current territory of Vozhegodsky District was at this point in Kadnikovsky Uyezd.

On July 15, 1929, the uyezds were abolished, the governorates merged into Northern Krai, and Vozhegodsky District was established among others. It became a part of Vologda Okrug of Northern Krai. In the following years, the first-level administrative division of Russia kept changing. In 1936, the krai was transformed into Northern Oblast, which in turn was split into Arkhangelsk Oblast and Vologda Oblast in 1937. Vozhegodsky District remained in Vologda Oblast ever since.

== Economy ==
=== Industry ===
Timber industry and food industry are present in the district.

=== Agriculture ===
There are fifteen farms in the district which breed cattle, produce meat and milk, and grow crops, mostly to feed cattle.

=== Transportation ===
The railroad connecting Vologda and Arkhangelsk crosses the district from south to north. In particular, there is a railway station in Vozhega.

Paved roads connect Vozhega with Konosha (there is an unpaved stretch) in the north and Sokol and Syamzha via Kharovsk in the south, connecting the district to the main road network. There are also local roads and local bus traffic originating from Vozhega.

== Culture and recreation ==
The district contains seventy objects classified as cultural and historical heritage of local significance. Most of these are wooden farms and chapels built prior to 1917.

The only state museum in the district is the Vozhega Regional Museum, located in the settlement of Vozhega.
