= Borisovsky (rural locality) =

Borisovsky (Russian: Бори́совский; masculine), Borisovskaya (Бори́совская; feminine), or Borisovskoye (Бори́совское; neuter) is the name of several rural localities in Russia.

== Altai Krai ==
As of 2010, one rural locality in Altai Krai bears this name:

- Borisovsky, Altai Krai, a settlement in Krasnoarmeysky Selsoviet of Pankrushikhinsky District

== Arkhangelsk Oblast ==
As of 2010, eight rural localities in Arkhangelsk Oblast bear this name:

- Borisovskaya, Konoshsky District, Arkhangelsk Oblast, a village in Vadyinsky Selsoviet of Konoshsky District
- Borisovskaya, Kotlassky District, Arkhangelsk Oblast, a village in Votlazhemsky Selsoviet of Kotlassky District
- Borisovskaya, Krasnoborsky District, Arkhangelsk Oblast, a village in Cherevkovsky Selsoviet of Krasnoborsky District
- Borisovskaya, Lensky District, Arkhangelsk Oblast, a village in Lensky Selsoviet of Lensky District
- Borisovskaya, Primorsky District, Arkhangelsk Oblast, a village in Zaostrovsky Selsoviet of Primorsky District
- Borisovskaya, Velsky District, Arkhangelsk Oblast, a village in Puysky Selsoviet of Velsky District
- Borisovskaya, Fedkovsky Selsoviet, Verkhnetoyemsky District, Arkhangelsk Oblast, a village in Fedkovsky Selsoviet of Verkhnetoyemsky District
- Borisovskaya, Nizhnetoyemsky Selsoviet, Verkhnetoyemsky District, Arkhangelsk Oblast, a village in Nizhnetoyemsky Selsoviet of Verkhnetoyemsky District

== Bryansk Oblast ==
As of 2010, one rural locality in Bryansk Oblast bears this name:

- Borisovsky, Bryansk Oblast, a settlement in Zaulsky Selsoviet of Sevsky District

== Kaluga Oblast ==
As of 2010, one rural locality in Kaluga Oblast bears this name:

- Borisovsky, Kaluga Oblast, a settlement in Kuybyshevsky District

== Kostroma Oblast ==
As of 2010, two rural localities in Kostroma Oblast bear this name:

- Borisovskoye, Galichsky District, Kostroma Oblast, a village in Dmitriyevskoye Settlement of Galichsky District
- Borisovskoye, Soligalichsky District, Kostroma Oblast, a village in Soligalichskoye Settlement of Soligalichsky District

== Krasnodar Krai ==
As of 2010, one rural locality in Krasnodar Krai bears this name:

- Borisovsky, Krasnodar Krai, a khutor in Kiyevsky Rural Okrug of Krymsky District

== Moscow Oblast ==
As of 2010, one rural locality in Moscow Oblast bears this name:

- Borisovskoye, Moscow Oblast, a village in Provodnikovskoye Rural Settlement of Kolomensky District

== Nizhny Novgorod Oblast ==
As of 2010, one rural locality in Nizhny Novgorod Oblast bears this name:

- Borisovsky, Nizhny Novgorod Oblast, a settlement in Vasilevo-Maydansky Selsoviet of Pochinkovsky District

== Novosibirsk Oblast ==
As of 2010, one rural locality in Novosibirsk Oblast bears this name:

- Borisovsky, Novosibirsk Oblast, a settlement in Ordynsky District

== Omsk Oblast ==
As of 2010, one rural locality in Omsk Oblast bears this name:

- Borisovskoye, Omsk Oblast, a selo in Borisovsky Rural Okrug of Sherbakulsky District

== Ryazan Oblast ==
As of 2010, one rural locality in Ryazan Oblast bears this name:

- Borisovskoye, Ryazan Oblast, a selo in Komsomolsky Rural Okrug of Rybnovsky District

== Sverdlovsk Oblast ==
As of 2010, one rural locality in Sverdlovsk Oblast bears this name:

- Borisovsky, Sverdlovsk Oblast, a settlement under the administrative jurisdiction of the City of Nizhnyaya Tura

== Tver Oblast ==
As of 2010, three rural localities in Tver Oblast bear this name:

- Borisovsky, Tver Oblast, a settlement in Vyshnevolotsky District
- Borisovskoye, Kesovogorsky District, Tver Oblast, a selo in Kesovogorsky District
- Borisovskoye, Lesnoy District, Tver Oblast, a selo in Lesnoy District

== Vladimir Oblast ==
As of 2010, one rural locality in Vladimir Oblast bears this name:

- Borisovskoye, Vladimir Oblast, a selo in Suzdalsky District

== Volgograd Oblast ==
As of 2010, one rural locality in Volgograd Oblast bears this name:

- Borisovsky, Volgograd Oblast, a khutor in Staroanninsky Selsoviet of Novoanninsky District

== Vologda Oblast ==
As of 2010, five rural localities in Vologda Oblast bear this name:

- Borisovskaya, Kharovsky District, Vologda Oblast, a village in Shapshinsky Selsoviet of Kharovsky District
- Borisovskaya, Kirillovsky District, Vologda Oblast, a village in Ferapontovsky Selsoviet of Kirillovsky District
- Borisovskaya, Syamzhensky District, Vologda Oblast, a village in Korobitsinsky Selsoviet of Syamzhensky District
- Borisovskaya, Tarnogsky District, Vologda Oblast, a village in Verkhnekokshengsky Selsoviet of Tarnogsky District
- Borisovskaya, Verkhovazhsky District, Vologda Oblast, a village in Naumovsky Selsoviet of Verkhovazhsky District

== Yaroslavl Oblast ==
As of 2010, nine rural localities in Yaroslavl Oblast bear this name:

- Borisovskoye, Bolsheselsky District, Yaroslavl Oblast, a village in Blagoveshchensky Rural Okrug of Bolsheselsky District
- Borisovskoye, Borisoglebsky District, Yaroslavl Oblast, a selo in Ramensky Rural Okrug of Borisoglebsky District
- Borisovskoye, Lyubimsky District, Yaroslavl Oblast, a village in Osetsky Rural Okrug of Lyubimsky District
- Borisovskoye, Rostovsky District, Yaroslavl Oblast, a village in Sulostsky Rural Okrug of Rostovsky District
- Borisovskoye, Rybinsky District, Yaroslavl Oblast, a village in Mikhaylovsky Rural Okrug of Rybinsky District
- Borisovskoye, Tutayevsky District, Yaroslavl Oblast, a village in Fominsky Rural Okrug of Tutayevsky District
- Borisovskoye, Uglichsky District, Yaroslavl Oblast, a village in Ilyinsky Rural Okrug of Uglichsky District
- Borisovskaya, Myshkinsky District, Yaroslavl Oblast, a village in Arkhangelsky Rural Okrug of Myshkinsky District
- Borisovskaya, Nekrasovsky District, Yaroslavl Oblast, a village in Rodyukinsky Rural Okrug of Nekrasovsky District
