= Seslavskoye =

Seslavskoye Сеславское
- Selo
- Location within Vladimir Oblast Location within Russia
- Coordinates: 56°12′N 40°24′E
- Country: Russia
- Region: Vladimir Oblast
- District: Suzdalsky District
- Time zone: UTC+3:00

Seslavskoye (Russian: Сеславское) is a rural locality (a selo) in Pavlovskoye Rural Settlement, Suzdalsky District, Vladimir Oblast, Russia. The population was 36 as of 2010. There are 3 streets.

== Geography ==
Seslavskoye is located 26 km south of Suzdal (the district's administrative centre) by road. Sadovy is the nearest rural locality.
