= Grigorevo =

Grigorevo may refer to:

- Grigorevo (Vladimir Oblast) (Village in Vladimir Oblast, Russia)
- Grigorevo, Vologda Oblast (Village in Vologda Oblast, Russia)
