= Vypovo =

Vypovo Выпово
- Selo
- Location within Vladimir Oblast Location within Russia
- Coordinates: 56°17′N 40°21′E
- Country: Russia
- Region: Vladimir Oblast
- District: Suzdalsky District
- Time zone: UTC+3:00

Vypovo (Russian: Выпово) is a rural locality (a selo) in Pavlovskoye Rural Settlement, Suzdalsky District, Vladimir Oblast, Russia. The population was 67 as of 2010. There are 5 streets.

== Geography ==
Vypovo is located 18 km southwest of Suzdal (the district's administrative centre) by road. Tereneyevo is the nearest rural locality.
