= Novoalexandrovo =

Novoalexandrovo Новоалександрово
- Selo
- Location within Vladimir Oblast Location within Russia
- Coordinates: 56°13′N 40°15′E
- Country: Russia
- Region: Vladimir Oblast
- District: Suzdalsky District
- Time zone: UTC+3:00

Novoalexandrovo (Russian: Новоалександрово) is a rural locality (a selo) and the administrative center of Novoalexandrovskoye Rural Settlement, Suzdalsky District, Vladimir Oblast, Russia. The population was 1,219 as of 2010. There are 13 streets.

== Geography ==
Novoalexandrovo is located 35 km southwest of Suzdal (the district's administrative centre) by road. Olikovo is the nearest rural locality.
