= Ulovo =

Ulovo Улово
- Selo
- Location within Vladimir Oblast Location within Russia
- Coordinates: 56°18′N 40°31′E
- Country: Russia
- Region: Vladimir Oblast
- District: Suzdalsky District
- Time zone: UTC+3:00

Ulovo (Russian: Улово) is a rural locality (a selo) in Pavlovskoye Rural Settlement, Suzdalsky District, Vladimir Oblast, Russia. The population was 17 as of 2010. There are 10 streets.

== Geography ==
Ulovo is located on the Ulovka River, 26 km southeast of Suzdal (the district's administrative centre) by road. Poretskoye is the nearest rural locality.
