= Khotenskoye =

Khotenskoye Хотенское
- Selo
- Location within Vladimir Oblast Location within Russia
- Coordinates: 56°13′N 40°18′E
- Country: Russia
- Region: Vladimir Oblast
- District: Suzdalsky District
- Time zone: UTC+3:00

Khotenskoye (Russian: Хотенское) is a rural locality (a selo) in Novoalexandrovskoye Rural Settlement, Suzdalsky District, Vladimir Oblast, Russia. The population was 33 as of 2010. There are 2 streets.

== Geography ==
Khotenskoye is located 38 km southwest of Suzdal (the district's administrative centre) by road. Goritsy is the nearest rural locality.
