= Tsibeyevo =

Tsibeyevo Цибеево
- Selo
- Location within Vladimir Oblast Location within Russia
- Coordinates: 56°20′N 40°12′E
- Country: Russia
- Region: Vladimir Oblast
- District: Suzdalsky District
- Time zone: UTC+3:00

Tsibeyevo (Russian: Цибеево) is a rural locality (a selo) in Novoalexandrovskoye Rural Settlement, Suzdalsky District, Vladimir Oblast, Russia. The population was 480 as of 2010. There are 9 streets.

== Geography ==
Tsibeyevo is located 20 km southwest of Suzdal (the district's administrative centre) by road. Gubachevo is the nearest rural locality.
