= Bogoslovo =

Bogoslovo Богослово
- Selo
- Location within Vladimir Oblast Location within Russia
- Coordinates: 56°09′N 40°19′E
- Country: Russia
- Region: Vladimir Oblast
- District: Suzdalsky District
- Time zone: UTC+3:00

Bogoslovo (Russian: Богослово) is a rural locality (a selo) in Novoalexandrovskoye Rural Settlement, Suzdalsky District, Vladimir Oblast, Russia. The population was 367 as of 2010. There are 43 streets.

== Geography ==
Bogoslovo is located 39 km southwest of Suzdal (the district's administrative centre) by road. Zagorye is the nearest rural locality.
