= Borisovsky =

Borisovsky (masculine), Borisovskaya (feminine), or Borisovskoye (neuter) may refer to:

- Vadim Borisovsky (1900–1972), Russian/Soviet violist
- Borisovsky District, a district of Belgorod Oblast, Russia
- Borisovsky (rural locality) (Borisovskaya, Borisovskoye), name of several rural localities in Russia
- Borisovsky Khotilovo, an air base in Tver Oblast, Russia
