= Bogolyubka =

Bogolyubka Боголюбка
- Village
- Location within Vladimir Oblast Location within Russia
- Coordinates: 56°10′N 40°24′E
- Country: Russia
- Region: Vladimir Oblast
- District: Suzdalsky District
- Time zone: UTC+3:00

Bogolyubka (Russian: Боголюбка) is a rural locality (a village) in Novoalexandrovskoye Rural Settlement, Suzdalsky District, Vladimir Oblast, Russia. The population was 98 as of 2010. There are 2 streets.

== Geography ==
Bogolyubka is located on the Rpen River, 36 km south of Suzdal (the district's administrative centre) by road. Sushchevo is the nearest rural locality.
