= Yakimanskoye =

Yakimanskoye Якиманское
- Selo
- Location within Vladimir Oblast Location within Russia
- Coordinates: 56°20′N 40°31′E
- Country: Russia
- Region: Vladimir Oblast
- District: Suzdalsky District
- Time zone: UTC+3:00

Yakimanskoye (Russian: Якиманское) is a rural locality (a selo) in Pavlovskoye Rural Settlement, Suzdalsky District, Vladimir Oblast, Russia. The population was 7 as of 2010. There are 8 streets.

== Geography ==
Yakimanskoye is located on the Nerl River, 12 km southeast of Suzdal (the district's administrative centre) by road. Braskoye-Gorodishche is the nearest rural locality.

== History ==
During the Russian Empire, the town was part of the Vladimir Governorate.
