= Novaya Derevnya, Vladimir Oblast =

Novaya Derevnya Новая Деревня
- Village
- Location within Vladimir Oblast Location within Russia
- Coordinates: 56°16′N 40°14′E
- Country: Russia
- Region: Vladimir Oblast
- District: Suzdalsky District
- Time zone: UTC+3:00

Novaya Derevnya (Russian: Новая Деревня) is a rural locality (a village) in Novoalexandrovskoye Rural Settlement, Suzdalsky District, Vladimir Oblast, Russia. The population was 14 as of 2010. There are 3 streets.

== Geography ==
Novaya Derevnya is located 31 km southwest of Suzdal (the district's administrative centre) by road. Kutukovo is the nearest rural locality.
