= Tarbayevo =

Tarbayevo Тарбаево
- Selo
- Location within Vladimir Oblast Location within Russia
- Coordinates: 56°18′N 40°17′E
- Country: Russia
- Region: Vladimir Oblast
- District: Suzdalsky District
- Time zone: UTC+3:00

Tarbayevo (Russian: Тарбаево) is a rural locality (a selo) in Seletskoye Rural Settlement, Suzdalsky District, Vladimir Oblast, Russia. The population was 155 as of 2010. There are 3 streets.

== Geography ==
Tarbayevo is located 18 km southwest of Suzdal (the district's administrative centre) by road. Yanovets is the nearest rural locality.
