= Goloventsino =

Goloventsino Головенцино
- Selo
- Location within Vladimir Oblast Location within Russia
- Coordinates: 56°18′N 40°08′E
- Country: Russia
- Region: Vladimir Oblast
- District: Suzdalsky District
- Time zone: UTC+3:00

Goloventsino (Russian: Головенцино) is a rural locality (a selo) in Novoalexandrovskoye Rural Settlement, Suzdalsky District, Vladimir Oblast, Russia. The population was 6 as of 2010. There are 4 streets.

== Geography ==
Goloventsino is located 6 km southwest of Suzdal (the district's administrative centre) by road. Suzdal is the nearest rural locality.
