= Novokamenskoye =

Novokamenskoye Новокаменское
- Selo
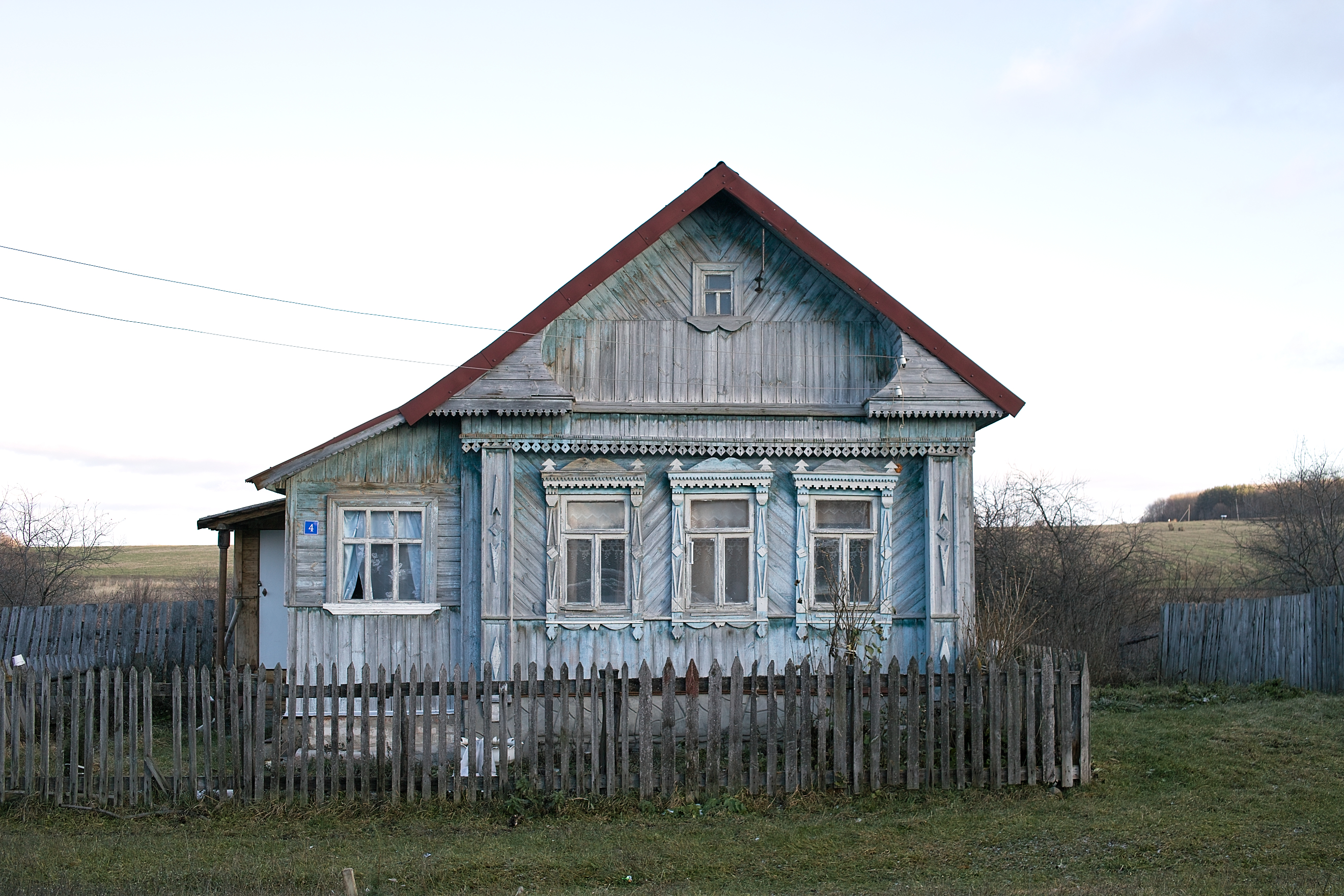

- Location within Vladimir Oblast Location within Russia
- Coordinates: 56°20′N 40°08′E
- Country: Russia
- Region: Vladimir Oblast
- District: Suzdalsky District
- Time zone: UTC+3:00

Novokamenskoye (Russian: Новокаменское) is a rural locality (a selo) in Novoalexandrovskoye Rural Settlement, Suzdalsky District, Vladimir Oblast, Russia. The population was 135 as of 2010. There are 5 streets.

== Geography ==
Novokamenskoye is located 23 km southwest of Suzdal (the district's administrative centre) by road. Tsibeyevo is the nearest rural locality.
