= Turtino =

Turtino Туртино
- Selo
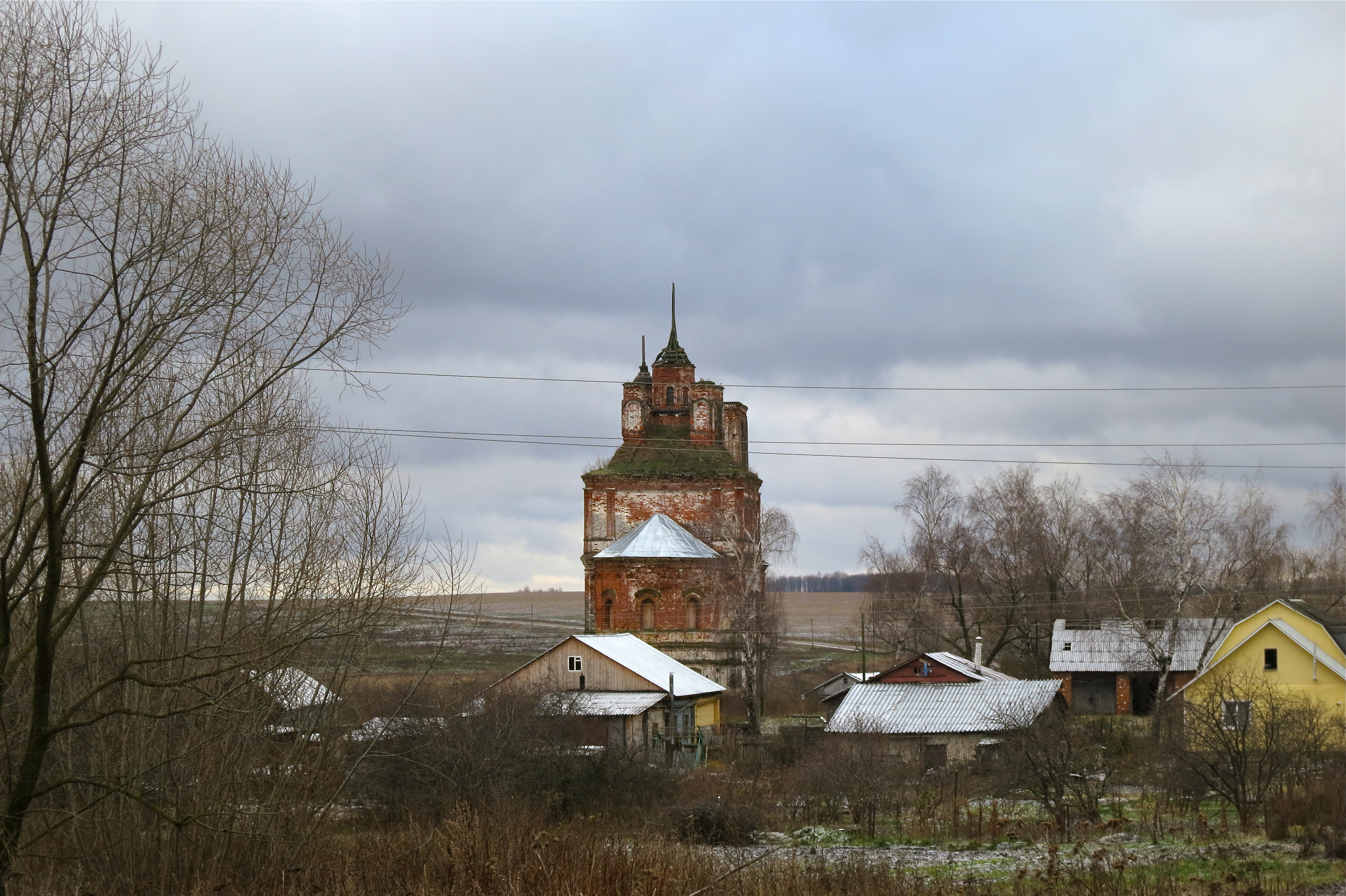
- The Church of St. John the Theologian in Turtino

- Location within Vladimir Oblast Location within Russia
- Coordinates: 56°20′N 40°19′E
- Country: Russia
- Region: Vladimir Oblast
- District: Suzdalsky District
- Time zone: UTC+3:00

Turtino (Russian: Туртино) is a rural locality (a selo) in Seletskoye Rural Settlement, Suzdalsky District, Vladimir Oblast, Russia. The population was 485 as of 2010. There are 3 streets.

== Geography ==
Turtino is located on the Bakaleyka River, 12 km southwest of Suzdal (the district's administrative centre) by road. Fedorovskoye is the nearest rural locality.
