= Kutukovo =

Kutukovo Кутуково
- Selo
- Location within Vladimir Oblast Location within Russia
- Coordinates: 56°15′N 40°13′E
- Country: Russia
- Region: Vladimir Oblast
- District: Suzdalsky District
- Time zone: UTC+3:00

Kutukovo (Russian: Кутуково) is a rural locality (a selo) in Novoalexandrovskoye Rural Settlement, Suzdalsky District, Vladimir Oblast, Russia. The population was 607 as of 2010. There are 12 streets.

== Geography ==
Kutukovo is located 29 km southwest of Suzdal (the district's administrative centre) by road. Novaya Derevnya is the nearest rural locality.
