= Obrashchikha, Suzdalsky District, Vladimir Oblast =

Obrashchikha Обращиха
- Selo
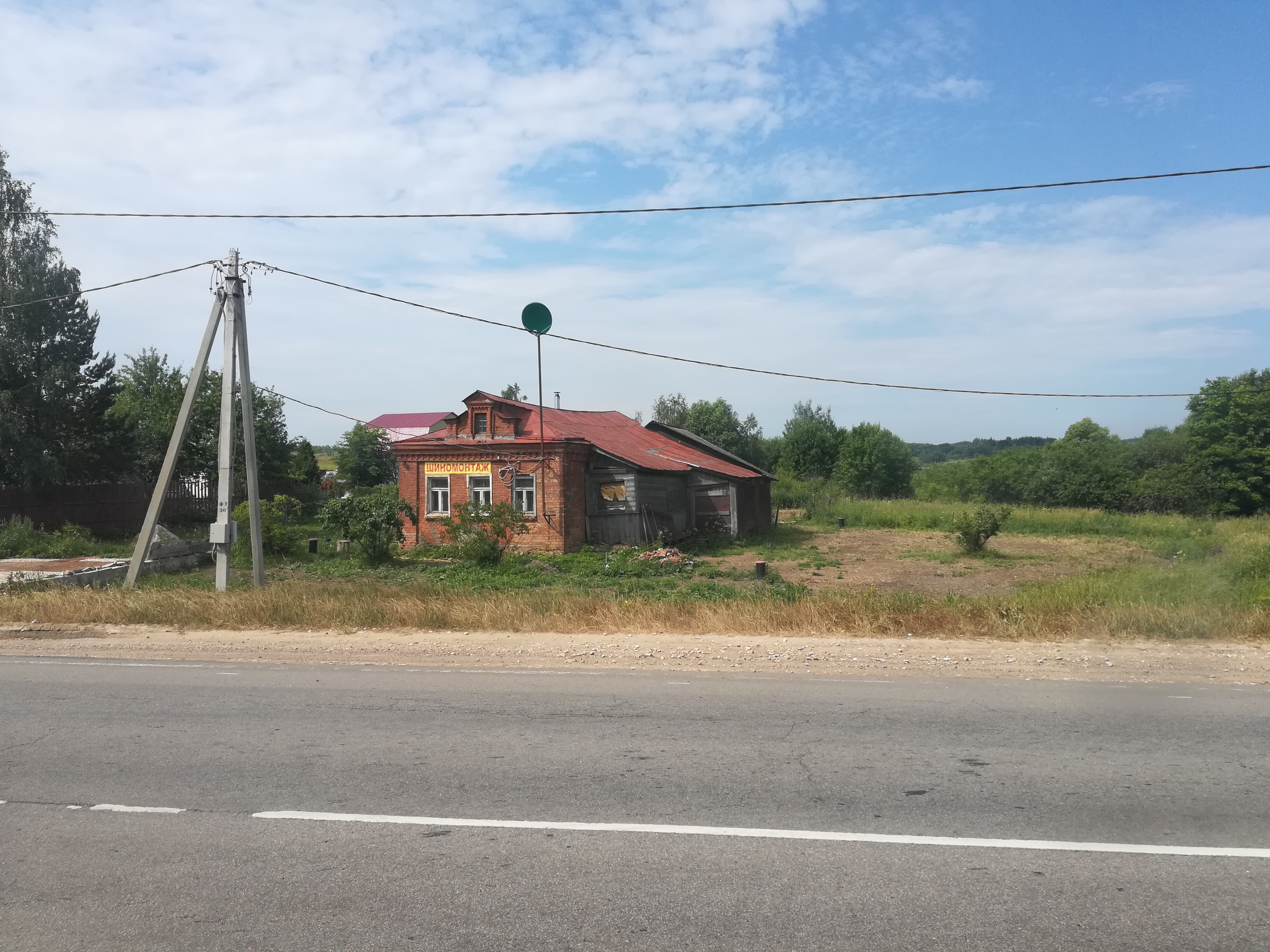
- image of obrashikha

- Location within Vladimir Oblast Location within Russia
- Coordinates: 56°19′N 40°07′E
- Country: Russia
- Region: Vladimir Oblast
- District: Suzdalsky District
- Time zone: UTC+3:00

Obrashchikha (Russian: Обращиха) is a rural locality (a selo) in Novoalexandrovskoye Rural Settlement, Suzdalsky District, Vladimir Oblast, Russia. The population was 87 as of 2010. There are 3 streets.

== Geography ==
Obrashchikha is located 26 km southwest of Suzdal (the district's administrative centre) by road. Novokamenskoye is the nearest rural locality.
