= Krasnoye Sushchyovo =

Krasnoye Sushchyovo Красное Сущёво
- Village
- Location within Vladimir Oblast Location within Russia
- Coordinates: 56°11′N 40°24′E
- Country: Russia
- Region: Vladimir Oblast
- District: Suzdalsky District
- Time zone: UTC+3:00

Krasnoye Sushchyovo (Russian: Красное Сущёво) is a rural locality (a village) in Novoalexandrovskoye Rural Settlement, Suzdalsky District, Vladimir Oblast, Russia. The population was 64 as of 2010. There are 6 streets.

== Geography ==
Krasnoye Sushchyovo is located on the Rpen River, 36 km south of Suzdal (the district's administrative centre) by road. Sushchyovo is the nearest rural locality.
