= Vnukovo, Suzdalsky District, Vladimir Oblast =

Vnukovo Внуково
- Village
- Location within Vladimir Oblast Location within Russia
- Coordinates: 56°12′N 40°13′E
- Country: Russia
- Region: Vladimir Oblast
- District: Suzdalsky District
- Time zone: UTC+3:00

Vnukovo (Russian: Внуково) is a rural locality (a village) in Novoalexandrovskoye Rural Settlement, Suzdalsky District, Vladimir Oblast, Russia. The population was 30 as of 2010. There are 7 streets.

== Geography ==
Vnukovo is located 38 km southwest of Suzdal (the district's administrative centre) by road. Malakhovo is the nearest rural locality.
