= Subbotino =

Subbotino Субботино
- Village
- Location within Vladimir Oblast Location within Russia
- Coordinates: 56°32′N 40°36′E
- Country: Russia
- Region: Vladimir Oblast
- District: Suzdalsky District
- Time zone: UTC+3:00

Subbotino (Russian: Субботино) is a rural locality (a village) in Seletskoye Rural Settlement, Suzdalsky District, Vladimir Oblast, Russia. The population was 2 as of 2010.

== Geography ==
Subbotino is located on the Beryozka River, 24 km northeast of Suzdal (the district's administrative centre) by road. Bolshoye Borisovo is the nearest rural locality.
