= Zagorye, Suzdalsky District, Vladimir Oblast =

Zagorye Загорье
- Village
- Location within Vladimir Oblast Location within Russia
- Coordinates: 56°09′N 40°18′E
- Country: Russia
- Region: Vladimir Oblast
- District: Suzdalsky District
- Time zone: UTC+3:00

Zagorye (Russian: Загорье) is a rural locality (a village) in Novoalexandrovskoye Rural Settlement, Suzdalsky District, Vladimir Oblast, Russia. The population was 12 as of 2010. There are 5 streets.

== Geography ==
Zagorye is located 42 km southwest of Suzdal (the district's administrative centre) by road. Bogoslovo is the nearest rural locality.
