= Voskresenskaya Slobodka =

Voskresenskaya Slobodka Воскресенская Слободка
- Selo
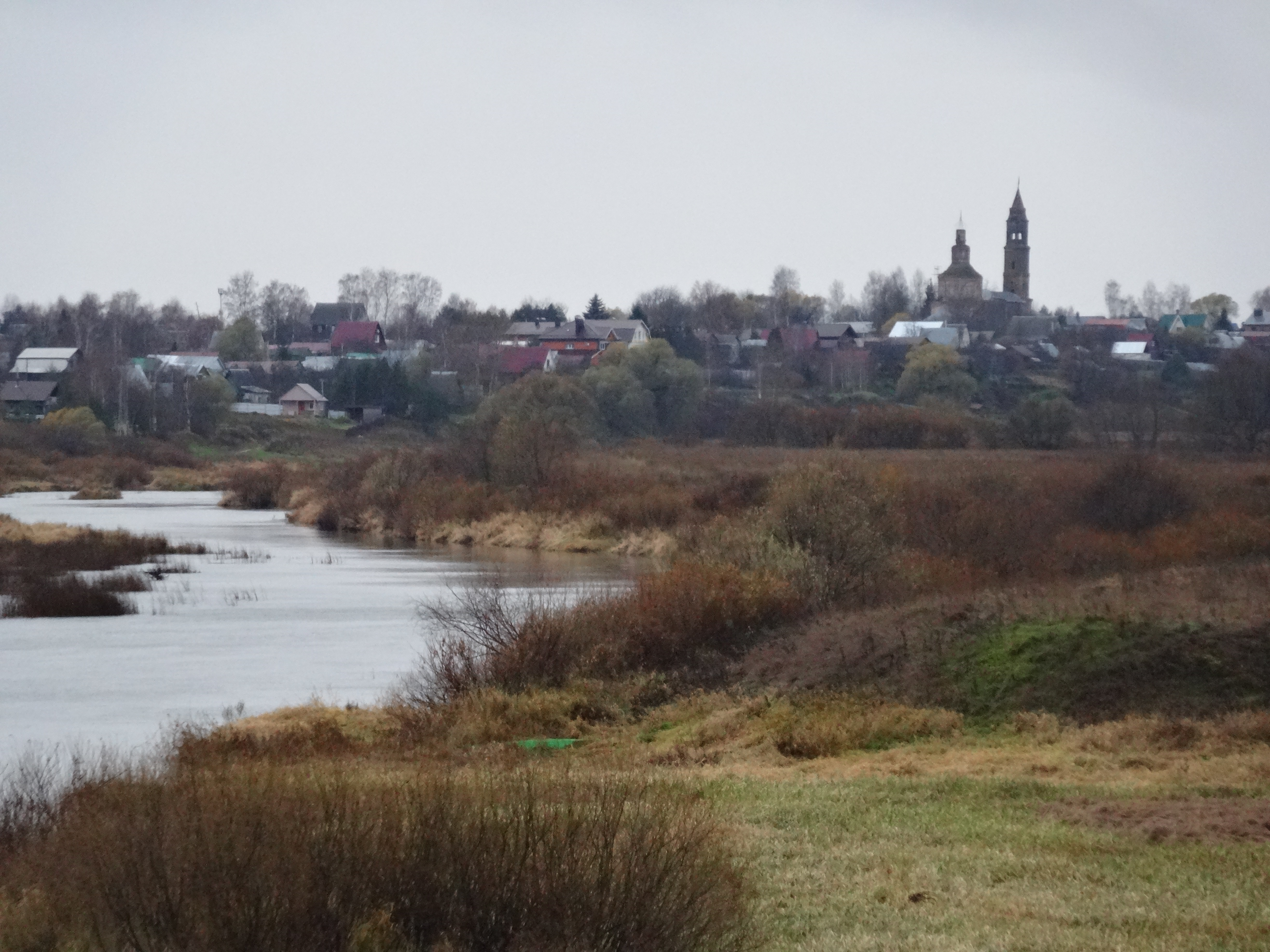

- Location within Vladimir Oblast Location within Russia
- Coordinates: 56°19′N 40°38′E
- Country: Russia
- Region: Vladimir Oblast
- District: Suzdalsky District
- Time zone: UTC+3:00

Voskresenskaya Slobodka (Russian: Воскресенская Слободка) is a rural locality (a selo) in Pavlovskoye Rural Settlement, Suzdalsky District, Vladimir Oblast, Russia. The population was 23 as of 2010. There are 5 streets.

== Geography ==
Voskresenskaya Slobodka is located on the right bank of the Nerl River, 32 km southeast of Suzdal (the district's administrative centre) by road. Mordysh is the nearest rural locality.
