= Malo-Boriskovo =

Malo-Boriskovo Мало-Борисково
- Selo
- Location within Vladimir Oblast Location within Russia
- Coordinates: 56°29′N 40°29′E
- Country: Russia
- Region: Vladimir Oblast
- District: Suzdalsky District
- Time zone: UTC+3:00

Malo-Boriskovo (Russian: Мало-Борисково) is a rural locality (a selo) in Seletskoye Rural Settlement, Suzdalsky District, Vladimir Oblast, Russia. The population was 12 as of 2010.

== Geography ==
Malo-Boriskovo is located 11 km northeast of Suzdal (the district's administrative centre) by road. Khlamovo is the nearest rural locality.
