= Kistysh =

Kistysh Кистыш
- Selo
- Location within Vladimir Oblast Location within Russia
- Coordinates: 56°28′N 40°16′E
- Country: Russia
- Region: Vladimir Oblast
- District: Suzdalsky District
- Time zone: UTC+3:00

Kistysh (Russian: Кистыш) is a rural locality (a selo) in Seletskoye Rural Settlement, Suzdalsky District, Vladimir Oblast, Russia. The population was 50 as of 2010. There are 6 streets.

== Geography ==
Kistysh is located on the Kestra River, 15 km northwest of Suzdal (the district's administrative centre) by road. Vishenki is the nearest rural locality.
