= Bolshoye Borisovo =

Bolshoye Borisovo Большое Борисово
- Selo
- Location within Vladimir Oblast Location within Russia
- Coordinates: 56°33′N 40°36′E
- Country: Russia
- Region: Vladimir Oblast
- District: Suzdalsky District
- Time zone: UTC+3:00

Bolshoye Borisovo (Russian: Большое Борисово) is a rural locality (a selo) in Seletskoye Rural Settlement, Suzdalsky District, Vladimir Oblast, Russia. The population was 112 as of 2010. There are 5 streets.

== Geography ==
Bolshoye Borisovo is located 23 km northeast of Suzdal (the district's administrative centre) by road. Subbotino is the nearest rural locality.
