= Teremets =

Teremets Теремец
- Village
- Location within Vladimir Oblast Location within Russia
- Coordinates: 56°15′N 40°10′E
- Country: Russia
- Region: Vladimir Oblast
- District: Suzdalsky District
- Time zone: UTC+3:00

Teremets (Russian: Теремец) is a rural locality (a village) in Novoalexandrovskoye Rural Settlement, Suzdalsky District, Vladimir Oblast, Russia. The population was 3 as of 2010.

== Geography ==
Teremets is located 31 km southwest of Suzdal (the district's administrative centre) by road. Kutukovo is the nearest rural locality.
