= Barskoye-Gorodishche =

Barskoye-Gorodishche Барское-Городище
- Selo
- Location within Vladimir Oblast Location within Russia
- Coordinates: 56°21′N 40°30′E
- Country: Russia
- Region: Vladimir Oblast
- District: Suzdalsky District
- Time zone: UTC+3:00

Barskoye-Gorodishche (Russian: Барское-Городище) is a rural locality (a selo) in Pavlovskoye Rural Settlement, Suzdalsky District, Vladimir Oblast, Russia. The population was 252 as of 2010. There are six streets.

== Geography ==
Barskoye-Gorodishche is located on the right bank of the Nerl River, 11 km southeast of Suzdal (the district's administrative centre) by road. Yakimanskoye is the nearest rural locality.
