= Tereneyevo =

Tereneyevo Теренеево
- Selo
- Location within Vladimir Oblast Location within Russia
- Coordinates: 56°19′N 40°25′E
- Country: Russia
- Region: Vladimir Oblast
- District: Suzdalsky District
- Time zone: UTC+3:00

Tereneyevo (Russian: Теренеево) is a rural locality (a selo) in Pavlovskoye Rural Settlement, Suzdalsky District, Vladimir Oblast, Russia. The population was 17 as of 2010. There are 4 streets.

== Geography ==
Tereneyevo is located 15 km south of Suzdal (the district's administrative centre) by road. Semyonovskoye-Krasnoye is the nearest rural locality.
