= Dorzhevo =

Dorzhevo Доржево
- Village
- Location within Vladimir Oblast Location within Russia
- Coordinates: 56°14′N 40°37′E
- Country: Russia
- Region: Vladimir Oblast
- District: Suzdalsky District
- Time zone: UTC+3:00

Dorzhevo (Russian: Доржево) is a rural locality (a village) in Bogolyubovskoye Rural Settlement, Suzdalsky District, Vladimir Oblast, Russia. The population was 10 as of 2010.

== Geography ==
Dorzhevo is located 45 km southeast of Suzdal (the district's administrative centre) by road. Vyselki is the nearest rural locality.
