= Stary Dvor =

Stary Dvor Старый Двор
- Selo
- Location within Vladimir Oblast Location within Russia
- Coordinates: 56°17′N 40°10′E
- Country: Russia
- Region: Vladimir Oblast
- District: Suzdalsky District
- Time zone: UTC+3:00

Stary Dvor (Russian: Старый Двор) is a rural locality (a selo) in Novoalexandrovskoye Rural Settlement, Suzdalsky District, Vladimir Oblast, Russia. The population was 775 as of 2010. There are 11 streets.

== Geography ==
Stary Dvor is located 25 km southwest of Suzdal (the district's administrative centre) by road. Vorontsovo is the nearest rural locality.
