= Oslavskoye =

Oslavskoye Ославское
- Selo
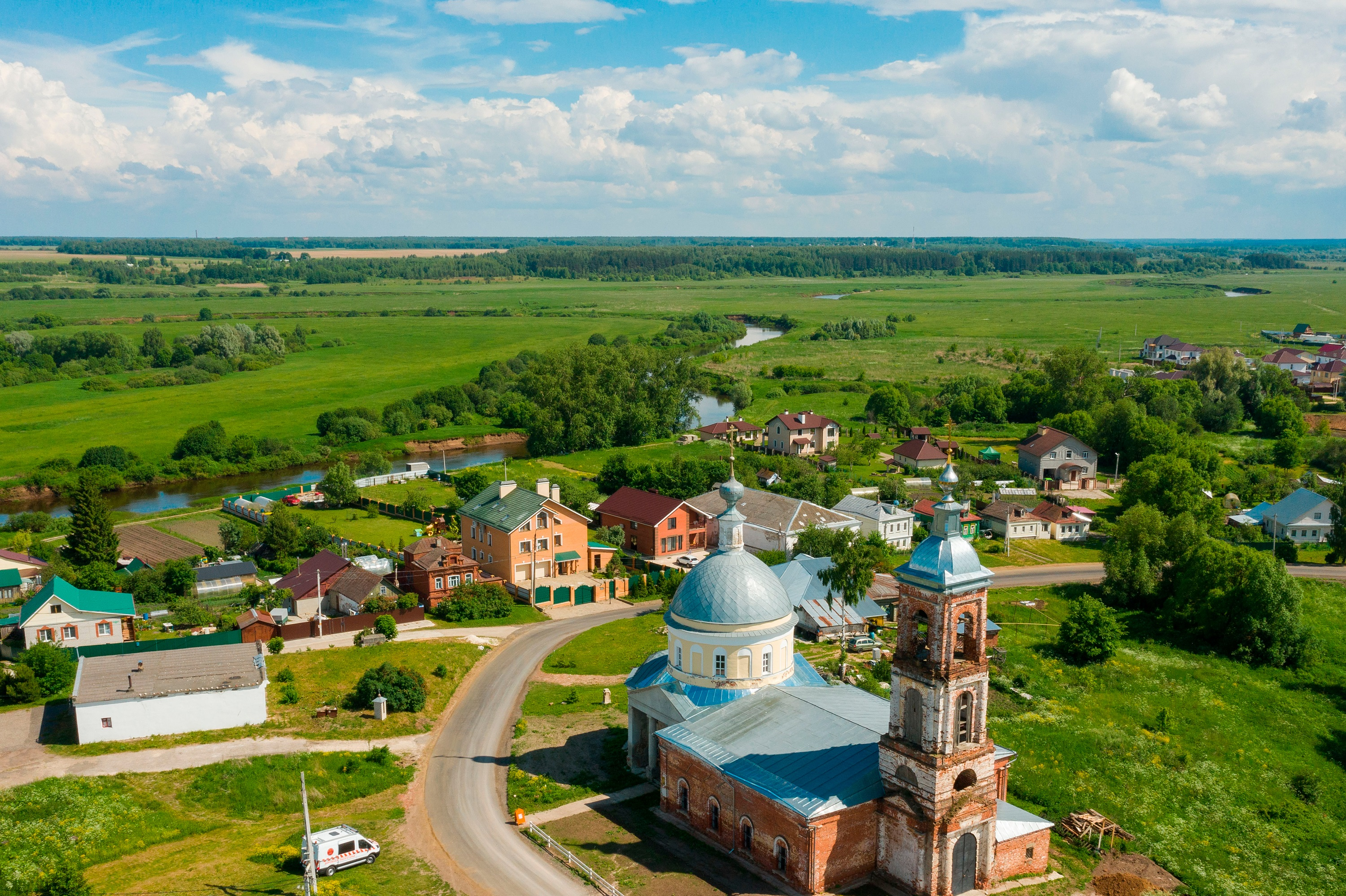
- Oslavskoye

- Location within Vladimir Oblast Location within Russia
- Coordinates: 56°13′N 40°31′E
- Country: Russia
- Region: Vladimir Oblast
- District: Suzdalsky District
- Time zone: UTC+3:00

Oslavskoye (Russian: Ославское) is a rural locality (a selo) in Bogolyubovskoye Rural Settlement, Suzdalsky District, Vladimir Oblast, Russia. The population was 336 as of 2010. There are 36 streets.

== Geography ==
Oslavskoye is located on the right bank of the Nerl River, 39 km southeast of Suzdal (the district's administrative centre) by road. Novoye is the nearest rural locality.
