= Sokol, Vladimir Oblast =

Sokol Сокол
- Settlement
- Location within Vladimir Oblast Location within Russia
- Coordinates: 56°15′N 40°33′E
- Country: Russia
- Region: Vladimir Oblast
- District: Suzdalsky District
- Time zone: UTC+3:00

Sokol (Russian: Сокол) is a rural locality (a settlement) in Bogolyubovskoye Rural Settlement, Suzdalsky District, Vladimir Oblast, Russia. The population was 1,486 as of 2010. There are 8 streets.

== Geography ==
Sokol is located on the Nerl River, 43 km southeast of Suzdal (the district's administrative centre) by road. Dobrynskoye is the nearest rural locality.
