= Yanyovo =

Yanyovo Янёво
- Selo
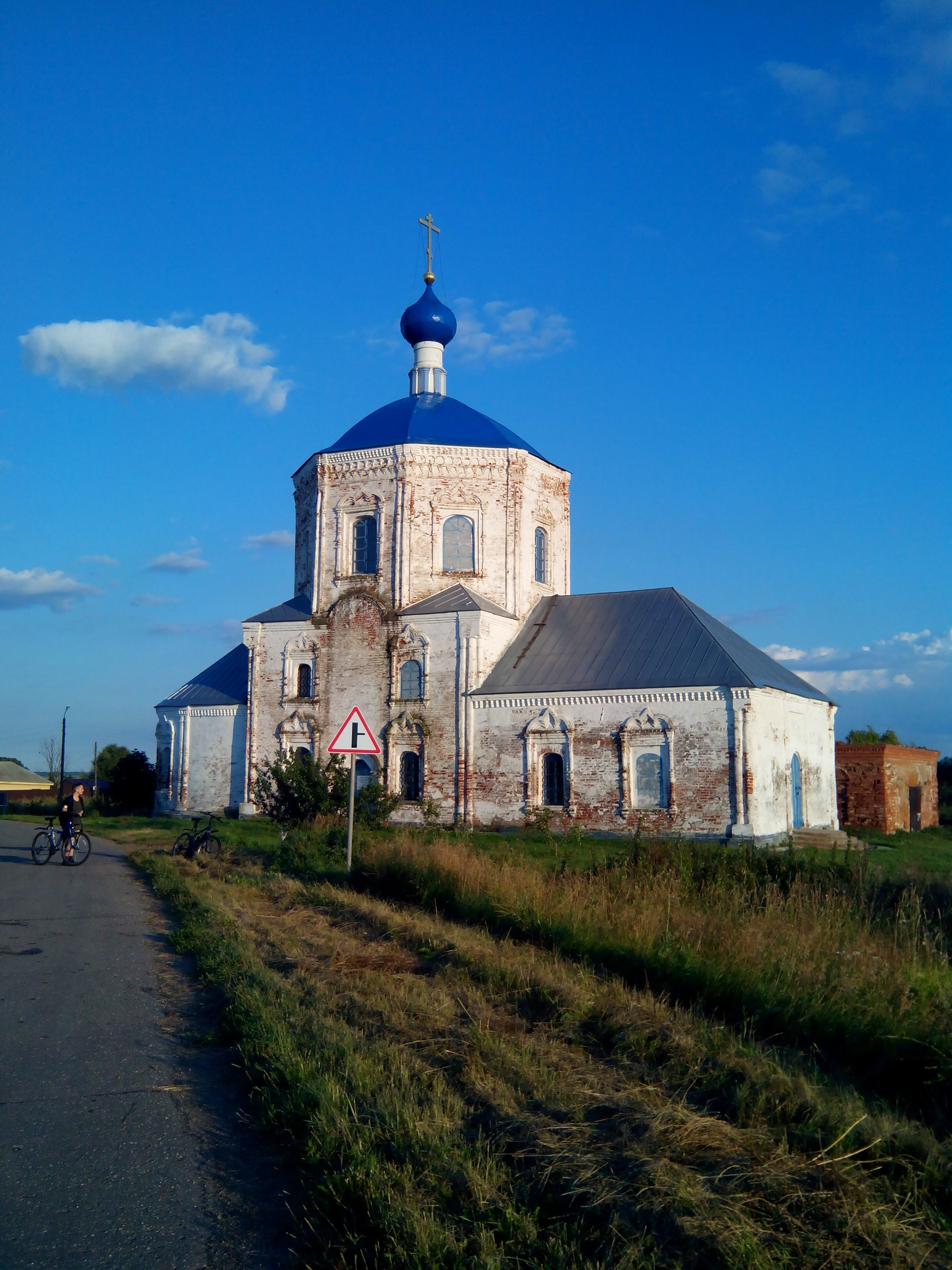
- Church of the Kazan Icon of the Mother of God, Yanyovo, 2016

- Location within Vladimir Oblast Location within Russia
- Coordinates: 56°25′N 40°19′E
- Country: Russia
- Region: Vladimir Oblast
- District: Suzdalsky District
- Time zone: UTC+3:00

Yanyovo (Russian: Янёво) is a rural locality (a selo) in Seletskoye Rural Settlement, Suzdalsky District, Vladimir Oblast, Russia. The population was 90 as of 2010. There are 6 streets.

== Geography ==
Yanyovo is located 9 km west of Suzdal (the district's administrative centre) by road. Krapivye is the nearest rural locality.
