= Alferikha =

Alferikha Алфериха
- Village
- Location within Vladimir Oblast Location within Russia
- Coordinates: 56°28′N 40°33′E
- Country: Russia
- Region: Vladimir Oblast
- District: Suzdalsky District
- Time zone: UTC+3:00

Alferikha (Russian: Алфериха) is a rural locality (a village) in Seletskoye Rural Settlement, Suzdalsky District, Vladimir Oblast, Russia. The population was 7 as of 2010.

== Geography ==
Alferikha is located 15 km northeast of Suzdal (the district's administrative centre) by road. Pogost-Bykovo is the nearest rural locality.
