= Lopatnitsy =

Lopatnitsy Лопатницы
- Selo
- Location within Vladimir Oblast Location within Russia
- Coordinates: 56°30′N 40°33′E
- Country: Russia
- Region: Vladimir Oblast
- District: Suzdalsky District
- Time zone: UTC+3:00

Lopatnitsy (Russian: Лопатницы) is a rural locality (a selo) in Seletskoye Rural Settlement, Suzdalsky District, Vladimir Oblast, Russia. The population was 235 as of 2010. There are 3 streets.

== Geography ==
Lopatnitsy is located on the Podeks River, 15 km northeast of Suzdal (the district's administrative centre) by road. Krasnogvardeysky is the nearest rural locality.
