= Nikulskoye =

Nikulskoye Никульское
- Selo
- Location within Vladimir Oblast Location within Russia
- Coordinates: 56°17′N 40°06′E
- Country: Russia
- Region: Vladimir Oblast
- District: Suzdalsky District
- Time zone: UTC+3:00

Nikulskoye (Russian: Никульское) is a rural locality (a selo) in Novoalexandrovskoye Rural Settlement, Suzdalsky District, Vladimir Oblast, Russia. The population was 42 as of 2010. There are 5 streets.

== Geography ==
Nikulskoye is located 31 km southwest of Suzdal (the district's administrative centre) by road. Klementyevo is the nearest rural locality.
