= Sodyshka =

Sodyshka Содышка
- Settlement
- Location within Vladimir Oblast Location within Russia
- Coordinates: 56°11′N 40°23′E
- Country: Russia
- Region: Vladimir Oblast
- District: Suzdalsky District
- Time zone: UTC+3:00

Sodyshka (Russian: Содышка) is a rural locality (a settlement) in Novoalexandrovskoye Rural Settlement, Suzdalsky District, Vladimir Oblast, Russia. The population was 949 as of 2010. There are 3 streets.

== Geography ==
Sodyshka is located on the Rpen River, 36 km south of Suzdal (the district's administrative centre) by road. Krasnoye Sushchevo is the nearest rural locality.
