= Klementyevo, Suzdalsky District, Vladimir Oblast =

Klementyevo Клементьево
- Selo
- Location within Vladimir Oblast Location within Russia
- Coordinates: 56°16′N 40°07′E
- Country: Russia
- Region: Vladimir Oblast
- District: Suzdalsky District
- Time zone: UTC+3:00

Klementyevo (Russian: Клементьево) is a rural locality (a selo) in Novoalexandrovskoye Rural Settlement, Suzdalsky District, Vladimir Oblast, Russia. The population was 512 as of 2010. There are 15 streets.

== Geography ==
Klementyevo is located 30 km southwest of Suzdal (the district's administrative centre) by road. Nikulskoye is the nearest rural locality.
