= Babarino =

Babarino Бабарино
- Village
- Location within Vladimir Oblast Location within Russia
- Coordinates: 56°22′N 40°34′E
- Country: Russia
- Region: Vladimir Oblast
- District: Suzdalsky District
- Time zone: UTC+3:00

Babarino (Russian: Бабарино) is a rural locality (a village) in Seletskoye Rural Settlement, Suzdalsky District, Vladimir Oblast, Russia. The population was 3 as of 2010.

== Geography ==
Babarino is located on the left bank of the Nerl River, 16 km southeast of Suzdal (the district's administrative centre) by road. Pereborovo is the nearest rural locality.
