= Suvorotskoye =

Suvorotskoye Суворотское
- Selo
- Location within Vladimir Oblast Location within Russia
- Coordinates: 56°13′N 40°27′E
- Country: Russia
- Region: Vladimir Oblast
- District: Suzdalsky District
- Time zone: UTC+3:00

Suvorotskoye (Russian: Суворотское) is a rural locality (a selo) in Bogolyubovskoye Rural Settlement, Suzdalsky District, Vladimir Oblast, Russia. The population was 178 as of 2010. There are 22 streets.

== Geography ==
Suvorotskoye is located 24 km south of Suzdal (the district's administrative centre) by road. Sadovy is the nearest rural locality.
