= Kibol =

Kibol Кибол
- Selo
- Location within Vladimir Oblast Location within Russia
- Coordinates: 56°26′N 40°23′E
- Country: Russia
- Region: Vladimir Oblast
- District: Suzdalsky District
- Time zone: UTC+3:00

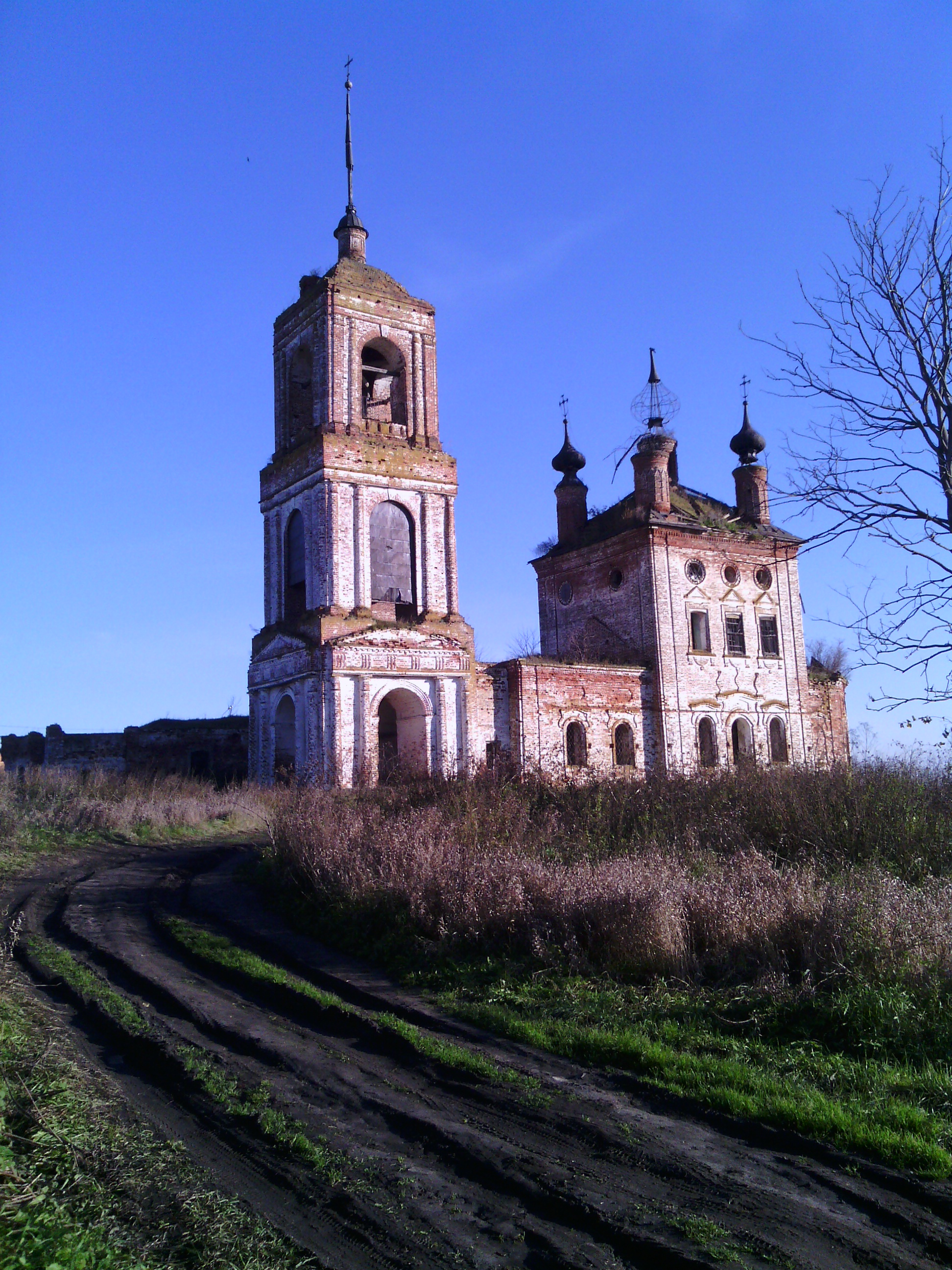

Kibol (Russian: Кибол) is a rural locality (a selo) in Seletskoye Rural Settlement, Suzdalsky District, Vladimir Oblast, Russia. The population was 8 as of 2010. There are 3 streets.

== Geography ==
Kibol is located on the Kamenka River, 6 km northwest of Suzdal (the district's administrative centre) by road. Suzdal is the nearest rural locality.
