= Drovniki =

Drovniki Дровники
- Village
- Location within Vladimir Oblast Location within Russia
- Coordinates: 56°22′N 40°37′E
- Country: Russia
- Region: Vladimir Oblast
- District: Suzdalsky District
- Time zone: UTC+3:00

Drovniki (Russian: Дровники) is a rural locality (a village) in Seletskoye Rural Settlement, Suzdalsky District, Vladimir Oblast, Russia. The population was 2 as of 2010.

== Geography ==
Drovniki is located 18 km southeast of Suzdal (the district's administrative centre) by road. Pesochnoye is the nearest rural locality.
