= Menchakovo =

Menchakovo Менчаково
- Selo
- Location within Vladimir Oblast Location within Russia
- Coordinates: 56°30′N 40°23′E
- Country: Russia
- Region: Vladimir Oblast
- District: Suzdalsky District
- Time zone: UTC+3:00

“Church of the Nativity of the Mother of God” in the village of Menchakovo

Menchakovo (Russian: Менчаково) is a rural locality (a selo) in Seletskoye Rural Settlement, Suzdalsky District, Vladimir Oblast, Russia. The population was 88 as of 2010. There are 4 streets.

== Geography ==
Menchakovo is located on the Irmes River, 10 km northwest of Suzdal (the district's administrative centre) by road. Romanovo is the nearest rural locality.
