= Maslenka =

Maslenka Масленка
- Village
- Location within Vladimir Oblast Location within Russia
- Coordinates: 56°11′N 40°19′E
- Country: Russia
- Region: Vladimir Oblast
- District: Suzdalsky District
- Time zone: UTC+3:00

Maslenka (Russian: Масленка) is a rural locality (a village) in Novoalexandrovskoye Rural Settlement, Suzdalsky District, Vladimir Oblast, Russia. The population was 4 as of 2010. There are 3 streets.

== Geography ==
Maslenka is located 41 km southwest of Suzdal (the district's administrative centre) by road. Zeleni is the nearest rural locality.
