= Suromna =

Suromna Суромна
- Selo
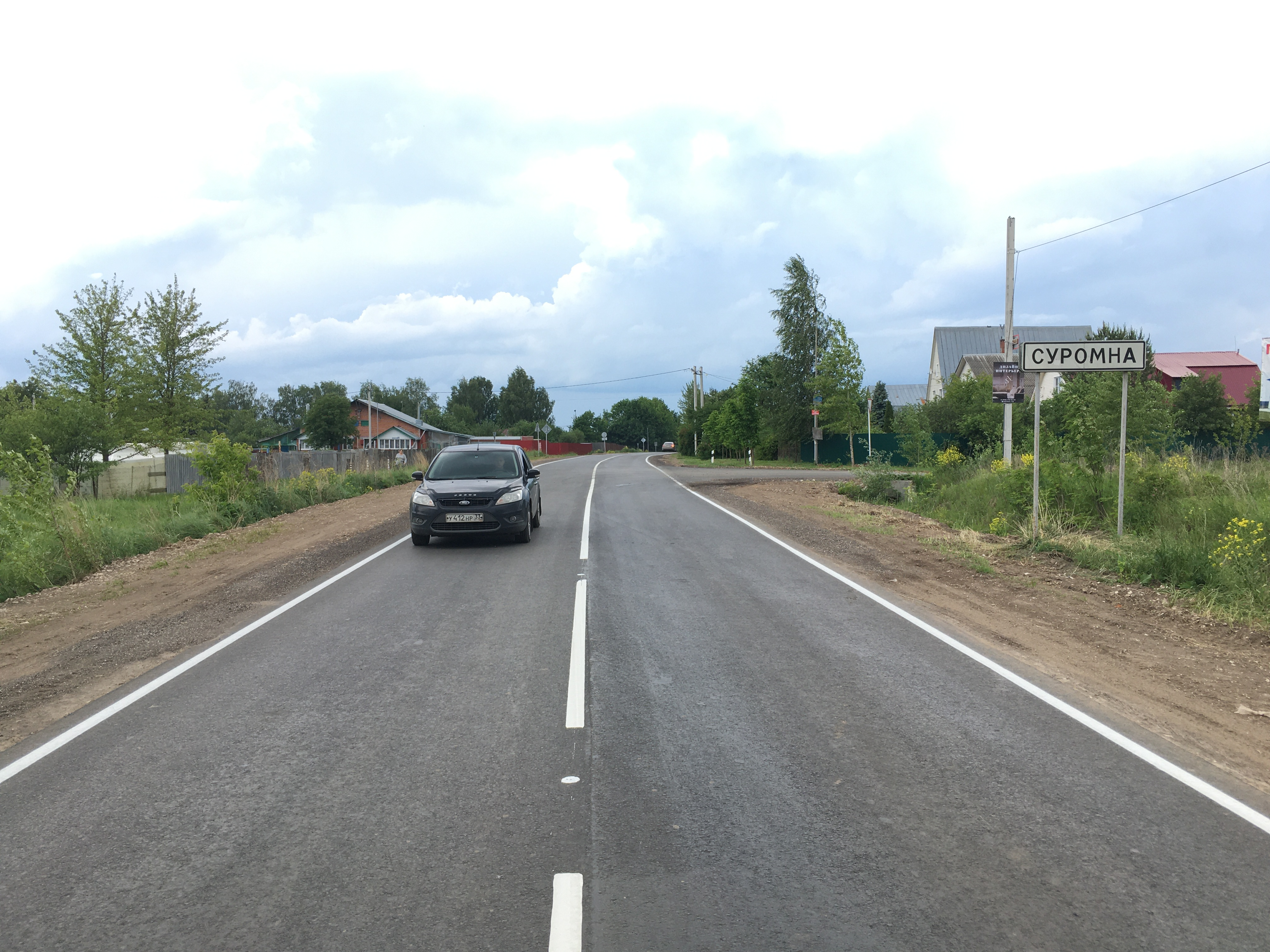

- Location within Vladimir Oblast Location within Russia
- Coordinates: 56°11′N 40°29′E
- Country: Russia
- Region: Vladimir Oblast
- District: Suzdalsky District
- Time zone: UTC+3:00

Suromna (Russian: Суромна) is a rural locality, or a selo, in Bogolyubovskoye Rural Settlement, Suzdalsky District, Vladimir Oblast, Russia. The population was 646 as of 2010. There are 32 streets.

== Geography ==
Suromna is located on the Sungir River, 34 km south of Suzdal (the district's administrative centre) by road. Bogolyubovo is the nearest rural locality.
