= Seltso, Vladimir Oblast =

Seltso Сельцо
- Selo
- Location within Vladimir Oblast Location within Russia
- Coordinates: 56°25′N 40°24′E
- Country: Russia
- Region: Vladimir Oblast
- District: Suzdalsky District
- Time zone: UTC+3:00

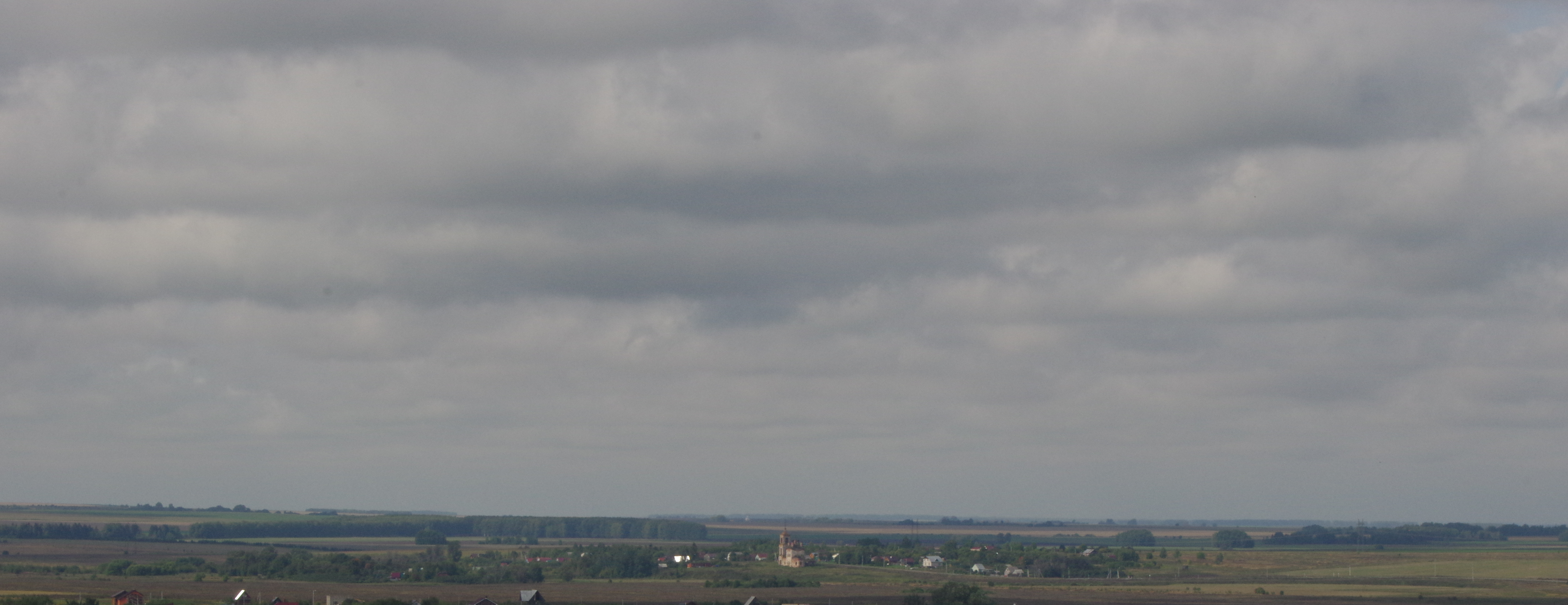
View of Setlso from Suzdal

Seltso (Russian: Сельцо) is a rural locality (a selo) in Seletskoye Rural Settlement, Suzdalsky District, Vladimir Oblast, Russia. The population was 283 as of 2010. There are 6 streets.

== Geography ==
Seltso is located on the Kamenka River, 3 km west of Suzdal (the district's administrative centre) by road. Novy is the nearest rural locality.
