= Sadovy, Vladimir Oblast =

Sadovy Садовый
- Settlement
- Location within Vladimir Oblast Location within Russia
- Coordinates: 56°13′N 40°24′E
- Country: Russia
- Region: Vladimir Oblast
- District: Suzdalsky District
- Time zone: UTC+3:00

Sadovy (Russian: Садовый) is a rural locality (a settlement) in Pavlovskoye Rural Settlement, Suzdalsky District, Vladimir Oblast, Russia. The population was 2,079 as of 2010. There are 27 streets.

== Geography ==
Sadovy is located 25 km south of Suzdal (the district's administrative centre) by road. Brodnitsy is the nearest rural locality.
