= Pogost-Bykovo =

Pogost-Bykovo Погост-Быково
- Selo
- Location within Vladimir Oblast Location within Russia
- Coordinates: 56°28′N 40°33′E
- Country: Russia
- Region: Vladimir Oblast
- District: Suzdalsky District
- Time zone: UTC+3:00

Pogost-Bykovo (Russian: Погост-Быково) is a rural locality (a selo) in Seletskoye Rural Settlement, Suzdalsky District, Vladimir Oblast, Russia. The population was 12 as of 2010. There are 2 streets.

== Geography ==
Pogost-Bykovo is located 15 km northeast of Suzdal (the district's administrative centre) by road. Alferikha is the nearest rural locality.
