= Torchino =

Torchino Торчино
- Selo
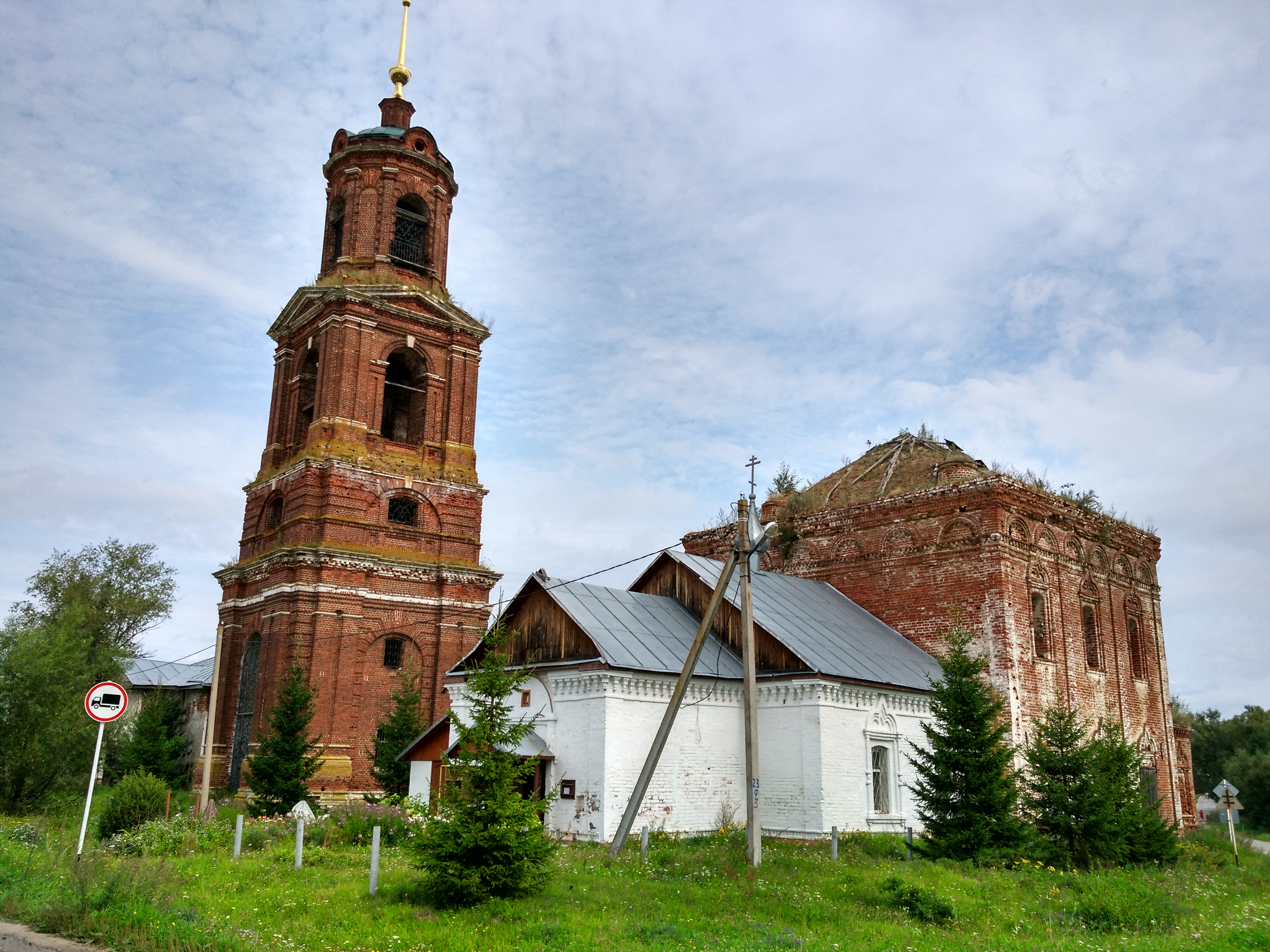

- Location within Vladimir Oblast Location within Russia
- Coordinates: 56°33′N 40°33′E
- Country: Russia
- Region: Vladimir Oblast
- District: Suzdalsky District
- Time zone: UTC+3:00

Torchino (Russian: То́рчино) is a rural locality (a selo) in Seletskoye Rural Settlement, Suzdalsky District, Vladimir Oblast, Russia. The population was 551 as of 2010. There are eight streets.

== Geography ==
Torchino is located 19 km northeast of Suzdal (the district's administrative centre) by road. Teterino is the nearest rural locality.
