= Malakhovo, Suzdalsky District, Vladimir Oblast =

Malakhovo Малахово
- Selo
- Location within Vladimir Oblast Location within Russia
- Coordinates: 56°12′N 40°11′E
- Country: Russia
- Region: Vladimir Oblast
- District: Suzdalsky District
- Time zone: UTC+3:00

Malakhovo (Russian: Малахово) is a rural locality (a selo) in Novoalexandrovskoye Rural Settlement, Suzdalsky District, Vladimir Oblast, Russia. The population was 38 as of 2010. There are 5 streets.

== Geography ==
Malakhovo is located on the Kolochka River, 41 km southwest of Suzdal (the district's administrative centre) by road. Smolino is the nearest rural locality.
