= Gridino, Suzdalsky District, Vladimir Oblast =

Gridino Гридино
- Village
- Location within Vladimir Oblast Location within Russia
- Coordinates: 56°28′N 40°36′E
- Country: Russia
- Region: Vladimir Oblast
- District: Suzdalsky District
- Time zone: UTC+3:00

Gridino (Russian: Гридино) is a rural locality (a village) in Seletskoye Rural Settlement, Suzdalsky District, Vladimir Oblast, Russia. The population was 9 as of 2010. There are 2 streets.

== Geography ==
Gridino is located 18 km northeast of Suzdal (the district's administrative centre) by road. Malakhovo is the nearest rural locality.
