= Mordysh =

Mordysh Мордыш
- Selo
- Location within Vladimir Oblast Location within Russia
- Coordinates: 56°18′N 40°36′E
- Country: Russia
- Region: Vladimir Oblast
- District: Suzdalsky District
- Time zone: UTC+3:00

Mordysh (Russian: Мордыш) is a rural locality (a selo) in Pavlovskoye Rural Settlement, Suzdalsky District, Vladimir Oblast, Russia. The population was 545 as of 2010. There are 21 streets.

== Geography ==
Mordysh is located on the right bank of the Nerl River, 30 km (19 mi) southeast of Suzdal (the district's administrative centre) by road. Zapolitsy is the nearest rural locality.
