= Gubachevo =

Gubachevo Губачево
- Village
- Location within Vladimir Oblast Location within Russia
- Coordinates: 56°21′N 40°12′E
- Country: Russia
- Region: Vladimir Oblast
- District: Suzdalsky District
- Time zone: UTC+3:00

Gubachevo (Russian: Губачево) is a rural locality (a village) in Novoalexandrovskoye Rural Settlement, Suzdalsky District, Vladimir Oblast, Russia. The population was 6 as of 2010.

== Geography ==
Gubachevo is located on the Kamenka River, 18 km southwest of Suzdal (the district's administrative centre) by road. Tsibeyevo is the nearest rural locality.
