= Pantelikha =

Pantelikha Пантелиха
- Village
- Location within Vladimir Oblast Location within Russia
- Coordinates: 56°30′N 40°25′E
- Country: Russia
- Region: Vladimir Oblast
- District: Suzdalsky District
- Time zone: UTC+3:00

Pantelikha (Russian: Пантелиха) is a rural locality (a village) in Seletskoye Rural Settlement, Suzdalsky District, Vladimir Oblast, Russia. The population was 11 as of 2010.

== Geography ==
Pantelikha is located between Nerl and Irmes Rivers, 13 km north of Suzdal (the district's administrative centre) by road. Omutskoye is the nearest rural locality.
