= Viltsovo =

Viltsovo Вильцово
- Village
- Location within Vladimir Oblast Location within Russia
- Coordinates: 56°35′N 40°33′E
- Country: Russia
- Region: Vladimir Oblast
- District: Suzdalsky District
- Time zone: UTC+3:00

Viltsovo (Russian: Вильцово) is a rural locality (a village) in Seletskoye Rural Settlement, Suzdalsky District, Vladimir Oblast, Russia. The population was 10 as of 2010. There are 2 streets.

== Geography ==
Viltsovo is located 24 km northeast of Suzdal (the district's administrative centre) by road. Kharitonovo is the nearest rural locality.
