= Sanino, Suzdalsky District, Vladimir Oblast =

Sanino Санино
- Selo
- Location within Vladimir Oblast Location within Russia
- Coordinates: 56°22′N 40°41′E
- Country: Russia
- Region: Vladimir Oblast
- District: Suzdalsky District
- Time zone: UTC+3:00

Sanino (Russian: Санино) is a rural locality (a selo) in Seletskoye Rural Settlement, Suzdalsky District, Vladimir Oblast, Russia. The population was 29 as of 2010. There are 2 streets.

== Geography ==
Sanino is located on the Uyechka River, 19 km southeast of Suzdal (the district's administrative centre) by road. Prudy is the nearest rural locality.
