= Yanovets =

Yanovets Яновец
- Selo
- Location within Vladimir Oblast Location within Russia
- Coordinates: 56°17′N 40°17′E
- Country: Russia
- Region: Vladimir Oblast
- District: Suzdalsky District
- Time zone: UTC+3:00

Yanovets (Russian: Яновец) is a rural locality (selo) in Seletskoye Rural Settlement, Suzdalsky District, Vladimir Oblast, Russia. Its population was 3 as of 2010. It has one street.

== Geography ==
Yanovets is on the Rpen River, 18 km southwest of Suzdal (the district's administrative centre) by road. Tarbayevo is the nearest rural locality.
