= Abakumlevo =

Abakumlevo Абакумлево
- Selo
- Location within Vladimir Oblast Location within Russia
- Coordinates: 56°24′N 40°33′E
- Country: Russia
- Region: Vladimir Oblast
- District: Suzdalsky District
- Time zone: UTC+3:00

Abakumlevo (Russian: Аба́кумлево) is a rural locality (a selo) in Seletskoye Rural Settlement of Suzdalsky District, Vladimir Oblast, Russia. The population was 13 as of 2010. There are 3 streets.

== Geography ==
Abakumlevo is located 10 km east of Suzdal (the district's administrative centre) by road. Novoselka Nerlskaya is the nearest rural locality.
