= Brutovo =

Brutovo Брутово
- Selo
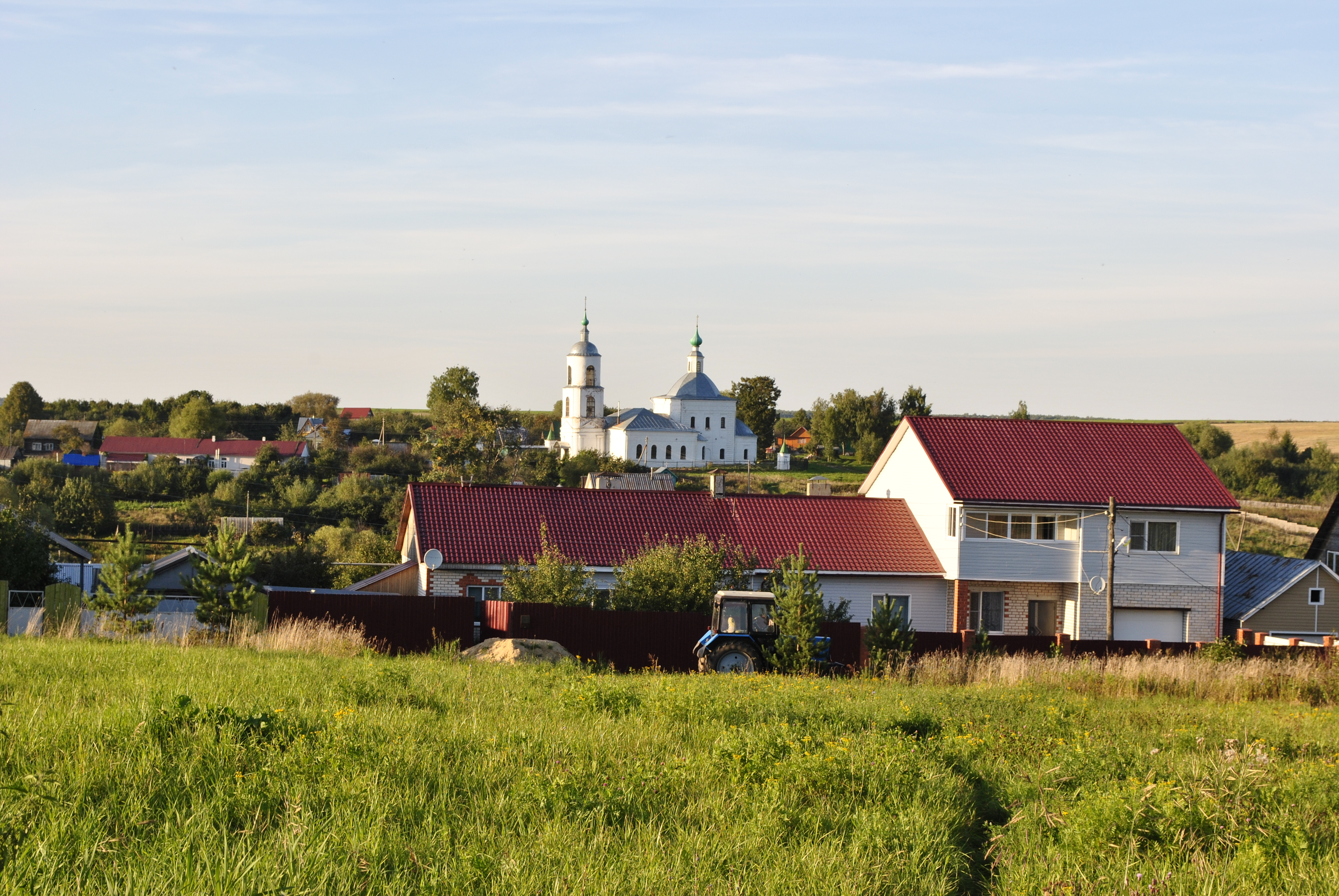
- Brutovo, Suzdalsky District, Vladimir Oblast, Russia

- Location within Vladimir Oblast Location within Russia
- Coordinates: 56°15′N 40°22′E
- Country: Russia
- Region: Vladimir Oblast
- District: Suzdalsky District
- Time zone: UTC+3:00

Brutovo (Russian: Брутово) is a rural locality (a selo) in Pavlovskoye Rural Settlement, Suzdalsky District, Vladimir Oblast, Russia. The population was 321 as of 2010. There are 13 streets.

== Geography ==
Brutovo is located 31 km southwest of Suzdal (the district's administrative centre) by road. Ovchukhi is the nearest rural locality.
