= Chernizh =

Chernizh Черниж
- Selo
- Location within Vladimir Oblast Location within Russia
- Coordinates: 56°22′N 40°25′E
- Country: Russia
- Region: Vladimir Oblast
- District: Suzdalsky District
- Time zone: UTC+3:00

Chernizh (Russian: Черниж) is a rural locality (a selo) in Seletskoye Rural Settlement, Suzdalsky District, Vladimir Oblast, Russia. The population was 145 as of 2010. There are 3 streets.

== Geography ==
Chernizh is located 7 km south of Suzdal (the district's administrative centre) by road. Gnezdilovo is the nearest rural locality.
