= Chirikovo =

Chirikovo Чириково
- Selo
- Location within Vladimir Oblast Location within Russia
- Coordinates: 56°15′N 40°37′E
- Country: Russia
- Region: Vladimir Oblast
- District: Suzdalsky District
- Time zone: UTC+3:00

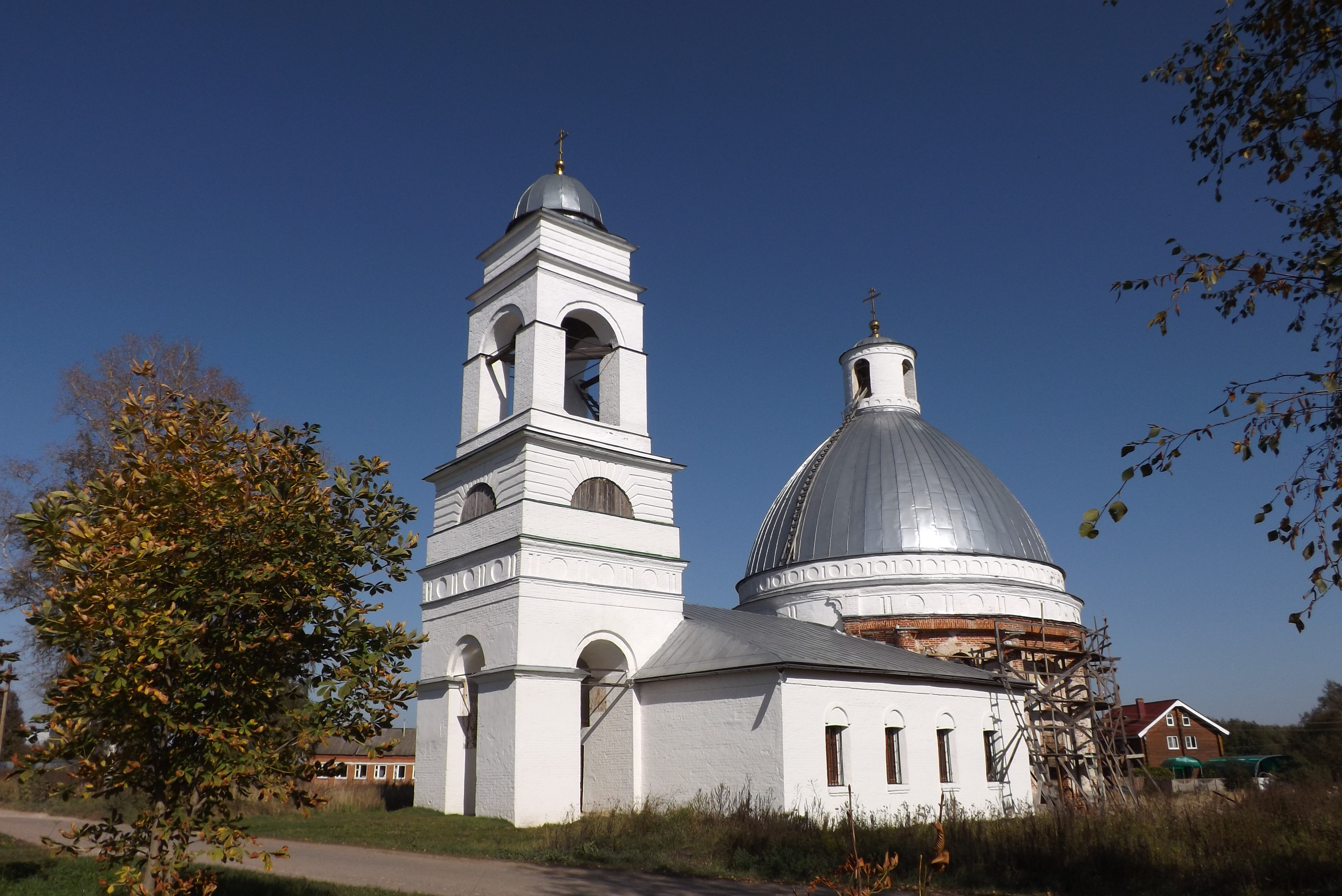
St. George's Church, Chirikovo

Chirikovo (Russian: Чириково) is a rural locality (a selo) in Bogolyubovskoye Rural Settlement, Suzdalsky District, Vladimir Oblast, Russia. The population was 34 as of 2010. There are 6 streets.

== Geography ==
Chirikovo is located 48 km southeast of Suzdal (the district's administrative centre) by road. Dorzhevo is the nearest rural locality.
