= Spasskoye-Gorodishche =

Spasskoye-Gorodishche Спасское-Городище
- Selo
- Location within Vladimir Oblast Location within Russia
- Coordinates: 56°21′N 40°31′E
- Country: Russia
- Region: Vladimir Oblast
- District: Suzdalsky District
- Time zone: UTC+3:00

Spasskoye-Gorodishche (Russian: Спа́сское-Городи́ще) is a rural locality (a selo) in Pavlovskoye Rural Settlement, Suzdalsky District, Vladimir Oblast, Russia. The population was 393 as of 2010. There are 6 streets.

== Geography ==
Spasskoye-Gorodishche is located on the right bank of the Nerl River, 12 km southeast of Suzdal (the district's administrative centre) by road. Barskoye-Gorodishche is the nearest rural locality.
