= Zapolitsy =

Zapolitsy Заполицы
- Selo

- Location within Vladimir Oblast Location within Russia
- Coordinates: 56°19′N 40°35′E
- Country: Russia
- Region: Vladimir Oblast
- District: Suzdalsky District
- Time zone: UTC+3:00

Zapolitsy (Russian: Заполицы) is a rural locality (a selo) in Pavlovskoye Rural Settlement, Suzdalsky District, Vladimir Oblast, Russia. The population was 21 as of 2010. There are 7 streets.

== Geography ==
Zapolitsy is located on the right bank of the Nerl River, 31 km southeast of Suzdal (the district's administrative centre) by road. Burakovo is the nearest rural locality.
