= Vasilkova (surname) =

Vasilkova is a female form of Russian (Василькова) and Belarus (Васількова) surname Vasilkov. Notable people with the surname include:

- Elvira Vasilkova (born 1962), Belarusian swimmer
- Maria Vasilkova (born 1978), Russian politician

== See also ==
- Vasilkovo
