= Snovitsy =

Snovitsy Сновицы
- Selo
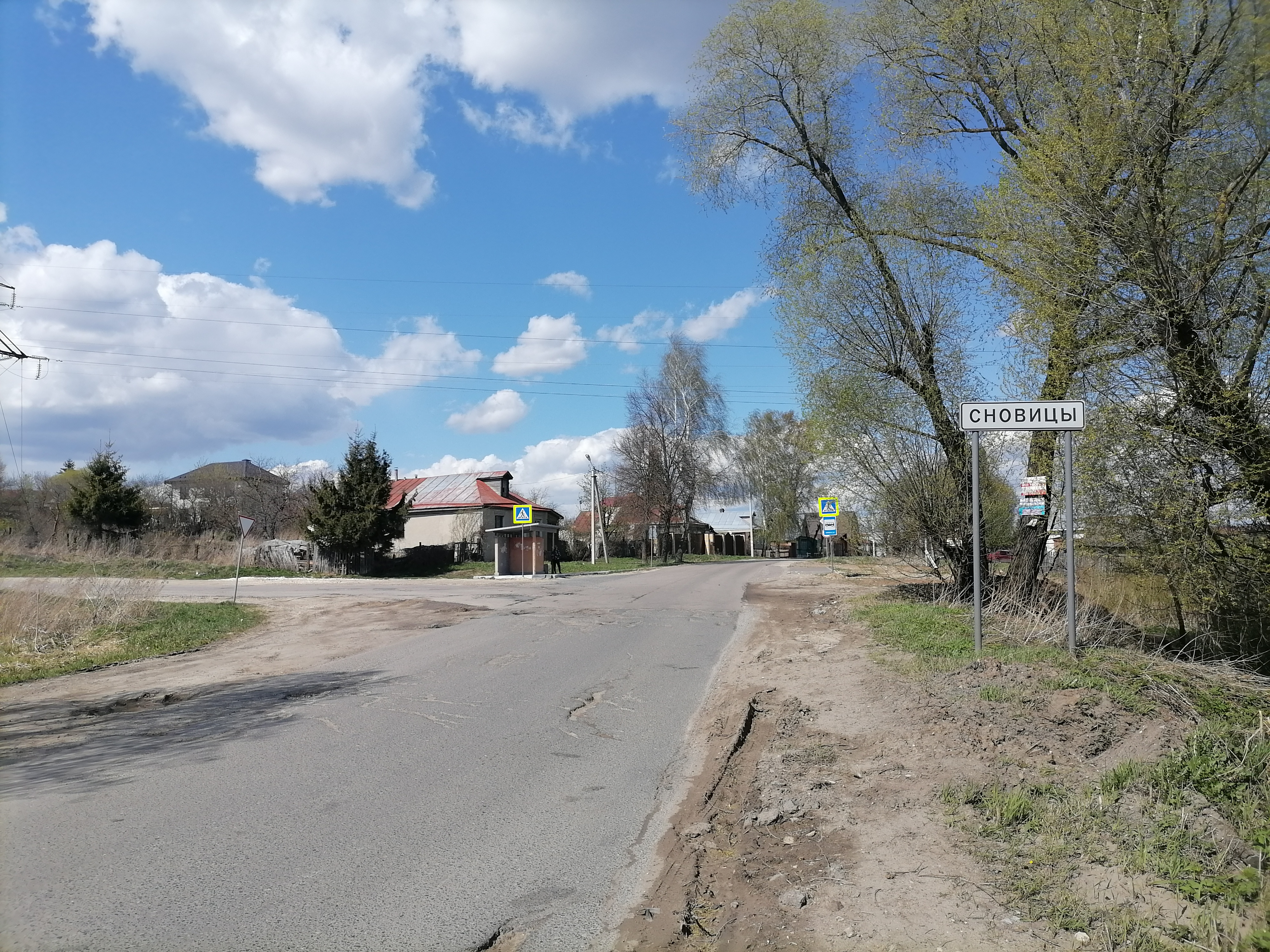

- Location within Vladimir Oblast Location within Russia
- Coordinates: 56°10′N 40°21′E
- Country: Russia
- Region: Vladimir Oblast
- District: Suzdalsky District
- Time zone: UTC+3:00

Snovitsy (Russian: Сновицы) is a rural locality (a selo) in Novoalexandrovskoye Rural Settlement, Suzdalsky District, Vladimir Oblast, Russia. Population: 3,210 (2021 census); 1,765 as of 2010. There are 45 streets.

== Geography ==
Snovitsy is located on the left bank of the Sodyshka River, 37 km south of Suzdal (the district's administrative centre) by road. Verizino is the nearest rural locality.
