= Velisovo =

Velisovo Велисово
- Village
- Location within Vladimir Oblast Location within Russia
- Coordinates: 56°16′N 40°38′E
- Country: Russia
- Region: Vladimir Oblast
- District: Suzdalsky District
- Time zone: UTC+3:00

Velisovo (Russian: Велисово) is a rural locality (a village) in Bogolyubovskoye Rural Settlement, Suzdalsky District, Vladimir Oblast, Russia. The population was 48 as of 2010. There are 6 streets.

== Geography ==
Velisovo is located 51 km southeast of Suzdal (the district's administrative centre) by road. Chirikovo is the nearest rural locality.
