= Zeleni =

Zeleni Зелени
- Village
- Location within Vladimir Oblast Location within Russia
- Coordinates: 56°12′N 40°18′E
- Country: Russia
- Region: Vladimir Oblast
- District: Suzdalsky District
- Time zone: UTC+3:00

Zeleni (Russian: Зелени) is a rural locality (a village) in Novoalexandrovskoye Rural Settlement, Suzdalsky District, Vladimir Oblast, Russia. The population was 119 as of 2010. There are 16 streets.

== Geography ==
Zeleni is located 43 km southwest of Suzdal (the district's administrative centre) by road. Maslenka is the nearest rural locality.
