= Troitsa-Bereg =

Troitsa-Bereg Троица-Берег
- Selo
- Location within Vladimir Oblast Location within Russia
- Coordinates: 56°26′N 40°29′E
- Country: Russia
- Region: Vladimir Oblast
- District: Suzdalsky District
- Time zone: UTC+3:00

Troitsa-Bereg (Russian: Троица-Берег) is a rural locality (a selo) in Seletskoye Rural Settlement, Suzdalsky District, Vladimir Oblast, Russia. The population was 123 as of 2010. There are 7 streets.

== Geography ==
Troitsa-Bereg is located on the Nerl River, 6 km northeast of Suzdal (the district's administrative centre) by road. Suzdal is the nearest rural locality.
