= Lyakhovitsy =

Lyakhovitsy Ляховицы
- Selo
- Location within Vladimir Oblast Location within Russia
- Coordinates: 56°24′N 40°37′E
- Country: Russia
- Region: Vladimir Oblast
- District: Suzdalsky District
- Time zone: UTC+3:00

Lyakhovitsy (Russian: Ляховицы) is a rural locality (a selo) in Seletskoye Rural Settlement, Suzdalsky District, Vladimir Oblast, Russia. The population was 96 as of 2010. There are 4 streets.

== Geography ==
Lyakhovitsy is located 11 km east of Suzdal (the district's administrative centre) by road. Bereznitsy is the nearest rural locality.
