= Bereznitsy, Suzdalsky District, Vladimir Oblast =

Bereznitsy Березницы
- Village
- Location within Vladimir Oblast Location within Russia
- Coordinates: 56°25′N 40°34′E
- Country: Russia
- Region: Vladimir Oblast
- District: Suzdalsky District
- Time zone: UTC+3:00

Bereznitsy (Russian: Березницы) is a rural locality (a village) in Seletskoye Rural Settlement, Suzdalsky District, Vladimir Oblast, Russia. The population was 18 as of 2010. There are 2 streets.

== Geography ==
Bereznitsy is located 8 km east of Suzdal (the district's administrative centre) by road. Lyakovitsy is the nearest rural locality.
