= Petrakovo, Suzdalsky District, Vladimir Oblast =

Petrakovo Петраково
- Selo
- Location within Vladimir Oblast Location within Russia
- Coordinates: 56°14′N 40°07′E
- Country: Russia
- Region: Vladimir Oblast
- District: Suzdalsky District
- Time zone: UTC+3:00

Petrakovo (Russian: Петраково) is a rural locality (a selo) in Novoalexandrovskoye Rural Settlement, Suzdalsky District, Vladimir Oblast, Russia. The population was 4 as of 2010. There are 2 streets.

== Geography ==
Petrakovo is located 35 km southwest of Suzdal (the district's administrative centre) by road. Koziki is the nearest rural locality.
