= Baskaki =

Baskaki Баскаки
- Selo
- Location within Vladimir Oblast Location within Russia
- Coordinates: 56°17′N 40°34′E
- Country: Russia
- Region: Vladimir Oblast
- District: Suzdalsky District
- Time zone: UTC+3:00

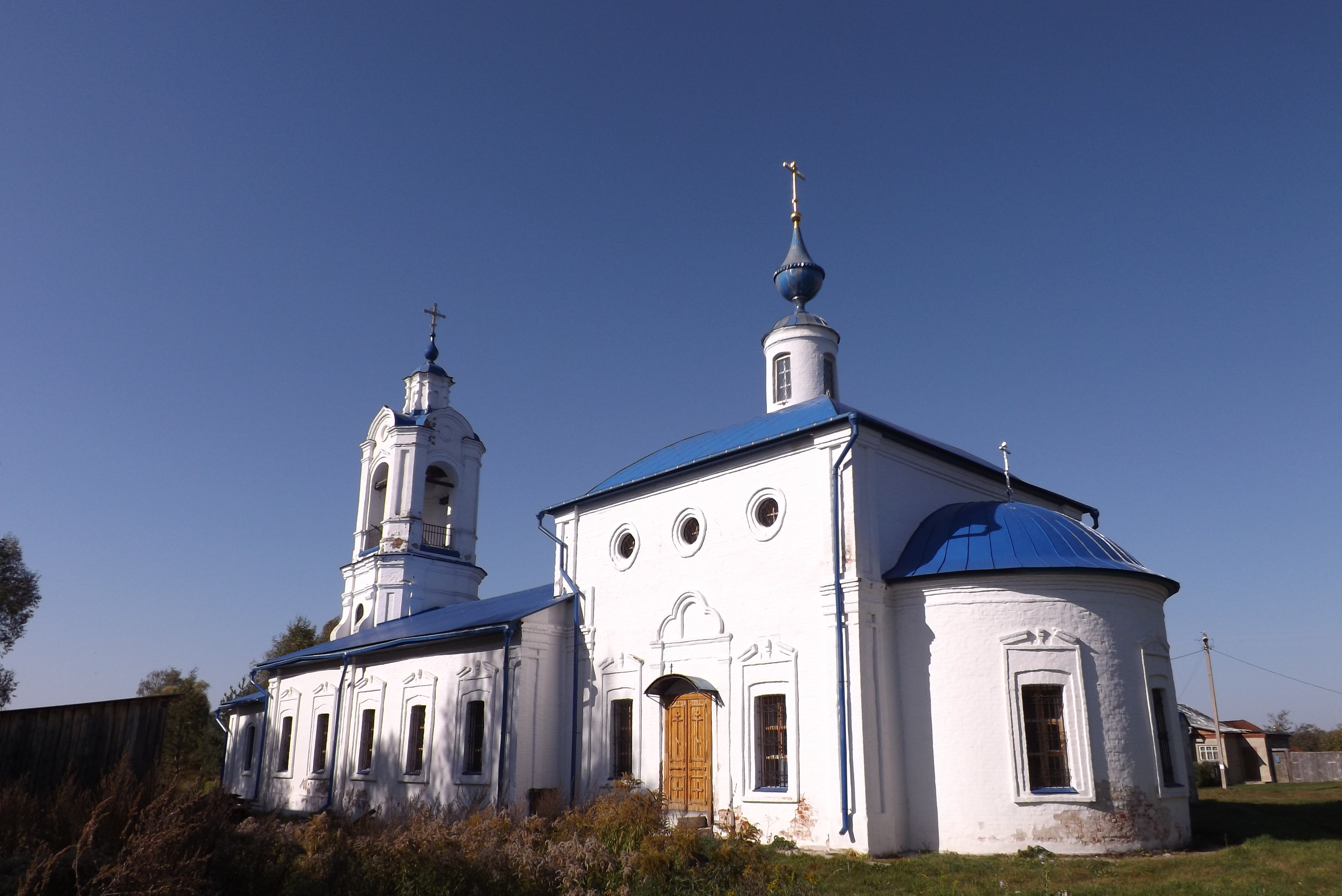
Church of the Nativity of the Virgin Mary with a bell tower: Baskaki, Suzdal District, Vladimir Region

Baskaki (Russian: Баскаки) is a rural locality (a selo) in Bogolyubovskoye Rural Settlement, Suzdalsky District, Vladimir Oblast, Russia. The population was 12 as of 2010. There are 15 streets.

== Geography ==
Baskaki is located 46 km southeast of Suzdal (the district's administrative centre) by road. Ramenye is the nearest rural locality.
