= Turovo, Suzdalsky District, Vladimir Oblast =

Turovo Турово
- Selo
- Location within Vladimir Oblast Location within Russia
- Coordinates: 56°29′N 40°27′E
- Country: Russia
- Region: Vladimir Oblast
- District: Suzdalsky District
- Time zone: UTC+3:00

Turovo (Russian: Турово) is a rural locality (a selo) in Seletskoye Rural Settlement, Suzdalsky District, Vladimir Oblast, Russia. The population was 5 as of 2010.

== Geography ==
Turovo is located 12 km north of Suzdal (the district's administrative centre) by road. Malo-Boriskovo is the nearest rural locality.
