= Malininsky =

Malininsky Малининский
- Settlement
- Location within Vladimir Oblast Location within Russia
- Coordinates: 56°18′N 40°13′E
- Country: Russia
- Region: Vladimir Oblast
- District: Suzdalsky District
- Time zone: UTC+3:00

Malininsky (Russian: Малининский) is a rural locality (a settlement) in Novoalexandrovskoye Rural Settlement, Suzdalsky District, Vladimir Oblast, Russia. The population was 89 as of 2010. There are 2 streets.

== Geography ==
Malininsky is located 22 km southwest of Suzdal (the district's administrative centre) by road. Stary Dvor is the nearest rural locality.
