= Bagrinovo =

Bagrinovo Багриново
- Village
- Location within Vladimir Oblast Location within Russia
- Coordinates: 56°09′N 40°17′E
- Country: Russia
- Region: Vladimir Oblast
- District: Suzdalsky District
- Time zone: UTC+3:00

Bagrinovo (Russian: Багриново) is a rural locality (a village) in Novoalexandrovskoye Rural Settlement, Suzdalsky District, Vladimir Oblast, Russia. The population was 24 as of 2010. There are 2 streets.

== Geography ==
Bagrinovo is located 42 km southwest of Suzdal (the district's administrative centre) by road. Zagorye is the nearest rural locality.
