= Semyonovskoye-Krasnoye =

Semyonovskoye-Krasnoye Семёновское-Красное
- Selo
- Location within Vladimir Oblast Location within Russia
- Coordinates: 56°20′N 40°26′E
- Country: Russia
- Region: Vladimir Oblast
- District: Suzdalsky District
- Time zone: UTC+3:00

Semyonovskoye-Krasnoye (Russian: Семёновское-Красное) is a rural locality (a selo) in Pavlovskoye Rural Settlement, Suzdalsky District, Vladimir Oblast, Russia. The population was 299 as of 2010. There are 3 streets.

== Geography ==
Semyonovskoye-Krasnoye is located 11 km south of Suzdal (the district's administrative centre) by road. Tereneyevo is the nearest rural locality.
