= Borisovskaya, Verkhovazhsky District, Vologda Oblast =

Borisovskaya Борисовская
- Village
- Location within Vologda Oblast Location within Russia
- Coordinates: 60°42′N 42°18′E
- Country: Russia
- Region: Vologda Oblast
- District: Verkhovazhsky District

Population
  - Total: 1
- Time zone: UTC+3:00

Borisovskaya (Russian: Борисовская) is a rural locality (a village) in Nizhne-Vazhskoye Rural Settlement, Verkhovazhsky District, Vologda Oblast, Russia. The population was 1 as of 2002.

== Geography ==
Borisovskaya is located 16 km south of Verkhovazhye (the district's administrative centre) by road. Lymzino is the nearest rural locality.
