= Grigorevo (Vladimir Oblast) =

Grigorevo Григорево
- Village
- Location within Vladimir Oblast Location within Russia
- Coordinates: 56°25′N 40°15′E
- Country: Russia
- Region: Vladimir Oblast
- District: Suzdalsky District
- Time zone: UTC+3:00

Grigorevo (Russian: Григорево) is a rural locality (a village) in Seletskoye Rural Settlement, Suzdalsky District, Vladimir Oblast, Russia. The population was 1 as of 2010. There are 2 streets.

== Geography ==
Grigorevo is located on the Tumka River, 18 km west of Suzdal (the district's administrative centre) by road. Konstantinovo is the nearest rural locality.
