= Vasilkovo =

Vasilkovo Васильково
- Selo
- Location within Vladimir Oblast Location within Russia
- Coordinates: 56°17′N 40°33′E
- Country: Russia
- Region: Vladimir Oblast
- District: Suzdalsky District
- Time zone: UTC+3:00

Vasilkovo (Russian: Васильково) is a rural locality (a selo) in Pavlovskoye Rural Settlement, Suzdalsky District, Vladimir Oblast, Russia. The population was 24 as of 2010. There are 7 streets.

== Geography ==
Vasilkovo is located on the right bank of the Nerl River, 26 km southeast of Suzdal (the district's administrative centre) by road. Vasilkovo-2 is the nearest rural locality.
