= Borisovskoye, Vladimir Oblast =

Borisovskoye Борисовское
- Selo
- Location within Vladimir Oblast Location within Russia
- Coordinates: 56°16′N 40°28′E
- Country: Russia
- Region: Vladimir Oblast
- District: Suzdalsky District
- Time zone: UTC+3:00

Borisovskoye (Russian: Борисовское) is a rural locality (a selo) in Pavlovskoye Rural Settlement, Suzdalsky District, Vladimir Oblast, Russia. The population was 646 as of 2010. There are 23 streets.

== Geography ==
Borisovskoye is located on the Pokolyayka River, 19 km south of Suzdal (the district's administrative centre) by road. Poretskoye is the nearest rural locality.
