= Brodnitsy =

Brodnitsy Бродницы
- Village
- Location within Vladimir Oblast Location within Russia
- Coordinates: 56°13′N 40°24′E
- Country: Russia
- Region: Vladimir Oblast
- District: Suzdalsky District
- Time zone: UTC+3:00

Brodnitsy (Russian: Бродницы) is a rural locality (a village) in Pavlovskoye Rural Settlement, Suzdalsky District, Vladimir Oblast, Russia. The population was 108 as of 2010. There are 7 streets.

== Geography ==
Brodnitsy is located 25 km south of Suzdal (the district's administrative centre) by road. Sadovy is the nearest rural locality.
