= Borisovskaya, Syamzhensky District, Vologda Oblast =

Borisovskaya Борисовская
- Village
- Location within Vologda Oblast Location within Russia
- Coordinates: 60°02′N 41°25′E
- Country: Russia
- Region: Vologda Oblast
- District: Syamzhensky District
- Time zone: UTC+3:00

Borisovskaya (Russian: Борисовская) is a rural locality (a village) in Korobitsynskoye Rural Settlement, Syamzhensky District, Vologda Oblast, Russia. The population was 32 as of 2002.

== Geography ==
Borisovskaya is located 37 km northeast of Syamzha (the district's administrative centre) by road. Yeskino is the nearest rural locality.
