= Borisovskaya, Tarnogsky District, Vologda Oblast =

Borisovskaya Борисовская
- Village
- Location within Vologda Oblast Location within Russia
- Coordinates: 60°41′N 43°46′E
- Country: Russia
- Region: Vologda Oblast
- District: Tarnogsky District
- Time zone: UTC+3:00

Borisovskaya (Russian: Борисовская) is a rural locality (a village) in Tarnogskoye Rural Settlement, Tarnogsky District, Vologda Oblast, Russia. The population was 9 as of 2002.

== Geography ==
Borisovskaya is located 32 km northeast of Tarnogsky Gorodok (the district's administrative centre) by road. Mitroshinskaya is the nearest rural locality.
