= Borisovsky, Volgograd Oblast =

Borisovsky Борисовский
- Khutor
- Location within Volgograd Oblast Location within Russia
- Coordinates: 50°27′N 42°29′E
- Country: Russia
- Region: Volgograd Oblast
- District: Novoanninsky District
- Time zone: UTC+4:00

Borisovsky (Russian: Борисовский) is a rural locality (a khutor) in Staroanninskoye Rural Settlement, Novoanninsky District, Volgograd Oblast, Russia. The population was 137 as of 2010.

== Geography ==
Borisovsky is located near Malyye and Bolshiye Yaryzhki Lakes, 20 km southwest of Novoanninsky (the district's administrative centre) by road. Pereshchepnovsky is the nearest rural locality.
