= Borisovskaya, Fedkovsky Selsoviet, Verkhnetoyemsky District, Arkhangelsk Oblast =

Borisovskaya Борисовская
- Village
- Location within Arkhangelsk Oblast Location within Russia
- Coordinates: 62°03′N 45°05′E
- Country: Russia
- Region: Arkhangelsk Oblast
- District: Verkhnetoyemsky District
- Time zone: UTC+3:00

Borisovskaya (Russian: Борисовская) is a rural locality (a village) in Verkhnetoyemsky District, Arkhangelsk Oblast, Russia. The population was 58 as of 2010.

== Geography ==
It is located on the Severnaya Dvina River, 20 km from Verknyaya Toyma.
