= Suzdalsky District =

Suzdalsky District Суздальский район (Russian)
- District
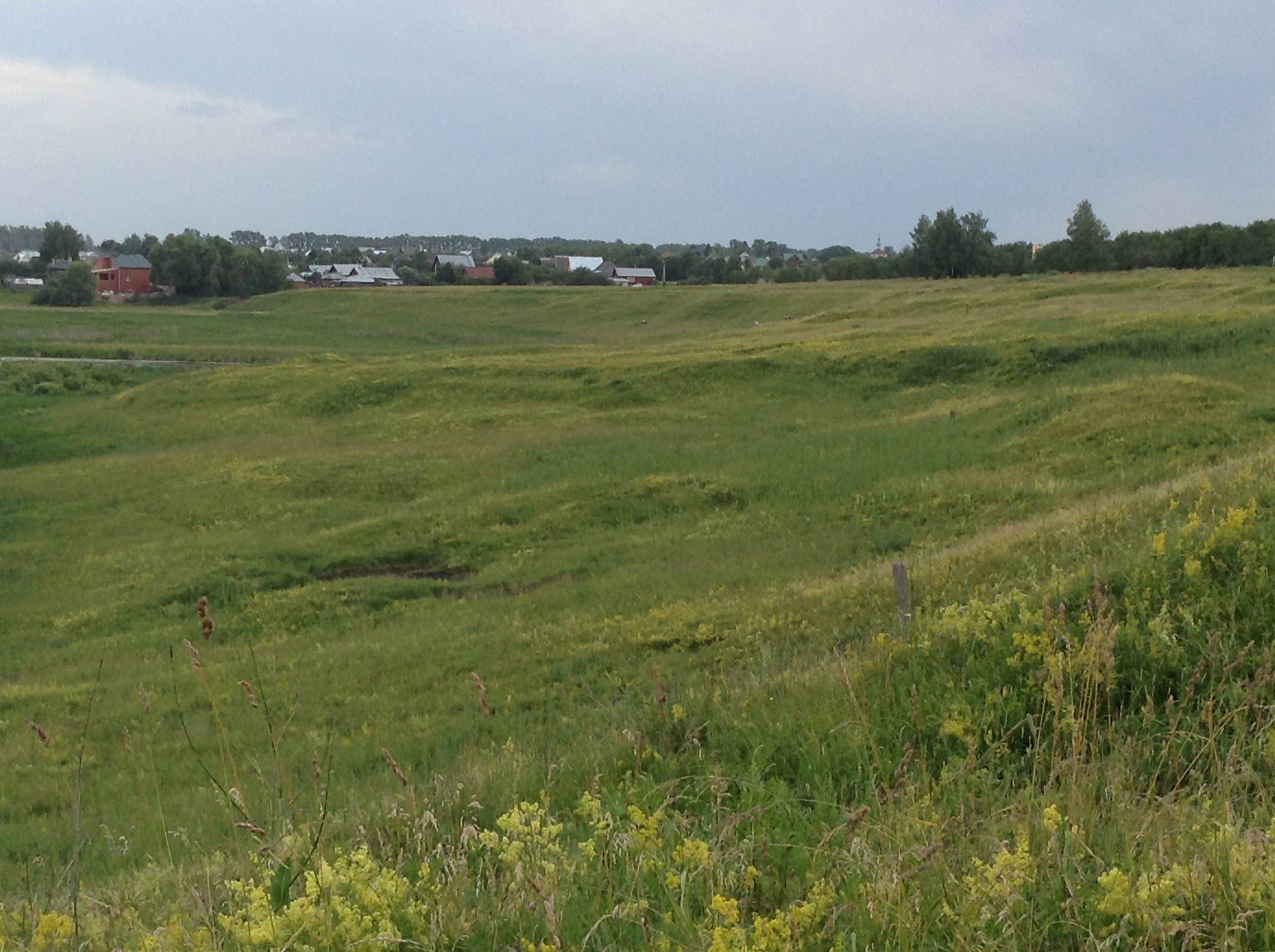
- Ilyinsky meadow, Suzdalsky District

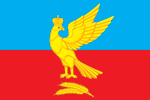
- Flag Coat of arms
- Location of Suzdalsky District in Vladimir Oblast
- Coordinates: 56°25′N 40°27′E
- Country: Russia
- Federal subject: Vladimir Oblast
- Established: 10 April 1929
- Administrative center: Suzdal

Area
  - Total: 1,479 km^{2} (571 sq mi)

Population (2010 Census)
  - Total: 44,114
  - Density: 29.83/km^{2} (77.25/sq mi)
  - Urban: 23.9%
  - Rural: 76.1%

Administrative structure
  - Inhabited localities: 1 cities/towns, 138 rural localities

Municipal structure
  - Municipally incorporated as: Suzdalsky Municipal District
  - Municipal divisions: 1 urban settlements, 4 rural settlements
- Time zone: UTC+3 (MSK)
- OKTMO ID: 17654000
- Website: http://www.suzdalregion.ru/

Suzdalsky District (Russian: Су́здальский райо́н) is an administrative and municipal district (raion), one of the sixteen in Vladimir Oblast, Russia. It is located in the north of the oblast. The area of the district is 1,479 square kilometers (571 sq mi). Its administrative center is the town of Suzdal. Population: 46,084 (2021 census); 44,114 (2010 census); 39,736 (2002 Census); 39,670 (1989 Soviet census). The population of Suzdal accounts for 20.2% of the district's total population.
