= Derevenka =

Derevenka may refer to several settlements in Russia:

- Derevenka, Sokolsky District, Vologda Oblast
- Derevenka, Kharovsky District, Vologda Oblast
- Derevenka, Parfyonovskoye Rural Settlement, Velikoustyugsky District, Vologda Oblast
- Derevenka, Teplogorskoye Rural Settlement, Velikoustyugsky District, Vologda Oblast
- Derevenka, Vozhegodsky District, Vologda Oblast
- Derevenka, Vologodsky District, Vologda Oblast

In combination:

- Derevenka Kuznechikha
- Derevenka Shapshinskaya
