= Davydovskaya =

Davydovskaya may refer to the following localities in Russia:

- Davydovskaya, Syamzhensky District, Vologda Oblast
- Davydovskaya, Tarnogsky District, Vologda Oblast
- Davydovskaya, Ust-Kubinsky District, Vologda Oblast
