= Prozhektor, Syamzhensky District, Vologda Oblast =

Prozhektor Прожектор
- Village
- Location within Vologda Oblast Location within Russia
- Coordinates: 60°03′N 40°46′E
- Country: Russia
- Region: Vologda Oblast
- District: Syamzhensky District
- Time zone: UTC+3:00

Prozhektor (Russian: Прожектор) is a rural locality (a village) in Ustretskoye Rural Settlement, Syamzhensky District, Vologda Oblast, Russia. The population was 12 as of 2002.

== Geography ==
Prozhektor is located 23 km northwest of Syamzha (the district's administrative centre) by road. Gorka is the nearest rural locality.
