= Nikulinskaya, Syamzhensky District, Vologda Oblast =

Nikulinskaya Никулинская
- Village
- Location within Vologda Oblast Location within Russia
- Coordinates: 60°15′N 41°38′E
- Country: Russia
- Region: Vologda Oblast
- District: Syamzhensky District
- Time zone: UTC+3:00

Nikulinskaya (Russian: Никулинская) is a rural locality (a village) in Dvinitskoye Rural Settlement, Syamzhensky District, Vologda Oblast, Russia. The population was 78 as of 2002.

== Geography ==
Nikulinskaya is located 52 km northeast of Syamzha (the district's administrative centre) by road. Vakhrushevskaya is the nearest rural locality.
