= Zhityovo =

Zhityovo Житьёво
- Village
- Location within Vologda Oblast Location within Russia
- Coordinates: 59°54′N 41°06′E
- Country: Russia
- Region: Vologda Oblast
- District: Syamzhensky District
- Time zone: UTC+3:00

Zhityovo (Russian: Житьёво) is a rural locality (a village) and the administrative center of Zhityovskoye Rural Settlement, Syamzhensky District, Vologda Oblast, Russia. The population was 316 as of 2002. There are 8 streets.

== Geography ==
Zhityovo is located 21 km south of Syamzha (the district's administrative centre) by road. Davydkovo is the nearest rural locality.
