= Maryinskaya, Syamzhensky District, Vologda Oblast =

Maryinskaya Марьинская
- Village
- Location within Vologda Oblast Location within Russia
- Coordinates: 59°52′N 41°25′E
- Country: Russia
- Region: Vologda Oblast
- District: Syamzhensky District
- Time zone: UTC+3:00

Maryinskaya (Russian: Марьинская) is a rural locality (a village) in Korobitsynskoye Rural Settlement, Syamzhensky District, Vologda Oblast, Russia. The population was 5 as of 2002.

== Geography ==
Maryinskaya is located 61 km southeast of Syamzha (the district's administrative centre) by road. Piligino is the nearest rural locality.
