= Chaglotovo =

Chaglotovo Чаглотово
- Village
- Location within Vologda Oblast Location within Russia
- Coordinates: 60°08′N 41°03′E
- Country: Russia
- Region: Vologda Oblast
- District: Syamzhensky District
- Time zone: UTC+3:00

Chaglotovo (Russian: Чаглотово) is a rural locality (a village) in Noginskoye Rural Settlement, Syamzhensky District, Vologda Oblast, Russia. The population was 14 as of 2002.

== Geography ==
Chaglotovo is located 20 km north of Syamzha (the district's administrative centre) by road. Ivanovskaya is the nearest rural locality.
