= Kharitonovskaya, Syamzhensky District, Vologda Oblast =

Kharitonovskaya Харитоновская
- Village
- Location within Vologda Oblast Location within Russia
- Coordinates: 60°15′N 41°05′E
- Country: Russia
- Region: Vologda Oblast
- District: Syamzhensky District
- Time zone: UTC+3:00

Kharitonovskaya (Russian: Харитоновская) is a rural locality (a village) in Ramenskoye Rural Settlement, Syamzhensky District, Vologda Oblast, Russia. The population was 23 as of 2002.

== Geography ==
Kharitonovskaya is located 41 km north of Syamzha (the district's administrative centre) by road. Ramenye is the nearest rural locality.
