= Veliky Dvor, Syamzhensky District, Vologda Oblast =

Veliky Dvor Великий Двор
- Village
- Location within Vologda Oblast Location within Russia
- Coordinates: 60°12′N 41°19′E
- Country: Russia
- Region: Vologda Oblast
- District: Syamzhensky District
- Time zone: UTC+3:00

Veliky Dvor (Russian: Великий Двор) is a rural locality (a village) in Ramenskoye Rural Settlement, Syamzhensky District, Vologda Oblast, Russia. The population was 14 as of 2002.

== Geography ==
Veliky Dvor is located 28 km northeast of Syamzha (the district's administrative centre) by road. Vasilyevskaya is the nearest rural locality.
