= Puronga =

Puronga Пуронга
- Village
- Location within Vologda Oblast Location within Russia
- Coordinates: 60°08′N 40°54′E
- Country: Russia
- Region: Vologda Oblast
- District: Syamzhensky District
- Time zone: UTC+3:00

Puronga (Russian: Пуронга) is a rural locality (a village) in Ustretskoye Rural Settlement, Syamzhensky District, Vologda Oblast, Russia. The population was 17 as of 2002.

== Geography ==
Puronga is located 29 km northwest of Syamzha (the district's administrative centre) by road. Klokovo is the nearest rural locality.
