= Arganovo =

Arganovo Арганово
- Village
- Location within Vologda Oblast Location within Russia
- Coordinates: 60°01′N 41°32′E
- Country: Russia
- Region: Vologda Oblast
- District: Syamzhensky District
- Time zone: UTC+3:00

Arganovo (Russian: Арганово) is a rural locality (a village) in Korobitsynskoye Rural Settlement, Syamzhensky District, Vologda Oblast, Russia. The population was 29 as of 2002.

== Geography ==
Arganovo is located 35 km east of Syamzha (the district's administrative centre) by road. Chirkovskaya is the nearest rural locality.
