= Kuzminskaya, Syamzhensky District, Vologda Oblast =

Kuzminskaya Кузьминская
- Village
- Location within Vologda Oblast Location within Russia
- Coordinates: 60°02′N 40°47′E
- Country: Russia
- Region: Vologda Oblast
- District: Syamzhensky District
- Time zone: UTC+3:00

Kuzminskaya (Russian: Кузьминская) is a rural locality (a village) in Ustretskoye Rural Settlement, Syamzhensky District, Vologda Oblast, Russia. The population was 11 as of 2002.

== Geography ==
Kuzminskaya is located 20 km northwest of Syamzha (the district's administrative centre) by road. Ust-Reka is the nearest rural locality.
