= Koltyrikha =

Koltyrikha Колтыриха
- Village
- Location within Vologda Oblast Location within Russia
- Coordinates: 60°07′N 41°40′E
- Country: Russia
- Region: Vologda Oblast
- District: Syamzhensky District
- Time zone: UTC+3:00

Koltyrikha (Russian: Колтыриха) is a rural locality (a village) in Rezhskoye Rural Settlement, Syamzhensky District, Vologda Oblast, Russia. The population was 44 as of 2002.

== Geography ==
Koltyrikha is located 47 km northeast of Syamzha (the district's administrative centre) by road. Lukinskaya is the nearest rural locality.
