= Trubakovo =

Trubakovo Трубаково
- Village
- Location within Vologda Oblast Location within Russia
- Coordinates: 59°58′N 41°06′E
- Country: Russia
- Region: Vologda Oblast
- District: Syamzhensky District
- Time zone: UTC+3:00

Trubakovo (Russian: Трубаково) is a rural locality (a village) in Noginskoye Rural Settlement, Syamzhensky District, Vologda Oblast, Russia. The population was 4 as of 2002.

== Geography ==
Trubakovo is located 7 km south of Syamzha (the district's administrative centre) by road. Ushakovskaya is the nearest rural locality.
