= Rechkovskaya =

Rechkovskaya Речковская
- Village
- Location within Vologda Oblast Location within Russia
- Coordinates: 60°05′N 40°48′E
- Country: Russia
- Region: Vologda Oblast
- District: Syamzhensky District
- Time zone: UTC+3:00

Rechkovskaya (Russian: Речковская) is a rural locality (a village) in Ustretskoye Rural Settlement, Syamzhensky District, Vologda Oblast, Russia. The population was 10 as of 2002.

== Geography ==
Rechkovskaya is located 28 km northwest of Syamzha (the district's administrative centre) by road. Kocherzhikha is the nearest rural locality.
