= Ignashevskaya =

Ignashevskaya Игнашевская
- Village
- Location within Vologda Oblast Location within Russia
- Coordinates: 60°18′N 41°32′E
- Country: Russia
- Region: Vologda Oblast
- District: Syamzhensky District
- Time zone: UTC+3:00

Ignashevskaya (Russian: Игнашевская) is a rural locality (a village) in Dvinitskoye Rural Settlement, Syamzhensky District, Vologda Oblast, Russia. The population was 10 as of 2002.

== Geography ==
Ignashevskaya is located 45 km northeast of Syamzha (the district's administrative centre) by road. Rogovitsynskaya is the nearest rural locality.
