= Rubtsovo, Syamzhensky District, Vologda Oblast =

Rubtsovo Рубцово
- Village
- Location within Vologda Oblast Location within Russia
- Coordinates: 60°02′N 41°34′E
- Country: Russia
- Region: Vologda Oblast
- District: Syamzhensky District
- Time zone: UTC+3:00

Rubtsovo (Russian: Рубцово) is a rural locality (a village) in Korobitsynskoye Rural Settlement, Syamzhensky District, Vologda Oblast, Russia. The population was 9 as of 2002.

== Geography ==
Rubtsovo is located 40 km east of Syamzha (the district's administrative centre) by road. Martyanikha is the nearest rural locality.
