= Gerasimikha =

Gerasimikha Герасимиха
- Village
- Location within Vologda Oblast Location within Russia
- Coordinates: 60°02′N 40°45′E
- Country: Russia
- Region: Vologda Oblast
- District: Syamzhensky District
- Time zone: UTC+3:00

Gerasimikha (Russian: Герасимиха) is a rural locality (a village) in Ustretskoye Rural Settlement, Syamzhensky District, Vologda Oblast, Russia. The population was 10 as of 2002.

== Geography ==
Gerasimikha is located 22 km northwest of Syamzha (the district's administrative centre) by road. Ust-Reka is the nearest rural locality.
