= Kopylovo, Syamzhensky District, Vologda Oblast =

Kopylovo Копылово
- Village
- Location within Vologda Oblast Location within Russia
- Coordinates: 60°08′N 41°37′E
- Country: Russia
- Region: Vologda Oblast
- District: Syamzhensky District
- Time zone: UTC+3:00

Kopylovo (Russian: Копылово) is a rural locality (a village) and the administrative center of Rezhskoye Rural Settlement, Syamzhensky District, Vologda Oblast, Russia. The population was 115 as of 2002. There are 2 streets.

== Geography ==
Kopylovo is located 42 km northeast of Syamzha (the district's administrative centre) by road. Korobitsyno is the nearest rural locality.
