= Klimushino, Syamzhensky District, Vologda Oblast =

Klimushino Климушино
- Village
- Location within Vologda Oblast Location within Russia
- Coordinates: 59°54′N 41°33′E
- Country: Russia
- Region: Vologda Oblast
- District: Syamzhensky District
- Time zone: UTC+3:00

Klimushino (Russian: Климушино) is a rural locality (a village) in Korobitsynskoye Rural Settlement, Syamzhensky District, Vologda Oblast, Russia. The population was 39 as of 2002.

== Geography ==
Klimushino is located 52 km southeast of Syamzha (the district's administrative centre) by road. Goluzino is the nearest rural locality.
