= Zakostimye =

Zakostimye Закостимье
- Village
- Location within Vologda Oblast Location within Russia
- Coordinates: 60°05′N 40°50′E
- Country: Russia
- Region: Vologda Oblast
- District: Syamzhensky District
- Time zone: UTC+3:00

Zakostimye (Russian: Закостимье) is a rural locality (a village) in Ustretskoye Rural Settlement, Syamzhensky District, Vologda Oblast, Russia. The population was 7 as of 2002.

== Geography ==
Zakostimye is located 31 km northwest of Syamzha (the district's administrative centre) by road. Poluyanikha is the nearest rural locality.
