= Volkhovsky =

Volkhovsky (masculine), Volkhovskaya (feminine), or Volkhovskoye (neuter) may refer to:

- Volkhovsky District, a district of Leningrad Oblast, Russia
- Volkhovskoye Urban Settlement, a municipal formation corresponding to Volkhovskoye Settlement Municipal Formation, an administrative division of Volkhovsky District of Leningrad Oblast, Russia
- Volkhovskaya, a rural locality (a village) in Syamzhensky District of Vologda Oblast, Russia
