= Vysokovo, Syamzhensky District, Vologda Oblast =

Vysokovo Высоково
- Village
- Location within Vologda Oblast Location within Russia
- Coordinates: 59°59′N 41°36′E
- Country: Russia
- Region: Vologda Oblast
- District: Syamzhensky District
- Time zone: UTC+3:00

Vysokovo (Russian: Высоково) is a rural locality (a village) in Korobitsynskoye Rural Settlement, Syamzhensky District, Vologda Oblast, Russia. The population was 20 as of 2002.

== Geography ==
Vysokovo is located 40 km east of Syamzha (the district's administrative centre) by road. Pestino is the nearest rural locality.
