= Uzmitsa =

Uzmitsa Узмица
- Village
- Location within Vologda Oblast Location within Russia
- Coordinates: 60°00′N 41°36′E
- Country: Russia
- Region: Vologda Oblast
- District: Syamzhensky District
- Time zone: UTC+3:00

Uzmitsa (Russian: Узмица) is a rural locality (a village) in Korobitsynskoye Rural Settlement, Syamzhensky District, Vologda Oblast, Russia. The population was 19 as of 2002.

== Geography ==
Uzmitsa is located 39 km east of Syamzha (the district's administrative centre) by road. Podgornaya is the nearest rural locality.
