= Putkovo =

Putkovo Путково
- Village
- Location within Vologda Oblast Location within Russia
- Coordinates: 60°15′N 41°40′E
- Country: Russia
- Region: Vologda Oblast
- District: Syamzhensky District
- Time zone: UTC+3:00

Putkovo (Russian: Путково) is a rural locality (a village) in Dvinitskoye Rural Settlement, Syamzhensky District, Vologda Oblast, Russia. The population was 4 as of 2002.

== Geography ==
Putkovo is located 55 km northeast of Syamzha (the district's administrative centre) by road. Kolbinskaya is the nearest rural locality.
