= Ramenye, Syamzhensky District, Vologda Oblast =

Ramenye Раменье
- Village
- Location within Vologda Oblast Location within Russia
- Coordinates: 60°14′N 41°05′E
- Country: Russia
- Region: Vologda Oblast
- District: Syamzhensky District
- Time zone: UTC+3:00

Ramenye (Russian: Раменье) is a rural locality (a village) and the administrative center of Ramenskoye Rural Settlement, Syamzhensky District, Vologda Oblast, Russia. The population was 308 as of 2002. There are 8 streets.

== Geography ==
Ramenye is located 40 km north of Syamzha (the district's administrative centre) by road. Kharitonovskaya is the nearest locality. рамень- shoulder in Slavic languages. River Valga in Sanskrit blooming
