= Trusikha =

Trusikha Трусиха
- Village
- Location within Vologda Oblast Location within Russia
- Coordinates: 60°01′N 40°59′E
- Country: Russia
- Region: Vologda Oblast
- District: Syamzhensky District
- Time zone: UTC+3:00

Trusikha (Russian: Трусиха) is a rural locality (a village) in Noginskoye Rural Settlement, Syamzhensky District, Vologda Oblast, Russia. The population was 5 as of 2002.

== Geography ==
Trusikha is located 6 km northwest of Syamzha (the district's administrative centre) by road. Olekhovskaya is the nearest rural locality.
