= Lukinskaya, Syamzhensky District, Vologda Oblast =

Lukinskaya Лукинская
- Village
- Location within Vologda Oblast Location within Russia
- Coordinates: 60°07′N 41°39′E
- Country: Russia
- Region: Vologda Oblast
- District: Syamzhensky District
- Time zone: UTC+3:00

Lukinskaya (Russian: Лукинская) is a rural locality (a village) in Rezhskoye Rural Settlement, Syamzhensky District, Vologda Oblast, Russia. The population was 48 as of 2002. There are 2 streets.

== Geography ==
Lukinskaya is located 46 km northeast of Syamzha (the district's administrative centre) by road. Koltyrikha is the nearest rural locality.
