= Shishakovo =

Shishakovo Шишаково
- Village
- Location within Vologda Oblast Location within Russia
- Coordinates: 60°01′N 41°29′E
- Country: Russia
- Region: Vologda Oblast
- District: Syamzhensky District
- Time zone: UTC+3:00

Shishakovo (Russian: Шишаково) is a rural locality (a village) in Korobitsynskoye Rural Settlement, Syamzhensky District, Vologda Oblast, Russia. The population was 48 as of 2002. Shishakovo is located 33 km east of Syamzha (the district's administrative centre) by road. Korostelevo is the nearest rural locality.
