= Novaya Sluda =

Novaya Sluda Новая Слуда
- Village
- Location within Vologda Oblast Location within Russia
- Coordinates: 60°16′N 41°35′E
- Country: Russia
- Region: Vologda Oblast
- District: Syamzhensky District
- Time zone: UTC+3:00

Novaya Sluda (Russian: Новая Слуда) is a rural locality (a village) in Dvinitskoye Rural Settlement, Syamzhensky District, Vologda Oblast, Russia. The population was 20 as of 2002.

== Geography ==
Novaya Sluda is located 50 km northeast of Syamzha (the district's administrative centre) by road. Srednyaya Sluda is the nearest rural locality.
