= Ponomarikha =

Ponomarikha Пономариха
- Village
- Location within Vologda Oblast Location within Russia
- Coordinates: 60°01′N 40°44′E
- Country: Russia
- Region: Vologda Oblast
- District: Syamzhensky District
- Time zone: UTC+3:00

Ponomarikha (Russian: Пономариха) is a rural locality (a village) in Ustretskoye Rural Settlement, Syamzhensky District, Vologda Oblast, Russia. The population was 27 as of 2002.

== Geography ==
Ponomarikha is located 23 km west of Syamzha (the district's administrative centre) by road. Ust-Reka is the nearest rural locality.
