= Malinnik, Vologda Oblast =

Malinnik Малинник
- Village
- Location within Vologda Oblast Location within Russia
- Coordinates: 60°07′N 40°46′E
- Country: Russia
- Region: Vologda Oblast
- District: Syamzhensky District
- Time zone: UTC+3:00

Malinnik (Russian: Малинник) is a rural locality (a village) in Ustretskoye Rural Settlement, Syamzhensky District, Vologda Oblast, Russia. The population was 29 as of 2002.

== Geography ==
Malinnik is located 31 km northwest of Syamzha (the district's administrative centre) by road. Kubinskaya is the nearest rural locality.
