= Rogovitsynskaya =

Rogovitsynskaya Роговицынская
- Village
- Location within Vologda Oblast Location within Russia
- Coordinates: 60°18′N 41°31′E
- Country: Russia
- Region: Vologda Oblast
- District: Syamzhensky District
- Time zone: UTC+3:00

Rogovitsynskaya (Russian: Роговицынская) is a rural locality (a village) in Dvinitskoye Rural Settlement, Syamzhensky District, Vologda Oblast, Russia. The population was 20 as of 2002.

== Geography ==
Rogovitsynskaya is located 44 km northeast of Syamzha (the district's administrative centre) by road. Ignashevskaya is the nearest rural locality.
