= Anikovskaya =

Anikovskaya Аниковская
- Village
- Location within Vologda Oblast Location within Russia
- Coordinates: 60°01′N 40°43′E
- Country: Russia
- Region: Vologda Oblast
- District: Syamzhensky District
- Time zone: UTC+3:00

Anikovskaya (Russian: Аниковская) is a rural locality (a village) in Ustretskoye Rural Settlement, Syamzhensky District, Vologda Oblast, Russia. The population was 12 as of 2002.

== Geography ==
Anikovskaya is located 24 km west of Syamzha (the district's administrative centre) by road. Frolikha is the nearest rural locality.
