= Mininskaya, Syamzhensky District, Vologda Oblast =

Mininskaya Мининская
- Village
- Location within Vologda Oblast Location within Russia
- Coordinates: 60°14′N 40°58′E
- Country: Russia
- Region: Vologda Oblast
- District: Syamzhensky District
- Time zone: UTC+3:00

Mininskaya (Russian: Мининская) is a rural locality (a village) in Ramenskoye Rural Settlement, Syamzhensky District, Vologda Oblast, Russia. The population was 43 as of 2002.

== Geography ==
Mininskaya is located 48 km north of Syamzha (the district's administrative centre) by road. Markovskaya is the nearest rural locality.
