= Shirega =

Shirega Ширега
- Settlement
- Location within Vologda Oblast Location within Russia
- Coordinates: 60°10′N 41°15′E
- Country: Russia
- Region: Vologda Oblast
- District: Syamzhensky District
- Time zone: UTC+3:00

Shirega (Russian: Ширега) is a rural locality (a settlement) in Ramenskoye Rural Settlement, Syamzhensky District, Vologda Oblast, Russia. The population was 155 as of 2002.

== Geography ==
Shirega is located 23 km northeast of Syamzha (the district's administrative centre) by road.
