= Fedosikha =

Fedosikha Федосиха
- Village
- Location within Vologda Oblast Location within Russia
- Coordinates: 60°00′N 40°41′E
- Country: Russia
- Region: Vologda Oblast
- District: Syamzhensky District
- Time zone: UTC+3:00

Fedosikha (Russian: Федосиха) is a rural locality (a village) in Ustretskoye Rural Settlement, Syamzhensky District, Vologda Oblast, Russia. The population was 26 as of 2002.

== Geography ==
Fedosikha is located 27 km west of Syamzha (the district's administrative centre) by road. Burdukovo is the nearest rural locality.
