= Piligino =

Piligino Пилигино
- Village
- Location within Vologda Oblast Location within Russia
- Coordinates: 59°52′N 41°24′E
- Country: Russia
- Region: Vologda Oblast
- District: Syamzhensky District
- Time zone: UTC+3:00

Piligino (Russian: Пилигино) is a rural locality (a village) in Korobitsynskoye Rural Settlement, Syamzhensky District, Vologda Oblast, Russia. The population was 2 as of 2002.

== Geography ==
Piligino is located 62 km southeast of Syamzha (the district's administrative centre) by road. Shestakovskaya is the nearest rural locality.
