= Alferovskaya, Syamzhensky District, Vologda Oblast =

Alferovskaya Алферовская
- Village
- Location within Vologda Oblast Location within Russia
- Coordinates: 59°55′N 41°00′E
- Country: Russia
- Region: Vologda Oblast
- District: Syamzhensky District
- Time zone: UTC+3:00

Alferovskaya (Russian: Алферовская) is a rural locality (a village) in Zhityovskoye Rural Settlement, Syamzhensky District, Vologda Oblast, Russia. The population was 22 as of 2002.

== Geography ==
Alferovskaya is located 14 km southwest of Syamzha (the district's administrative centre) by road. Ploskovo is the nearest rural locality.
