= Shestakovskaya =

Shestakovskaya Шестаковская
- Village
- Location within Vologda Oblast Location within Russia
- Coordinates: 59°51′N 41°25′E
- Country: Russia
- Region: Vologda Oblast
- District: Syamzhensky District
- Time zone: UTC+3:00

Shestakovskaya (Russian: Шестаковская) is a rural locality (a village) in Korobitsynskoye Rural Settlement, Syamzhensky District, Vologda Oblast, Russia. The population was 5 as of 2002.

== Geography ==
Shestakovskaya is located 61 km southeast of Syamzha (the district's administrative centre) by road.
