= Kladovitsa =

Kladovitsa Кладовица
- Village
- Location within Vologda Oblast Location within Russia
- Coordinates: 60°04′N 40°46′E
- Country: Russia
- Region: Vologda Oblast
- District: Syamzhensky District
- Time zone: UTC+3:00

Kladovitsa (Russian: Кладовица) is a rural locality (a village) in Ustretskoye Rural Settlement, Syamzhensky District, Vologda Oblast, Russia. The population was 8 as of 2002.

== Geography ==
Kladovitsa is located 26 km northwest of Syamzha (the district's administrative centre) by road. Mokrovo is the nearest rural locality.
