= Kubinskaya, Syamzhensky District, Vologda Oblast =

Kubinskaya Кубинская
- Village
- Location within Vologda Oblast Location within Russia
- Coordinates: 60°06′N 40°46′E
- Country: Russia
- Region: Vologda Oblast
- District: Syamzhensky District
- Time zone: UTC+3:00

Kubinskaya (Russian: Кубинская) is a rural locality (a village) in Ustretskoye Rural Settlement, Syamzhensky District, Vologda Oblast, Russia. The population was 2 as of 2002.

== Geography ==
Kubinskaya is located 31 km northwest of Syamzha (the district's administrative centre) by road. Malinnik is the nearest rural locality.
