= Klokovo, Syamzhensky District, Vologda Oblast =

Klokovo Клоково
- Village
- Location within Vologda Oblast Location within Russia
- Coordinates: 60°08′N 40°53′E
- Country: Russia
- Region: Vologda Oblast
- District: Syamzhensky District
- Time zone: UTC+3:00

Klokovo (Russian: Клоково) is a rural locality (a village) in Ustretskoye Rural Settlement, Syamzhensky District, Vologda Oblast, Russia. The population was 9 as of 2002.

== Geography ==
Klokovo is located 30 km northwest of Syamzha (the district's administrative centre) by road. Puronga is the nearest rural locality.
