= Goluzino, Syamzhensky District, Vologda Oblast =

Goluzino Голузино
- Village
- Location within Vologda Oblast Location within Russia
- Coordinates: 59°53′N 41°33′E
- Country: Russia
- Region: Vologda Oblast
- District: Syamzhensky District
- Time zone: UTC+3:00

Goluzino (Russian: Голузино) is a rural locality (a village) in Korobitsynskoye Rural Settlement, Syamzhensky District, Vologda Oblast, Russia. The population was 75 as of 2002.

== Geography ==
Goluzino is located 53 km southeast of Syamzha (the district's administrative centre) by road. Klimushino is the nearest rural locality.
