= Podlesnaya, Vologda Oblast =

Podlesnaya Подлесная
- Village
- Location within Vologda Oblast Location within Russia
- Coordinates: 59°50′N 40°51′E
- Country: Russia
- Region: Vologda Oblast
- District: Syamzhensky District
- Time zone: UTC+3:00

Podlesnaya (Russian: Подлесная) is a rural locality (a village) in Zhityovskoye Rural Settlement, Syamzhensky District, Vologda Oblast, Russia. The population was 5 as of 2002.

== Geography ==
Podlesnaya is located 25 km southwest of Syamzha (the district's administrative centre) by road. Babino is the nearest rural locality.
