= Kononovskaya, Vologda Oblast =

Kononovskaya Кононовская
- Village
- Location within Vologda Oblast Location within Russia
- Coordinates: 60°14′N 41°39′E
- Country: Russia
- Region: Vologda Oblast
- District: Syamzhensky District
- Time zone: UTC+3:00

Kononovskaya (Russian: Кононовская) is a rural locality (a village) in Dvinitskoye Rural Settlement, Syamzhensky District, Vologda Oblast, Russia. The population was 63 as of 2002.

== Geography ==
Kononovskaya is located 54 km northeast of Syamzha (the district's administrative centre) by road. Samsonovskaya is the nearest rural locality.
