= Sobolikha, Vologda Oblast =

Sobolikha Соболиха
- Village
- Location within Vologda Oblast Location within Russia
- Coordinates: 59°54′N 41°03′E
- Country: Russia
- Region: Vologda Oblast
- District: Syamzhensky District
- Time zone: UTC+3:00

Sobolikha (Russian: Соболиха) is a rural locality (a village) in Zhityovskoye Rural Settlement, Syamzhensky District, Vologda Oblast, Russia. The population was 3 as of 2002.

== Geography ==
Sobolikha is located 18 km south of Syamzha (the district's administrative centre) by road. Yarygino is the nearest rural locality.
