= Yevsyutino =

Yevsyutino Евсютино
- Village
- Location within Vologda Oblast Location within Russia
- Coordinates: 59°56′N 41°35′E
- Country: Russia
- Region: Vologda Oblast
- District: Syamzhensky District
- Time zone: UTC+3:00

Yevsyutino (Russian: Евсютино) is a rural locality (a village) in Korobitsynskoye Rural Settlement, Syamzhensky District, Vologda Oblast, Russia. The population was 8 as of 2002.

== Geography ==
Yevsyutino is located 47 km southeast of Syamzha (the district's administrative centre) by road. Yezdunya is the nearest rural locality.
