= Lyubovitsa =

Lyubovitsa Любовица
- Village
- Location within Vologda Oblast Location within Russia
- Coordinates: 60°06′N 40°49′E
- Country: Russia
- Region: Vologda Oblast
- District: Syamzhensky District
- Time zone: UTC+3:00

Lyubovitsa (Russian: Любовица) is a rural locality (a village) in Ustretskoye Rural Settlement, Syamzhensky District, Vologda Oblast, Russia. The population was 15 as of 2002.

== Geography ==
Lyubovitsa is located 30 km northwest of Syamzha (the district's administrative centre) by road. Rechkovskaya is the nearest rural locality.
