= Kocherzhikha =

Kocherzhikha Кочержиха
- Village
- Location within Vologda Oblast Location within Russia
- Coordinates: 60°05′N 40°49′E
- Country: Russia
- Region: Vologda Oblast
- District: Syamzhensky District
- Time zone: UTC+3:00

Kocherzhikha (Russian: Кочержиха) is a rural locality (a village) in Ustretskoye Rural Settlement, Syamzhensky District, Vologda Oblast, Russia. The population was 6 as of 2002.

== Geography ==
Kocherzhikha is located 29 km northwest of Syamzha (the district's administrative centre) by road. Rechkovskaya is the nearest rural locality.
