= Pestino =

Pestino Пестино
- Village
- Location within Vologda Oblast Location within Russia
- Coordinates: 59°59′N 41°36′E
- Country: Russia
- Region: Vologda Oblast
- District: Syamzhensky District
- Time zone: UTC+3:00

Pestino (Russian: Пестино) is a rural locality (a village) in Korobitsynskoye Rural Settlement, Syamzhensky District, Vologda Oblast, Russia. The population was 2 as of 2002.

== Geography ==
Pestino is located 41 km southeast of Syamzha (the district's administrative centre) by road. Vysokovo is the nearest rural locality.
