= Myakotikha =

Myakotikha Мякотиха
- Village
- Location within Vologda Oblast Location within Russia
- Coordinates: 59°55′N 41°03′E
- Country: Russia
- Region: Vologda Oblast
- District: Syamzhensky District
- Municipality: Syamzhensky Municipal Okrug
- Time zone: UTC+3:00

Myakotikha (Russian: Мякотиха) is a rural locality (a village) in Syamzhensky District, Vologda Oblast, Russia. The population was 4 as of the 2002 Census. Until December 2015, the village was part of Zhityovskoye Rural Settlement; that settlement was then merged into Noginskoye Rural Settlement, which itself was dissolved in 2022 when Syamzhensky Municipal District was reorganized as Syamzhensky Municipal Okrug.

== Etymology ==
The name derives from the medieval Russian personal nickname Myakota (Мякота), which is attested on Novgorod lands; an Ivan Prasolov Myakota is recorded in Novgorod in the early 16th century, and landowners surnamed Myakotevy are documented in the Obonezhye region. The nickname itself derives from the dialectal noun myakotina (мякотина), which in northern Russian dialects denoted rye bread made from sifted flour or a kind of pirog. A 1678 writers' book of Vologda Uyezd records the village under both its current name and the older form Myakotinikha (Мякотиниха).

== Geography ==
Myakotikha is located 19 km south of Syamzha (the district's administrative centre) by road. Sobolikha is the nearest rural locality.

== History ==
In October 2024, the village's sole remaining permanent resident, a 48-year-old woman, died in an overnight house fire; the absence of nearby neighbours delayed any call to the emergency services.
