= Chirkovskaya =

Chirkovskaya Чирковская
- Village
- Location within Vologda Oblast Location within Russia
- Coordinates: 60°01′N 41°30′E
- Country: Russia
- Region: Vologda Oblast
- District: Syamzhensky District
- Time zone: UTC+3:00

Chirkovskaya (Russian: Чирковская) is a rural locality (a village) in Korobitsynskoye Rural Settlement, Syamzhensky District, Vologda Oblast, Russia. The population was 25 as of 2002.

== Geography ==
Chirkovskaya is located 34 km east of Syamzha (the district's administrative centre) by road. Shishakovo is the nearest rural locality.
