= Olekhovskaya, Syamzhensky District, Vologda Oblast =

Olekhovskaya Олеховская
- Village
- Location within Vologda Oblast Location within Russia
- Coordinates: 60°01′N 41°00′E
- Country: Russia
- Region: Vologda Oblast
- District: Syamzhensky District
- Time zone: UTC+3:00

Olekhovskaya (Russian: Олеховская) is a rural locality (a village) in Noginskoye Rural Settlement, Syamzhensky District, Vologda Oblast, Russia. The population was 32 as of 2002.

== Geography ==
Olekhovskaya is located 5 km northwest of Syamzha (the district's administrative centre) by road. Trusikha is the nearest rural locality.
