= Semenikha =

Semenikha Семениха
- Village
- Location within Vologda Oblast Location within Russia
- Coordinates: 59°59′N 41°04′E
- Country: Russia
- Region: Vologda Oblast
- District: Syamzhensky District
- Time zone: UTC+3:00

Semenikha (Russian: Семениха) is a rural locality (a village) in Noginskoye Rural Settlement, Syamzhensky District, Vologda Oblast, Russia. The population was 2 as of 2002.

== Geography ==
Semenikha is located 4 km south of Syamzha (the district's administrative centre) by road. Syamzha is the nearest rural locality.
