= Borok-2 =

Borok-2 Борок-2
- Village
- Location within Vologda Oblast Location within Russia
- Coordinates: 60°08′N 40°56′E
- Country: Russia
- Region: Vologda Oblast
- District: Syamzhensky District
- Time zone: UTC+3:00

Borok-2 (Russian: Борок-2) is a rural locality (a village) in Ustretskoye Rural Settlement, Syamzhensky District, Vologda Oblast, Russia. The population was 8 as of 2002.

== Geography ==
Borok-2 is located 29 km northwest of Syamzha (the district's administrative centre) by road. Borok-1 is the nearest rural locality.
