= Ust-Reka =

Ust-Reka Усть-Река
- Selo
- Location within Vologda Oblast Location within Russia
- Coordinates: 60°02′N 40°46′E
- Country: Russia
- Region: Vologda Oblast
- District: Syamzhensky District
- Time zone: UTC+3:00

Ust-Reka (Russian: Усть-Река) is a rural locality (a selo) and the administrative center of Ustretskoye Rural Settlement, Syamzhensky District, Vologda Oblast, Russia. The population was 5 as of 2002. There are 4 streets.

== Geography ==
Ust-Reka is located 21 km west of Syamzha (the district's administrative centre) by road. Kuzminskaya is the nearest rural locality.
