= Samsonovskaya =

Samsonovskaya Самсоновская
- Village
- Location within Vologda Oblast Location within Russia
- Coordinates: 60°14′N 41°38′E
- Country: Russia
- Region: Vologda Oblast
- District: Syamzhensky District
- Time zone: UTC+3:00

Samsonovskaya (Russian: Самсоновская) is a rural locality (a village) and the administrative center of Dvinitskoye Rural Settlement, Syamzhensky District, Vologda Oblast, Russia. The population was 180 as of 2002. There are 3 streets.

== Geography ==
Samsonovskaya is located 53 km northeast of Syamzha (the district's administrative centre) by road. Kononovskaya is the nearest rural locality.
