= Yukovskaya =

Yukovskaya Юковская
- Village
- Location within Vologda Oblast Location within Russia
- Coordinates: 60°06′N 41°16′E
- Country: Russia
- Region: Vologda Oblast
- District: Syamzhensky District
- Time zone: UTC+3:00

Yukovskaya (Russian: Юковская) is a rural locality (a village) in Noginskoye Rural Settlement, Syamzhensky District, Vologda Oblast, Russia. The population was 3 as of 2002.

== Geography ==
Yukovskaya is located 16 km northeast of Syamzha (the district's administrative centre) by road. Dokukinskaya is the nearest rural locality.
