= Chizhovo, Vologda Oblast =

Chizhovo Чижово
- Village
- Location within Vologda Oblast Location within Russia
- Coordinates: 60°01′N 41°37′E
- Country: Russia
- Region: Vologda Oblast
- District: Syamzhensky District
- Time zone: UTC+3:00

Chizhovo (Russian: Чижово) is a rural locality (a village) in Korobitsynskoye Rural Settlement, Syamzhensky District, Vologda Oblast, Russia. The population was 3 as of 2002.

== Geography ==
Chizhovo is located 41 km east of Syamzha (the district's administrative centre) by road. Podgornaya is the nearest rural locality.
