= Pigilinskaya =

Pigilinskaya Пигилинская
- Village
- Location within Vologda Oblast Location within Russia
- Coordinates: 60°08′N 41°05′E
- Country: Russia
- Region: Vologda Oblast
- District: Syamzhensky District
- Time zone: UTC+3:00

Pigilinskaya (Russian: Пигилинская) is a rural locality (a village) in Noginskoye Rural Settlement, Syamzhensky District, Vologda Oblast, Russia. The population was 95 as of 2002.

== Geography ==
Pigilinskaya is located 18 km north of Syamzha (the district's administrative centre) by road. Davydovskaya is the nearest rural locality.
