= Nesterikha, Syamzhensky District, Vologda Oblast =

Nesterikha Нестериха
- Village
- Location within Vologda Oblast Location within Russia
- Coordinates: 60°00′N 40°59′E
- Country: Russia
- Region: Vologda Oblast
- District: Syamzhensky District
- Time zone: UTC+3:00

Nesterikha (Russian: Нестериха) is a rural locality (a village) in Noginskoye Rural Settlement, Syamzhensky District, Vologda Oblast, Russia. The population was 6 as of 2002.

== Geography ==
Nesterikha is located 8 km west of Syamzha (the district's administrative centre) by road. Noginskaya is the nearest rural locality.
