= Gridino, Syamzhensky District, Vologda Oblast =

Gridino Гридино
- Village
- Location within Vologda Oblast Location within Russia
- Coordinates: 60°09′N 41°34′E
- Country: Russia
- Region: Vologda Oblast
- District: Syamzhensky District
- Time zone: UTC+3:00

Gridino (Russian: Гридино) is a rural locality (a village) in Rezhskoye Rural Settlement, Syamzhensky District, Vologda Oblast, Russia. The population was 152 as of 2002. There are 6 streets.

== Geography ==
Gridino is located 40 km northeast of Syamzha (the district's administrative centre) by road. Rassokhino is the nearest rural locality.
