= Vakhrushevskaya =

Vakhrushevskaya Вахрушевская
- Village
- Location within Vologda Oblast Location within Russia
- Coordinates: 60°15′N 41°37′E
- Country: Russia
- Region: Vologda Oblast
- District: Syamzhensky District
- Time zone: UTC+3:00

Vakhrushevskaya (Russian: Вахрушевская) is a rural locality (a village) in Dvinitskoye Rural Settlement, Syamzhensky District, Vologda Oblast, Russia. The population was 26 as of 2002.

== Geography ==
Vakhrushevskaya is located 52 km northeast of Syamzha (the district's administrative centre) by road. Nikulinskaya is the nearest rural locality.
