= Shubachevo =

Shubachevo Шубачево
- Village
- Location within Vologda Oblast Location within Russia
- Coordinates: 59°53′N 41°12′E
- Country: Russia
- Region: Vologda Oblast
- District: Syamzhensky District
- Time zone: UTC+3:00

Shubachevo (Russian: Шубачево) is a rural locality (a village) in Zhityovskoye Rural Settlement, Syamzhensky District, Vologda Oblast, Russia. The population was 7 as of 2002.

== Geography ==
Shubachevo is located 27 km southeast of Syamzha (the district's administrative centre) by road. Levinskaya is the nearest rural locality.
