= Rassokhino =

Rassokhino Рассохино
- Village
- Location within Vologda Oblast Location within Russia
- Coordinates: 60°08′N 41°34′E
- Country: Russia
- Region: Vologda Oblast
- District: Syamzhensky District
- Time zone: UTC+3:00

Rassokhino (Russian: Рассохино) is a rural locality (a village) in Rezhskoye Rural Settlement, Syamzhensky District, Vologda Oblast, Russia. The population was 66 as of 2002. There are 4 streets.

== Geography ==
Rassokhino is located 39 km southeast of Syamzha (the district's administrative centre) by road. Gridino is the nearest rural locality.
