= Zalesye, Syamzhensky District, Vologda Oblast =

Zalesye Залесье
- Village
- Location within Vologda Oblast Location within Russia
- Coordinates: 59°52′N 41°02′E
- Country: Russia
- Region: Vologda Oblast
- District: Syamzhensky District
- Time zone: UTC+3:00

Zalesye (Russian: Залесье) is a rural locality (a village) in Zhityovskoye Rural Settlement, Syamzhensky District, Vologda Oblast, Russia. The population was 21 as of 2002.

== Geography ==
Zalesye is located 25 km south of Syamzha (the district's administrative centre) by road. Alexeyevskaya is the nearest rural locality.
