= Borok-1 =

Borok-1 Борок-1
- Village
- Location within Vologda Oblast Location within Russia
- Coordinates: 60°08′N 40°55′E
- Country: Russia
- Region: Vologda Oblast
- District: Syamzhensky District
- Time zone: UTC+3:00

Borok-1 (Russian: Борок-1) is a rural locality (a village) in Ustretskoye Rural Settlement, Syamzhensky District, Vologda Oblast, Russia. The population was 32 as of 2002.

== Geography ==
Borok-1 is located 29 km northwest of Syamzha (the district's administrative centre) by road. Borok-2 is the nearest rural locality.
