= Pogorelets, Vologda Oblast =

Pogorelets Погорелец
- Village
- Location within Vologda Oblast Location within Russia
- Coordinates: 60°06′N 41°31′E
- Country: Russia
- Region: Vologda Oblast
- District: Syamzhensky District
- Time zone: UTC+3:00

Pogorelets (Russian: Погорелец) is a rural locality (a village) in Rezhskoye Rural Settlement, Syamzhensky District, Vologda Oblast, Russia. The population was 8 as of 2002.

== Geography ==
Pogorelets is located 34 km northeast of Syamzha (the district's administrative centre) by road. Slobodka is the nearest rural locality.
