= Korostelevo =

Korostelevo Коростелево
- Village
- Location within Vologda Oblast Location within Russia
- Coordinates: 60°01′N 41°28′E
- Country: Russia
- Region: Vologda Oblast
- District: Syamzhensky District
- Time zone: UTC+3:00

Korostelevo (Russian: Коростелево) is a rural locality (a village) in Korobitsynskoye Rural Settlement, Syamzhensky District, Vologda Oblast, Russia. The population was 75 as of 2002.

== Geography ==
Korostelevo is located 35 km east of Syamzha (the district's administrative centre) by road. Shishakovo is the nearest rural locality.
