= Yezdunya =

Yezdunya Ездунья
- Village
- Location within Vologda Oblast Location within Russia
- Coordinates: 59°55′N 41°34′E
- Country: Russia
- Region: Vologda Oblast
- District: Syamzhensky District
- Time zone: UTC+3:00

Yezdunya (Russian: Ездунья) is a rural locality (a village) in Korobitsynskoye Rural Settlement, Syamzhensky District, Vologda Oblast, Russia. The population was 13 as of 2002.

== Geography ==
Yezdunya is located 49 km southeast of Syamzha (the district's administrative centre) by road. Sidorovo is the nearest rural locality.
