= Ikonnikovo, Syamzhensky District, Vologda Oblast =

Ikonnikovo Иконниково
- Village
- Location within Vologda Oblast Location within Russia
- Coordinates: 60°15′N 41°02′E
- Country: Russia
- Region: Vologda Oblast
- District: Syamzhensky District
- Time zone: UTC+3:00

Ikonnikovo (Russian: Иконниково) is a rural locality (a village) in Ramenskoye Rural Settlement, Syamzhensky District, Vologda Oblast, Russia. The population was 12 as of 2002.

== Geography ==
Ikonnikovo is located 43 km north of Syamzha (the district's administrative centre) by road. Oparikha is the nearest rural locality.
