= Orlovskaya, Syamzhensky District, Vologda Oblast =

Orlovskaya Орловская
- Village
- Location within Vologda Oblast Location within Russia
- Coordinates: 60°13′N 41°40′E
- Country: Russia
- Region: Vologda Oblast
- District: Syamzhensky District
- Time zone: UTC+3:00

Orlovskaya (Russian: Орловская) is a rural locality (a village) in Dvinitskoye Rural Settlement, Syamzhensky District, Vologda Oblast, Russia. The population was 34 as of 2002.

== Geography ==
Orlovskaya is located 58 km northeast of Syamzha (the district's administrative centre) by road. Zakharovskaya is the nearest rural locality.
