= 6 km =

6 km may refer to:

- 6 km in Cross country running
- 6 km (village)
