= Druzhba, Vologda Oblast =

Druzhba Дружба
- Settlement
- Location within Vologda Oblast Location within Russia
- Coordinates: 59°53′N 41°47′E
- Country: Russia
- Region: Vologda Oblast
- District: Syamzhensky District
- Time zone: UTC+3:00

Druzhba (Russian: Дружба) is a rural locality (a settlement) in Korobitsynskoye Rural Settlement, Syamzhensky District, Vologda Oblast, Russia. The population was 111 as of 2002. There are 3 streets.

== Geography ==
Druzhba is located 62 km southeast of Syamzha (the district's administrative centre) by road.
