= Davydovskaya, Syamzhensky District, Vologda Oblast =

Davydovskaya Давыдовская
- Village
- Location within Vologda Oblast Location within Russia
- Coordinates: 60°00′N 41°06′E
- Country: Russia
- Region: Vologda Oblast
- District: Syamzhensky District
- Time zone: UTC+3:00

Davydovskaya (Russian: Давыдовская) is a rural locality (a village) in Noginskoye Rural Settlement, Syamzhensky District, Vologda Oblast, Russia. The population was 107 as of 2002.

== Geography ==
Davydovskaya is located 3 km southeast of Syamzha (the district's administrative centre) by road. Syamzha is the nearest rural locality.
