= Dyakovsky =

Dyakovsky (Russian: Дьяковский; masculine), Dyakovskaya (Дьяковская; feminine), or Dyakovskoye (Дьяковское; neuter) is the name of several rural localities in Russia:

- Dyakovskoye, Lomovsky Rural Okrug, Rybinsky District, Yaroslavl Oblast, a village in Lomovsky Rural Okrug of Rybinsky District of Yaroslavl Oblast
- Dyakovskoye, Nazarovsky Rural Okrug, Rybinsky District, Yaroslavl Oblast, a village in Nazarovsky Rural Okrug of Rybinsky District of Yaroslavl Oblast
- Dyakovskaya, Arkhangelsk Oblast, a village in Shonoshsky Selsoviet of Velsky District of Arkhangelsk Oblast
- Dyakovskaya, Vologda Oblast, a village in Kharovsky Selsoviet of Kharovsky District of Vologda Oblast
