= Volkhovskaya =

Volkhovskaya Волховская
- Village
- Location within Vologda Oblast Location within Russia
- Coordinates: 59°59′N 41°02′E
- Country: Russia
- Region: Vologda Oblast
- District: Syamzhensky District
- Time zone: UTC+3:00

Volkhovskaya (Russian: Волховская) is a rural locality (a village) in Noginskoye Rural Settlement, Syamzhensky District, Vologda Oblast, Russia. The population was 25 as of 2002.

== Geography ==
Volkhovskaya is located 5 km southwest of Syamzha (the district's administrative centre) by road. Noginskaya is the nearest rural locality.
