= Klepikovsky =

Klepikovsky (masculine), Klepikovskaya (feminine), or Klepikovskoye (neuter) may refer to:

- Klepikovsky District, a district of Ryazan Oblast, Russia
- Klepikovskaya, a rural locality (a village) in Vologda Oblast, Russia
