= Klepikovskaya =

Klepikovskaya Клепиковская
- Village
- Location within Vologda Oblast Location within Russia
- Coordinates: 60°13′N 41°07′E
- Country: Russia
- Region: Vologda Oblast
- District: Syamzhensky District
- Time zone: UTC+3:00

Klepikovskaya (Russian: Клепиковская) is a rural locality (a village) in Ramenskoye Rural Settlement, Syamzhensky District, Vologda Oblast, Russia. The population was 26 as of 2002.

== Geography ==
Klepikovskaya is located 38 km north of Syamzha (the district's administrative centre) by road. Lodyzhenskaya is the nearest rural locality.

== Attractions ==
There are no attractions in Klepikovskaya according to Google Maps.
