= Derevenka Shapshinskaya =

Derevenka Shapshinskaya Деревенька Шапшинская
- Village
- Location within Vologda Oblast Location within Russia
- Coordinates: 60°10′N 39°52′E
- Country: Russia
- Region: Vologda Oblast
- District: Kharovsky District
- Time zone: UTC+3:00

Derevenka Shapshinskaya (Russian: Деревенька Шапшинская) is a rural locality (a village) in Shapshinskoye Rural Settlement, Kharovsky District, Vologda Oblast, Russia. The population was 1 as of 2002.

== Geography ==
Derevenka Shapshinskaya is located 36 km northwest of Kharovsk (the district's administrative centre) by road. Shutovo is the nearest rural locality.
