= Syamzhena =

Syamzhena Сямжена (Russian)
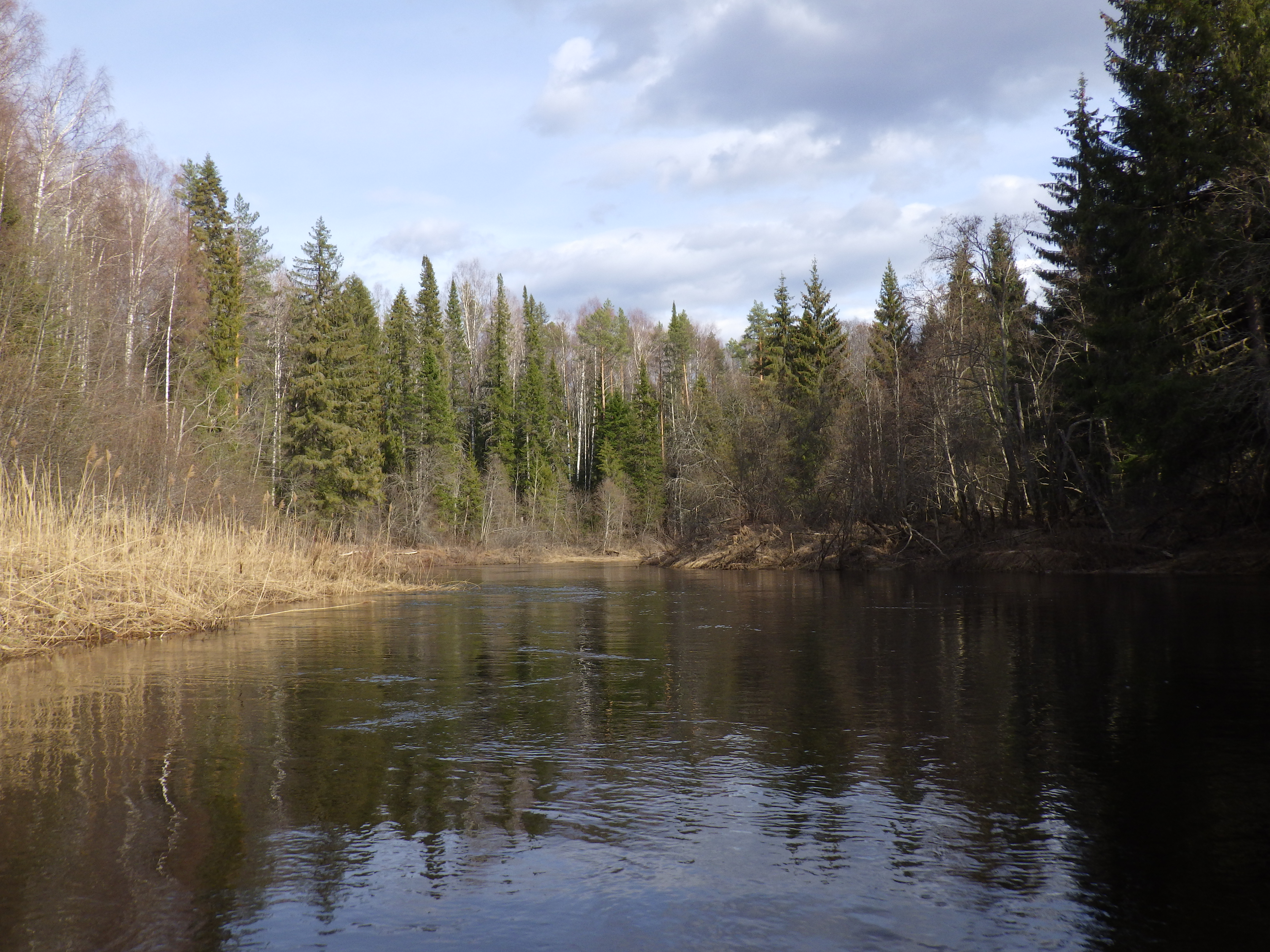

Location
- Country: Russia

Physical characteristics
- Mouth: Kubena
  - coordinates: 60°02′16″N 40°45′25″E
  - elevation: 128 m (420 ft)
- Length: 117 km (73 mi)
- Basin size: 1,930 km^{2} (750 sq mi)

Basin features
- Progression: Kubena→ Lake Kubenskoye→ Sukhona→ Northern Dvina→ White Sea

The Syamzhena (Russian: Сямжена) is a river in Sokolsky and Syamzhensky Districts of Vologda Oblast in Russia. It is a left tributary of the Kubena. It is 117 kilometres (73 mi) long, and the area of its basin 1,930 square kilometres (750 sq mi). Its main tributaries are the Shichenga (right) and the Bolshoy Pungul (right). The center of Syamzhensky District, the selo of Syamzha, is located on both banks of the Syamzhena.

The name of the Syamzhena originates from Finnic languages and means "moss water" or "water from the swamp". The names of Syamzhensky District and its center, the selo of Syamzha (which was established in 1935 by merging a number of villages at the crossing of the Syamzhena by the highway connecting Vologda and Arkhangelsk) are derived from the Syamzhena.

The river basin of the Syamzhena comprises the south and the center of Syamzhensky District, as well as the northeastern part of Sokolsky District and minor areas in the west of Totemsky District. A relatively big lake, Lake Shichengskoye, drains into the Shichenga River and thus belongs to the river basin of the Syamzhena.

The source of the Syamzhena is located in the northeast of Sokolsky District. The upper course of the river runs across the gilly landscape of glacial origin (Kharovsk Ridge), with the heights between 160 metres (520 ft) and 190 metres (620 ft). In Sokolsky District, the Syamzhena flows west, further it turns north and enters Syamzhensky District, and at the confluence of the Shichenga from the right the river turns west again. The mouth of the Syamzhena is located in the village of Ust-Reka.
