= Derevenka, Kharovsky District, Vologda Oblast =

Derevenka Деревенька
- Village
- Location within Vologda Oblast Location within Russia
- Coordinates: 59°57′N 39°56′E
- Country: Russia
- Region: Vologda Oblast
- District: Kharovsky District
- Time zone: UTC+3:00

Derevenka (Russian: Деревенька) is a rural locality (a village) in Kubenskoye Rural Settlement, Kharovsky District, Vologda Oblast, Russia. The population was 13 as of 2002.

== Geography ==
Derevenka is located 29 km west of Kharovsk (the district's administrative centre) by road. Afonikha is the nearest rural locality.
