= Kubena =

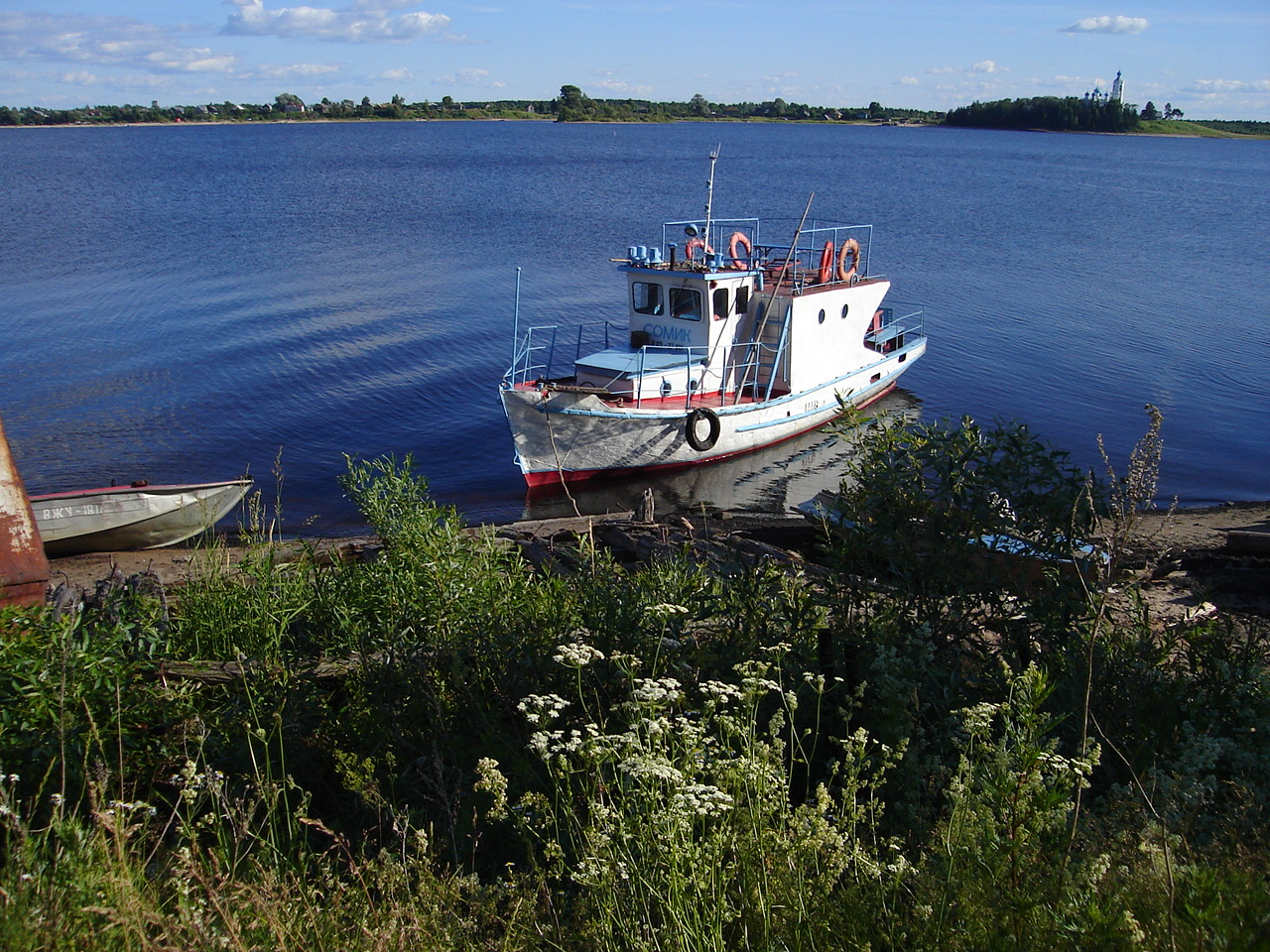
- Native name: Кубена (Russian)

Location
- Country: Russia

Physical characteristics
- Source
  - location: Konosha heights
- Mouth: Lake Kubenskoye
  - coordinates: 59°35′20″N 39°37′20″E
  - elevation: 110 m (360 ft)
- Length: 368 km (229 mi)
- Basin size: 11,000 km^{2} (4,200 sq mi)
- Discharge
  - average: 52.2 m^{3}/s (1,840 cu ft/s)

Basin features
- Progression: Lake Kubenskoye→ Sukhona→ Northern Dvina→ White Sea

Map of the Northern Dvina basin. The Kubena is shown on the map.

The Kubena (Russian: Кубена) is a river in Konoshsky District of Arkhangelsk Oblast and Vozhegodsky, Syamzhensky, Kharovsky, Sokolsky, and Ust-Kubinsky Districts of Vologda Oblast in Russia. It is 368 kilometres (229 mi) long, and the area of its basin 11,000 square kilometres (4,200 sq mi). The Kubena is the principal tributary of Lake Kubenskoye and belongs to the basins of the Sukhona and the White Sea. Its main tributaries are the Syamzhena (left) and the Sit (right).

The town of Kharovsk is situated on the left bank of the river. The selo of Ustye, Ust-Kubinsky District, Vologda Oblast, and administrative center of Ust-Kubinsky District, is located in the mouth of the Kubena.

The river basin of the Kubena comprises vast areas in the center of Vologda Oblast and in the south of Arkhangelsk oblast and separates the river basins of the Onega in the west and the Vaga in the east. Four district centers of Vologda Oblast, Syamzha, Kharovsk, and Ustye, are located in the basin of the Kubena.

The source of the Kubena is located in the hills south of the settlement of Konosha. The river flows south, enters Vologda Oblast, turns northeast and crosses Vozhegodsky District, turning south, and eventually southwest. It accepts the Syamzhena from the left and turns west. Downstream of the town of Kharovsk the Kubena accepts the Sit from the right and eventually turns southwest. Exiting Kharovsky District, a stretch of the Kubena forms the border between Ust-Kubinsky District (right) and Sokolsky District (left). Further the Kubena enters Ust-Kubinsky district and empties into Lake Kubenskoye, forming a river delta.

The lowest stretch of the Kubena of the length of 21 kilometres (13 mi) is listed in State Water Register of Russia as navigable, however, there is no passenger navigation.
