= 6 km, Vologda Oblast =

6 km 6 км
- Settlement
- Location within Vologda Oblast Location within Russia
- Coordinates: 59.809167°N 40.258889°E
- Country: Russia
- Region: Vologda Oblast
- District: Kharovsky District
- Time zone: UTC+05:00

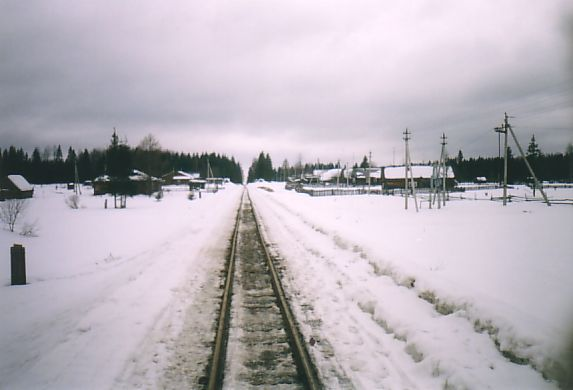
The village center, 6 kilometers away. View to the west. Semigorodnaya narrow-gauge railway. Kharovsky District, Vologda Oblast.

6 km (Russian: 6 км) is a rural locality (a settlement) in Semigorodneye Rural Settlement of Kharovsky District, Russia. The population was 49 as of 2002.

== Geography ==
6 km is located 31 km (19 mi) south of Kharovsk (the district's administrative centre) by road. Semigorodnyaya is the nearest rural locality.

== Streets ==
There are no streets with titles.
