= Yarygino, Syamzhensky District, Vologda Oblast =

Yarygino Ярыгино
- Village
- Location within Vologda Oblast Location within Russia
- Coordinates: 59°54′N 41°03′E
- Country: Russia
- Region: Vologda Oblast
- District: Syamzhensky District
- Time zone: UTC+3:00

Yarygino (Russian: Ярыгино) is a rural locality (a village) in Zhityovskoye Rural Settlement, Syamzhensky District, Vologda Oblast, Russia. The population was 3 as of 2002.

== Geography ==
Yarygino is located 17 km south of Syamzha (the district's administrative centre) by road. Sobolikha is the nearest rural locality.
