= Derevenka, Vozhegodsky District, Vologda Oblast =

Derevenka Деревенька
- Village
- Location within Vologda Oblast Location within Russia
- Coordinates: 60°29′N 40°57′E
- Country: Russia
- Region: Vologda Oblast
- District: Vozhegodsky District
- Time zone: UTC+3:00

Derevenka (Russian: Деревенька) is a rural locality (a village) and the administrative center of Nizhneslobodskoye Rural Settlement, Vozhegodsky District, Vologda Oblast, Russia. The population was 226 as of 2002.

== Geography ==
Derevenka is located 47 km east of Vozhega (the district's administrative centre) by road. Chernovskaya is the nearest rural locality.
