= Davydovskaya, Tarnogsky District, Vologda Oblast =

Davydovskaya Давыдовская
- Village
- Location within Vologda Oblast Location within Russia
- Coordinates: 60°27′N 42°59′E
- Country: Russia
- Region: Vologda Oblast
- District: Tarnogsky District
- Time zone: UTC+3:00

Davydovskaya (Russian: Давыдовская) is a rural locality (a village) in Verkhovskoye Rural Settlement, Tarnogsky District, Vologda Oblast, Russia. The population was 3 as of 2002.

== Geography ==
Davydovskaya is located 38 km west of Tarnogsky Gorodok (the district's administrative centre) by road. Yafanovskaya is the nearest rural locality.
