= Derevenka, Vologodsky District, Vologda Oblast =

Derevenka Деревенька
- Village
- Location within Vologda Oblast Location within Russia
- Coordinates: 59°17′N 39°30′E
- Country: Russia
- Region: Vologda Oblast
- District: Vologodsky District
- Time zone: UTC+3:00

Derevenka (Russian: Деревенька) is a rural locality (a village) in Mayskoye Rural Settlement, Vologodsky District, Vologda Oblast, Russia. The population was 11 as of 2002.

== Geography ==
The village is located on Pochenga river. The distance to Vologda is 25km, to Maysky is 14 km. Gorka, Zarya, Strelkovo, Goncharka and Kovylevo are the nearest localities.
