= Derevenka, Teplogorskoye Rural Settlement, Velikoustyugsky District, Vologda Oblast =

Derevenka Деревенька
- Village
- Location within Vologda Oblast Location within Russia
- Coordinates: 60°26′N 46°36′E
- Country: Russia
- Region: Vologda Oblast
- District: Velikoustyugsky District
- Time zone: UTC+3:00

Derevenka (Russian: Деревенька) is a rural locality (a village) in Teplogorskoye Rural Settlement, Velikoustyugsky District, Vologda Oblast, Russia. The population was 4 as of 2002.

== Geography ==
The distance to Veliky Ustyug is 65 km, to Teplogorye is 5 km. Yeremeyevo is the nearest rural locality.
