= Kharovsk =

Town in Vologda Oblast, Russia

Kharovsk Харовск
- Town
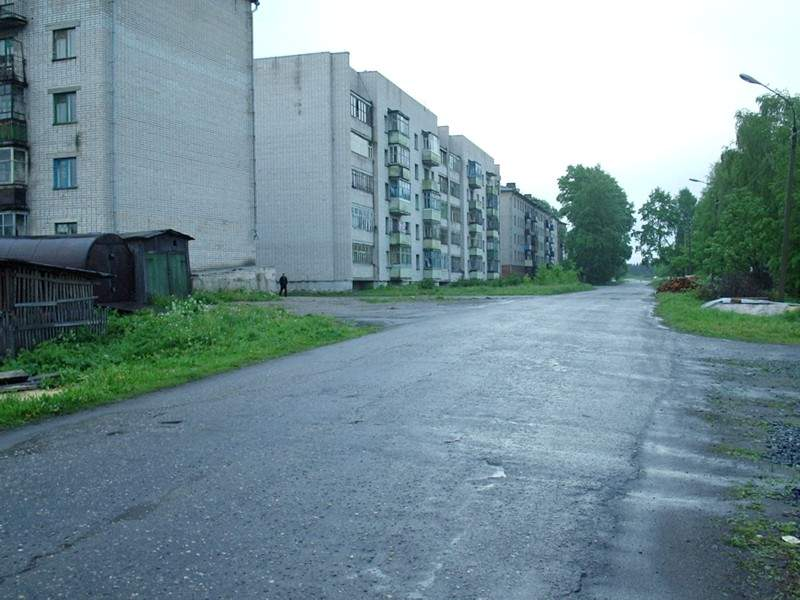
- In Kharovsk

- Coat of arms
- Interactive map of Kharovsk
- Location of Kharovsk Kharovsk (Vologda Oblast)
- Coordinates: 59°57′N 40°12′E
- Country: Russia
- Federal subject: Vologda Oblast
- Administrative district: Kharovsky District
- Town of district significanceSelsoviet: Kharovsk
- Founded: 1903
- Town status since: 1954
- Elevation: 160 m (520 ft)

Population (2010 Census)
  - Total: 10,079
  - Estimate (2023): 8,361 (−17%)

Administrative status
  - Capital of: Kharovsky District, town of district significance of Kharovsk

Municipal status
  - Municipal district: Kharovsky Municipal District
  - Urban settlement: Kharovsk Urban Settlement
  - Capital of: Kharovsky Municipal District, Kharovsk Urban Settlement
- Time zone: UTC+3 (MSK)
- Postal codes: 162250, 162251
- OKTMO ID: 19652101001

Kharovsk (Russian: Ха́ровск) is a town and the administrative center of Kharovsky District in Vologda Oblast, Russia, located on the left bank of the Kubena River, 90 kilometers (56 mi) north of Vologda, the administrative center of the oblast. Population: 10,079 (2010 census); 11,460 (2002 census); 13,083 (1989 Soviet census).

== History ==
In 1894, the construction of the railway line between Vologda and Arkhangelsk started. It was decided that the railway should run over the shortest route rather than pass through existing settlements, and it was eventually built through the current location of Kharovsk. Kubino railway station, which was later renamed Leshchevo, was opened in this location in 1894; the station was renamed Kharovskaya in 1914.

The settlement of Kharovskaya (Харовская), also known as Kharovsky (Харовский), was founded in 1903 in relation with the construction of a glass factory. In 1919, a saw mill was built. Kharovsky belonged to Kadnikovsky Uyezd in Vologda Governorate.

On July 15, 1929, the uyezds were abolished, the governorates merged into Northern Krai, and Kharovsky District was established. In 1932, Kharovskaya, the administrative center of the district, was granted work settlement status. Construction of a number of industrial enterprises followed, including a milk factory. In 1954, Kharovskaya was granted town status and given its present name.

== Administrative and municipal status ==
Within the framework of administrative divisions, Kharovsk serves as the administrative center of Kharovsky District. As an administrative division, it is incorporated within Kharovsky District as the town of district significance of Kharovsk. As a municipal division, the town of district significance of Kharovsk is incorporated within Kharovsky Municipal District as Kharovsk Urban Settlement.

== Economy ==
=== Industry ===
Kharovsk hosts timber industry and food industry enterprises.

=== Transportation ===
Kharovsk is located on the railway connecting Vologda and Arkhangelsk, which crosses the district from the south to the north, and is served by Kharovskaya railway station.

Roads connect Kharovsk with Syamzha in the east and Sokol in the south.

== Culture and recreation ==
The only museum in Kharovsk is the Kharovsk Museum of Art and History which was founded in 1967 and reopened in 2000.

== Sports ==
One of the races of the Motocross Cup of Russia is held in July every year close to Kharovsk.
