= Syamzhensky District =

Syamzhensky District Сямженский район
- District
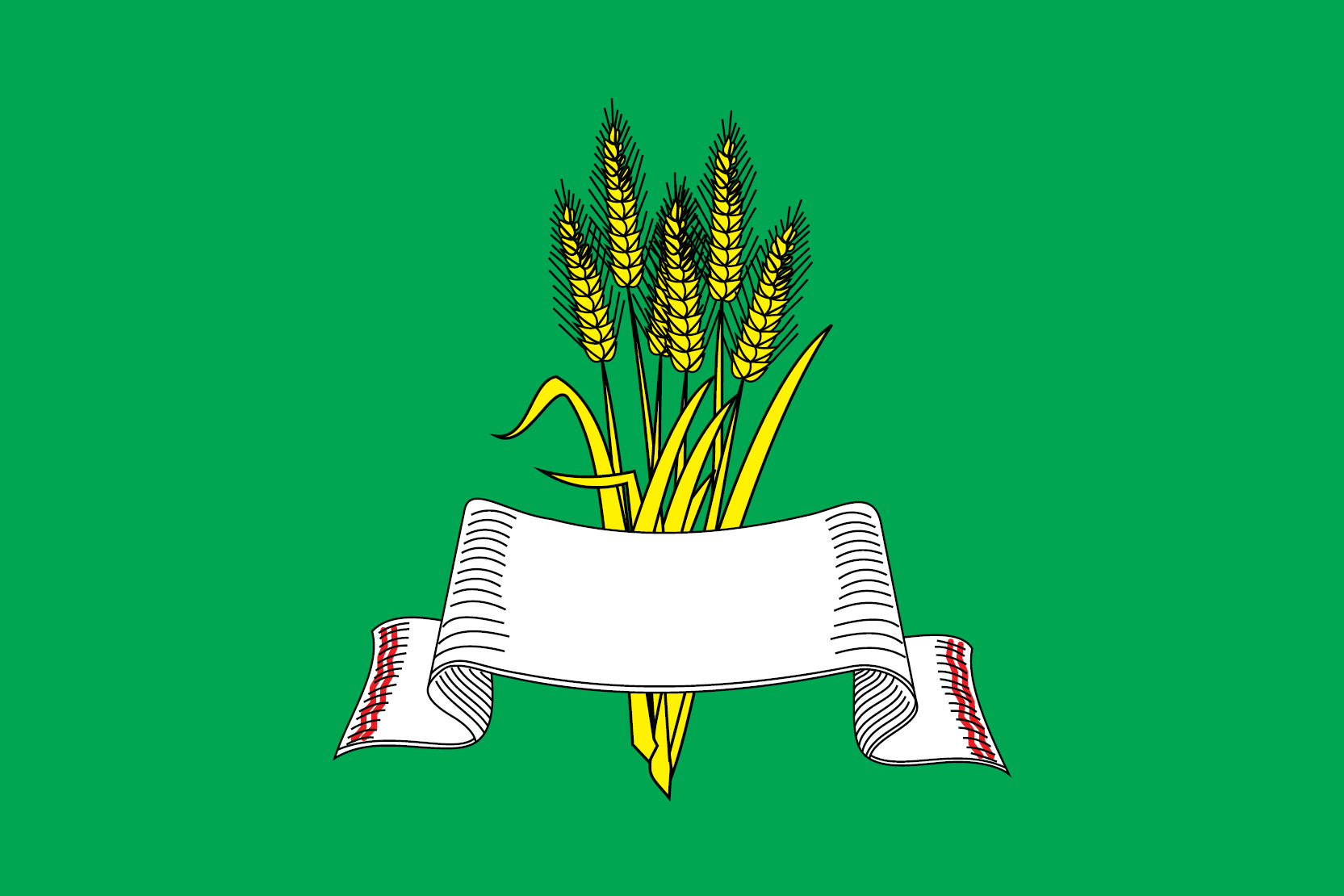
- Flag Coat of arms
- Location of Syamzhensky District in Vologda Oblast
- Coordinates: 60°01′N 41°03′E
- Country: Russia
- Federal subject: Vologda Oblast
- Established: January 25, 1935
- Administrative center: Syamzha

Area
  - Total: 3,900 km^{2} (1,500 sq mi)

Population (2010 Census)
  - Total: 8,745
  - Density: 2.2/km^{2} (5.8/sq mi)
  - Urban: 0%
  - Rural: 100%

Administrative structure
  - Administrative divisions: 10 selsoviet
  - Inhabited localities: 165 rural localities

Municipal structure
  - Municipally incorporated as: Syamzhensky Municipal District
  - Municipal divisions: 0 urban settlements, 8 rural settlements
- Time zone: UTC+3 (MSK)
- OKTMO ID: 19640000
- Website: http://syamzha-ar.vologda.ru/

Syamzhensky District (Russian: Ся́мженский райо́н) is an administrative and municipal district (raion), one of the twenty-six in Vologda Oblast, Russia. It is located in the center of the oblast and borders with Vozhegodsky District in the north, Verkhovazhsky District in the northeast, Totemsky District in the east, Sokolsky District in the south, and with Kharovsky District in the west. The area of the district is 3,900 square kilometers (1,500 sq mi). Its administrative center is the rural locality (a selo) of Syamzha. District's population: 8,745 (2010 Census); 10,384 (2002 Census); 12,204 (1989 Soviet census). The population of Syamzha accounts for 45.2% of the district's total population.

== Geography ==
Almost the entire area of the district belongs to the basin of the Kubena River. The Kubena crosses the northwestern part of the district, entering from the north and exiting to the west. A major tributary of the Kubena within the district is the Syamzhena. The southern part of the district belongs to the basin of the Syamzhena; in particular, the administrative center of the district, the selo of Syamzha, is located on the banks of the Syamzhena. The biggest lake of the district, Lake Shichengskoye, also drains into the Syamzhena. The central and northern parts of the district belong to the basins of other tributaries of the Kubena, such as the Verdenga and the Yakhrenga. The northeastern part of the district drains into the Vaga River, a major tributary of the Northern Dvina, and the Vaga crosses the district in the northerly direction. Finally, some minor areas in the south and southeast of the district belong to the basins of the Sukhona's tributaries, such as the Tsaryova and the Dvinitsa. The whole area of the district thus belongs to the basins of the Northern Dvina and the White Sea.

Considerable areas within the district are covered by coniferous forests. There are swamps, particularly in the south, east, and northeast of the district. The biggest swamp in the district, the Shichengskoye Swamp, is located around Lake Shichengskoye.

== History ==
The general area was populated by Finnic peoples and then colonized by the Novgorod Republic. In the upper course of the Syamzhena River, the remains of the 12th-century settlement—Chudin Val—have been preserved. After the fall of Novgorod, the area became a part of the Grand Duchy of Moscow. In the course of the administrative reform carried out in 1708 by Peter the Great, the area was included into Archangelgorod Governorate. In 1780, the governorate was abolished and transformed into Vologda Viceroyalty. The latter was abolished in 1796, and the part of it which included the current area of the district became Vologda Governorate. The territory of the modern district was shared between Kadnikovsky and Totemsky Uyezds.

In 1929, several governorates, including Vologda Governorate, were merged into Northern Krai. On July 15, 1929, the uyezds were abolished, and Syamzhensky District with the administrative center in the village of Yarygino was established and became a part of Vologda Okrug of Northern Krai. In 1930, the okrug was abolished, and the district was subordinated to the central administration of Northern Krai. On August 5, 1931, Syamzhensky District was abolished, and its area was divided between Kharovsky and Totemsky Districts. On January 25, 1935, the district was re-established. The district's administrative center was established in the village of Dyakovskaya. In 1936, the krai was transformed into Northern Oblast. In 1937, Northern Oblast was split into Arkhangelsk Oblast and Vologda Oblast. Syamzhensky District remained in Vologda Oblast ever since. In 1953, the administrative center of the district was moved to the selo of Syamzha. During the abortive administrative reforms of 1962-1965, the district was appended to Kharovsky District.

== Administrative and municipal divisions ==
Administratively, the district is divided into ten selsoviets. Municipally, the district is incorporated as Syamzhensky Municipal District and is divided into eight rural settlements. The municipal district includes all of the inhabited localities of the administrative district, as well as three rural localities (the settlements of 47 km, Druzhba, and Sogorki) from Kharovsky District.

== Economy ==
=== Industry ===
The economy of the district is dominated by timber industry, which produces 82% of all goods in the district.

=== Agriculture ===
In 2010, six large- and mid-scale farms operated in the district. The main specializations were cattle breeding and crops growing. The farms produced milk and meat, and crops were mainly used to feed the cattle.

=== Transportation ===
One of the principal highways in Russia, M8, which connects Moscow and Arkhangelsk, crosses the district from south to north, passing Syamzha. There are also local roads, with the bus traffic originating from Syamzha.

None of the rivers are navigable within the limits of the district.

== Culture and recreation ==
The district contains sixty-three objects classified as cultural and historical heritage of local significance. Most of these are wooden farms and churches built prior to 1917.

In 2006, the Syamzhensky District Museum was opened in Syamzha. It displays archaeological, ethnographic, and local interest collections.
