= Syamzha =

Syamzha Сямжа
- Selo
- Interactive map of Syamzha
- Location of Syamzha Syamzha (Vologda Oblast)
- Coordinates: 60°01′N 41°03′E
- Country: Russia
- Federal subject: Vologda Oblast
- Administrative district: Syamzhensky District
- Selsoviet: Syamzhensky Selsoviet
- Founded: 1935

Population (2010 Census)
  - Total: 3,950
  - Estimate (2021): 3,967 (+0.4%)

Administrative status
  - Capital of: Syamzhensky District, Syamzhensky Selsoviet

Municipal status
  - Municipal district: Syamzhensky Municipal District
  - Rural settlement: Syamzhenskoye Rural Settlement
  - Capital of: Syamzhensky Municipal District, Syamzhenskoye Rural Settlement
- Time zone: UTC+3 (MSK)
- Postal code: 162220
- OKTMO ID: 19640428101

Syamzha (Russian: Ся́мжа) is a rural locality (a selo) and the administrative center of Syamzhensky District of Vologda Oblast, Russia, located on both banks of the Syamzhena River, a tributary of the Kubena River. It also serves as the administrative center of Syamzhensky Selsoviet, one of the ten selsoviets into which the district is administratively divided. Municipally, it is the administrative center of Syamzhenskoye Rural Settlement. Population: 3,950 (2010 census); 3,932 (2002 census); 3,928 (1989 Soviet census).

The name of Syamzha originates from the Syamzhena River, which, in turn, originates from Finnic languages and means "moss water" or "water from the swamp".

== History ==
On July 15, 1929, Syamzhensky District with the center in the village of Yarygino was established and became a part of Vologda Okrug of Northern Krai. On August 5, 1931, the district was abolished, and on January 25, 1935 it was reestablished. The district center was established in the village of Dyakovskaya. In the same year, the selo of Syamzha was established by merging several villages at the crossing of the Syamzhena River by the highway connecting Vologda and Arkhangelsk. In 1953, the district center was transferred to Syamzha.

== Economy ==
=== Industry ===
The economy of Syamzha is dominated by timber industry, which produces 82% of all goods in the district. There is also a butter factory.

=== Transportation ===
One of the principal highways in Russia, M8, which connects Moscow and Arkhangelsk, crosses Syamzhensky district from the south to the north, passing through Syamzha. There are also local roads, with the bus traffic originating from Syamzha.

== Culture and recreation ==
In 2006, the Syamzhensky District Museum was opened in Syamzha. It displays archaeologic, ethnographic, and local interest collections.
