= Alferovo =

Alferovo Алферово
- Village
- Location within Vologda Oblast Location within Russia
- Coordinates: 60°02′N 46°09′E
- Country: Russia
- Region: Vologda Oblast
- District: Kichmengsko-Gorodetsky District
- Time zone: UTC+3:00

Alferovo (Russian: Алферово) is a rural locality (a village) in Kochmengkskoye Rural Settlement, Kichmengsko-Gorodetsky District, Vologda Oblast, Russia. The population was 97 as of 2002. There are 2 streets.

== Geography ==
Alferovo is located 24 km northeast of Kichmengsky Gorodok (the district's administrative centre) by road. Kurilovo is the nearest rural locality.
