= Titovshchina =

Titovshchina Титовщина
- Village
- Location within Vologda Oblast Location within Russia
- Coordinates: 59°57′N 46°39′E
- Country: Russia
- Region: Vologda Oblast
- District: Kichmengsko-Gorodetsky District
- Time zone: UTC+3:00

Titovshchina (Russian: Титовщина) is a rural locality (a village) in Yenangskoye Rural Settlement, Kichmengsko-Gorodetsky District, Vologda Oblast, Russia. The population was 83 as of 2002. There are 3 streets.

== Geography ==
Titovshchina is located 72 km southeast of Kichmengsky Gorodok (the district's administrative centre) by road. Stepurino is the nearest rural locality.
