= Smolyanka =

Smolyanka Смольянка
- Village
- Location within Vologda Oblast Location within Russia
- Coordinates: 59°47′N 45°52′E
- Country: Russia
- Region: Vologda Oblast
- District: Kichmengsko-Gorodetsky District
- Time zone: UTC+3:00

Smolyanka (Russian: Смольянка) is a rural locality (a village) in Kichmegnskoye Rural Settlement, Kichmengsko-Gorodetsky District, Vologda Oblast, Russia. The population was 60 as of 2002. There are 3 streets.

== Geography ==
Smolyanka is located 29 km south of Kichmengsky Gorodok (the district's administrative centre) by road. Yelovino is the nearest rural locality.
