= Poryadnevshchina =

Poryadnevshchina Порядневщина
- Village
- Location within Vologda Oblast Location within Russia
- Coordinates: 59°53′N 46°39′E
- Country: Russia
- Region: Vologda Oblast
- District: Kichmengsko-Gorodetsky District
- Time zone: UTC+3:00

Poryadnevshchina (Russian: Порядневщина) is a rural locality (a village) in Yenangskoye Rural Settlement, Kichmengsko-Gorodetsky District, Vologda Oblast, Russia. The population was 48 as of 2002.

== Geography ==
Poryadnevshchina is located 73 km southeast of Kichmengsky Gorodok (the district's administrative centre) by road. Stepurino is the nearest rural locality.
