= Okulovo, Kichmengsko-Gorodetsky District, Vologda Oblast =

Okulovo Окулово
- Village
- Location within Vologda Oblast Location within Russia
- Coordinates: 60°04′N 46°30′E
- Country: Russia
- Region: Vologda Oblast
- District: Kichmengsko-Gorodetsky District
- Time zone: UTC+3:00

Okulovo (Russian: Окулово) is a rural locality (a village) in Yenangskoye Rural Settlement, Kichmengsko-Gorodetsky District, Vologda Oblast, Russia. The population was 26 as of 2002.

== Geography ==
Okulovo is located 64 km northeast of Kichmengsky Gorodok (the district's administrative centre) by road. Olyatovo is the nearest rural locality.
