= Baksheyev Dor =

Baksheyev Dor Бакшеев Дор
- Village
- Location within Vologda Oblast Location within Russia
- Coordinates: 59°54′N 46°40′E
- Country: Russia
- Region: Vologda Oblast
- District: Kichmengsko-Gorodetsky District
- Time zone: UTC+3:00

Baksheyev Dor (Russian: Бакшеев Дор) is a rural locality (a village) in Yenangskoye Rural Settlement, Kichmengsko-Gorodetsky District, Vologda Oblast, Russia. The population was 32 as of 2002. There are 2 streets.

== Geography ==
Baksheyev Dor is located 70 km southeast of Kichmengsky Gorodok (the district's administrative centre) by road. Gar is the nearest rural locality.
