= Zamostovitsa =

Zamostovitsa Замостовица
- Village
- Location within Vologda Oblast Location within Russia
- Coordinates: 60°00′N 45°50′E
- Country: Russia
- Region: Vologda Oblast
- District: Kichmengsko-Gorodetsky District
- Time zone: UTC+3:00

Zamostovitsa (Russian: Замостовица) is a rural locality (a village) in Gorodetskoye Rural Settlement, Kichmengsko-Gorodetsky District, Vologda Oblast, Russia. The population was 3 as of 2002. There are 3 streets.

== Geography ==
Zamostovitsa is located 3 km northeast of Kichmengsky Gorodok (the district's administrative centre) by road. Baranovo is the nearest rural locality.
