= Maloye Pozharovo =

Maloye Pozharovo Малое Пожарово
- Village
- Location within Vologda Oblast Location within Russia
- Coordinates: 59°50′N 46°34′E
- Country: Russia
- Region: Vologda Oblast
- District: Kichmengsko-Gorodetsky District
- Time zone: UTC+3:00

Maloye Pozharovo (Russian: Малое Пожарово) is a rural locality (a village) in Yenangskoye Rural Settlement, Kichmengsko-Gorodetsky District, Vologda Oblast, Russia. The population was 36 as of 2002.

== Geography ==
Maloye Pozharovo is located 81 km southeast of Kichmengsky Gorodok (the district's administrative centre) by road. Mokrushino is the nearest rural locality.
