= Pelyaginets =

Pelyaginets Пелягинец
- Village
- Location within Vologda Oblast Location within Russia
- Coordinates: 59°44′N 45°29′E
- Country: Russia
- Region: Vologda Oblast
- District: Kichmengsko-Gorodetsky District
- Time zone: UTC+3:00

Pelyaginets (Russian: Пелягинец) is a rural locality (a village) in Kichmegnskoye Rural Settlement, Kichmengsko-Gorodetsky District, Vologda Oblast, Russia. The population was 14 as of 2002.

== Geography ==
Pelyaginets is located 43 km southwest of Kichmengsky Gorodok (the district's administrative centre) by road. Kudrino is the nearest rural locality.
