= Olenevo =

Olenevo Оленево
- Village
- Location within Vologda Oblast Location within Russia
- Coordinates: 59°59′N 46°15′E
- Country: Russia
- Region: Vologda Oblast
- District: Kichmengsko-Gorodetsky District
- Time zone: UTC+3:00

Olenevo (Russian: Оленево) is a rural locality (a village) in Yenangskoye Rural Settlement, Kichmengsko-Gorodetsky District, Vologda Oblast, Russia. The population was 19 as of 2002.

== Geography ==
Olenevo is located 42 km east of Kichmengsky Gorodok (the district's administrative centre) by road. Shiryayevo is the nearest rural locality.
