= Myslikovo =

Myslikovo Мысликово
- Village
- Location within Vologda Oblast Location within Russia
- Coordinates: 60°05′N 45°30′E
- Country: Russia
- Region: Vologda Oblast
- District: Kichmengsko-Gorodetsky District
- Time zone: UTC+3:00

Myslikovo (Russian: Мысликово) is a rural locality (a village) in Gorodetskoye Rural Settlement, Kichmengsko-Gorodetsky District, Vologda Oblast, Russia. The population was 1 as of 2002.

== Geography ==
Myslikovo is located 24 km northwest of Kichmengsky Gorodok (the district's administrative centre) by road. Kholka is the nearest rural locality.
