= Kalinino, Kichmengsko-Gorodetsky District, Vologda Oblast =

Kalinino Калинино
- Village
- Location within Vologda Oblast Location within Russia
- Coordinates: 60°02′N 46°33′E
- Country: Russia
- Region: Vologda Oblast
- District: Kichmengsko-Gorodetsky District
- Time zone: UTC+3:00

Kalinino (Russian: Калинино) is a rural locality (a village) in Yenangskoye Rural Settlement, Kichmengsko-Gorodetsky District, Vologda Oblast, Russia. The population was 26 as of 2002.

== Geography ==
Kalinino is located 67 kilometres (42 mi) northeast of Kichmengsky Gorodok (the district's administrative centre) by road. Prilukovo is the nearest rural locality.
