= Kichmenga =

Kichmenga Кичменьга
- Selo
- Location within Vologda Oblast Location within Russia
- Coordinates: 60°03′N 45°35′E
- Country: Russia
- Region: Vologda Oblast
- District: Kichmengsko-Gorodetsky District
- Time zone: UTC+3:00

Kichmenga (Russian: Кичменьга) is a rural locality (a selo) in Gorodetskoye Rural Settlement, Kichmengsko-Gorodetsky District, Vologda Oblast, Russia. The population was 250 as of 2002. There are 10 streets.

== Geography ==
Kichmenga is located 19 km northwest of Kichmengsky Gorodok (the district's administrative centre) by road. Byakovo is the nearest rural locality.
