= Zavachug =

Zavachug Завачуг
- Village
- Location within Vologda Oblast Location within Russia
- Coordinates: 60°02′N 46°11′E
- Country: Russia
- Region: Vologda Oblast
- District: Kichmengsko-Gorodetsky District
- Time zone: UTC+3:00

Zavachug (Russian: Завачуг) is a rural locality (a village) in Kichmengskoye Rural Settlement, Kichmengsko-Gorodetsky District, Vologda Oblast, Russia. The population was 16 as of 2002.

== Geography ==
Zavachug is located 26 km northeast of Kichmengsky Gorodok (the district's administrative centre) by road. Sushniki is the nearest rural locality.
