= Okinin Dor =

Okinin Dor Окинин Дор
- Village
- Location within Vologda Oblast Location within Russia
- Coordinates: 59°50′N 45°27′E
- Country: Russia
- Region: Vologda Oblast
- District: Kichmengsko-Gorodetsky District
- Time zone: UTC+3:00

Okinin Dor (Russian: Окинин Дор) is a rural locality (a village) in Kichmegnskoye Rural Settlement, Kichmengsko-Gorodetsky District, Vologda Oblast, Russia. The population was 15 as of 2002.

== Geography ==
Okinin Dor is located 106 km southwest of Kichmengsky Gorodok (the district's administrative centre) by road. Ust-Syamzhenets is the nearest rural locality.
