= Artemyevskaya, Kichmengsko-Gorodetsky District, Vologda Oblast =

Artemyevskaya Артемьевская
- Village
- Location within Vologda Oblast Location within Russia
- Coordinates: 60°08′N 45°19′E
- Country: Russia
- Region: Vologda Oblast
- District: Kichmengsko-Gorodetsky District
- Time zone: UTC+3:00

Artemyevskaya (Russian: Артемьевская) is a rural locality (a village) in Gorodetskoye Rural Settlement, Kichmengsko-Gorodetsky District, Vologda Oblast, Russia. The population was 11 as of 2002.

== Geography ==
Artemyevskaya is located 39 km northwest of Kichmengsky Gorodok (the district's administrative centre) by road. Rossoulinskaya is the nearest rural locality.
