= Lupachevo =

Lupachevo Лупачево
- Village
- Location within Vologda Oblast Location within Russia
- Coordinates: 60°01′N 46°21′E
- Country: Russia
- Region: Vologda Oblast
- District: Kichmengsko-Gorodetsky District
- Time zone: UTC+3:00

Lupachevo (Russian: Лупачево) is a rural locality (a village) in Yenangskoye Rural Settlement, Kichmengsko-Gorodetsky District, Vologda Oblast, Russia. The population was 4 as of 2002.

== Geography ==
Lupachevo is located 38 km northeast of Kichmengsky Gorodok (the district's administrative centre) by road. Pronino is the nearest rural locality.
