= Novo-Georgiyevskoye =

Novo-Georgiyevskoye Ново-Георгиевское
- Selo
- Location within Vologda Oblast Location within Russia
- Coordinates: 59°48′N 45°29′E
- Country: Russia
- Region: Vologda Oblast
- District: Kichmengsko-Gorodetsky District
- Time zone: UTC+3:00

Novo-Georgiyevskoye (Russian: Ново-Георгиевское) is a rural locality (a selo) in Kichmegnskoye Rural Settlement, Kichmengsko-Gorodetsky District, Vologda Oblast, Russia. The population was 10 as of 2002.

== Geography ==
Novo-Georgiyevskoye is located 32 km southwest of Kichmengsky Gorodok (the district's administrative centre) by road. Kurilovo is the nearest rural locality.
