= Polovishchensky =

Polovishchensky Половищенский
- Village
- Location within Vologda Oblast Location within Russia
- Coordinates: 60°13′N 46°04′E
- Country: Russia
- Region: Vologda Oblast
- District: Kichmengsko-Gorodetsky District
- Time zone: UTC+3:00

Polovishchensky (Russian: Половищенский) is a rural locality (a village) in Kichmegnskoye Rural Settlement, Kichmengsko-Gorodetsky District, Vologda Oblast, Russia. The population was 14 as of 2002.

== Geography ==
The distance to Kichmengsky Gorodok is 36 km. Laptyug is the nearest rural locality.
