= Maly Dor, Kichmengsko-Gorodetsky District, Vologda Oblast =

Maly Dor Малый Дор
- Village
- Location within Vologda Oblast Location within Russia
- Coordinates: 60°06′N 46°15′E
- Country: Russia
- Region: Vologda Oblast
- District: Kichmengsko-Gorodetsky District
- Time zone: UTC+3:00

Maly Dor (Russian: Малый Дор) is a rural locality (a village) in Kichmegnskoye Rural Settlement, Kichmengsko-Gorodetsky District, Vologda Oblast, Russia. The population was 3 as of 2002.

== Geography ==
Maly Dor is located 41 km northeast of Kichmengsky Gorodok (the district's administrative centre) by road. Shemyachkino is the nearest rural locality.
