= Ploskaya =

Ploskaya Плоская
- Village
- Location within Vologda Oblast Location within Russia
- Coordinates: 59°52′N 45°59′E
- Country: Russia
- Region: Vologda Oblast
- District: Kichmengsko-Gorodetsky District
- Time zone: UTC+3:00

Ploskaya (Russian: Плоская) is a rural locality (a village) in Kichmegnskoye Rural Settlement, Kichmengsko-Gorodetsky District, Vologda Oblast, Russia. The population was 367 as of 2002. There are 7 streets.

== Geography ==
Ploskaya is located 19 km southeast of Kichmengsky Gorodok (the district's administrative centre) by road. Koskovo is the nearest rural locality.
