= Podgorye (village), Vologda Oblast =

Podgorye Подгорье
- Selo
- Location within Vologda Oblast Location within Russia
- Coordinates: 59°59′N 46°37′E
- Country: Russia
- Region: Vologda Oblast
- District: Kichmengsko-Gorodetsky District
- Time zone: UTC+3:00

Podgorye (Russian: Подгорье) is a rural locality (a selo) in Yenangskoye Rural Settlement, Kichmengsko-Gorodetsky District, Vologda Oblast, Russia. The population was 3 as of 2002.

== Geography ==
Podgorye is located 71 km east of Kichmengsky Gorodok (the district's administrative centre) by road. Nizhneye Isakovo is the nearest rural locality.
