= Verkhny Yenangsk =

Verkhny Yenangsk Верхний Енангск
- Selo
- Location within Vologda Oblast Location within Russia
- Coordinates: 59°56′N 46°23′E
- Country: Russia
- Region: Vologda Oblast
- District: Kichmengsko-Gorodetsky District
- Time zone: UTC+3:00

Verkhny Yenangsk (Russian: Верхний Енангск) is a rural locality (a selo) in Kichmengskoye Rural Settlement, Kichmengsko-Gorodetsky District, Vologda Oblast, Russia. The population was 15 as of 2002.

== Geography ==
Verkhny Yenangsk is located 56 km southeast of Kichmengsky Gorodok (the district's administrative centre) by road. Mitino is the nearest rural locality.
