= Bolshaya Chiryadka =

Bolshaya Chiryadka Большая Чирядка
- Village
- Location within Vologda Oblast Location within Russia
- Coordinates: 59°49′N 45°36′E
- Country: Russia
- Region: Vologda Oblast
- District: Kichmengsko-Gorodetsky District
- Time zone: UTC+3:00

Bolshaya Chiryadka (Russian: Большая Чирядка) is a rural locality (a village) in Kichmengskoye Rural Settlement, Kichmengsko-Gorodetsky District, Vologda Oblast, Russia. The population was 43 as of 2002.

== Geography ==
Bolshaya Chiryadka is located 27 km southwest of Kichmengsky Gorodok (the district's administrative centre) by road. Malaya Chiryadka is the nearest rural locality.
