= Sergeyevo, Kichmengsko-Gorodetsky District, Vologda Oblast =

Sergeyevo Сергеево
- Village
- Location within Vologda Oblast Location within Russia
- Coordinates: 60°04′N 46°25′E
- Country: Russia
- Region: Vologda Oblast
- District: Kichmengsko-Gorodetsky District
- Time zone: UTC+3:00

Sergeyevo (Russian: Сергеево) is a rural locality (a village) in Kichmegnskoye Rural Settlement, Kichmengsko-Gorodetsky District, Vologda Oblast, Russia. The population was 32 as of 2002.

== Geography ==
Sergeyevo is located 39 km northeast of Kichmengsky Gorodok (the district's administrative centre) by road. Kontiyevo is the nearest rural locality.
