= Toropovo, Kichmengsko-Gorodetsky District, Vologda Oblast =

Toropovo Торопово
- Village
- Location within Vologda Oblast Location within Russia
- Coordinates: 59°59′N 45°46′E
- Country: Russia
- Region: Vologda Oblast
- District: Kichmengsko-Gorodetsky District
- Time zone: UTC+3:00

Toropovo (Russian: Торопово) is a rural locality (a village) in Gorodetskoye Rural Settlement, Kichmengsko-Gorodetsky District, Vologda Oblast, Russia. The population was 136 as of 2002. There are 4 streets.

== Geography ==
Toropovo is located 3 km northwest of Kichmengsky Gorodok (the district's administrative centre) by road. Reshetnikovo is the nearest rural locality.
