= Shartanovo =

Shartanovo Шартаново
- Village
- Location within Vologda Oblast Location within Russia
- Coordinates: 59°57′N 45°47′E
- Country: Russia
- Region: Vologda Oblast
- District: Kichmengsko-Gorodetsky District
- Time zone: UTC+3:00

Shartanovo (Russian: Шартаново) is a rural locality (a village) in Kichmegnskoye Rural Settlement, Kichmengsko-Gorodetsky District, Vologda Oblast, Russia. The population was 123 as of 2002. There are 3 streets.

== Geography ==
Shartanovo is located 8 km southwest of Kichmengsky Gorodok (the district's administrative centre) by road. Kichmengsky Gorodok is the nearest rural locality.
