= Plostiyevo =

Plostiyevo Плостиево
- Village
- Location within Vologda Oblast Location within Russia
- Coordinates: 59°46′N 45°28′E
- Country: Russia
- Region: Vologda Oblast
- District: Kichmengsko-Gorodetsky District
- Time zone: UTC+3:00

Plostiyevo (Russian: Плостиево) is a rural locality (a village) in Kichmegnskoye Rural Settlement, Kichmengsko-Gorodetsky District, Vologda Oblast, Russia. The population was 12 as of 2002.

== Geography ==
Plostiyevo is located 35 km southwest of Kichmengsky Gorodok (the district's administrative centre) by road. Demino is the nearest rural locality.
