= Zasorino =

Zasorino Засорино
- Village
- Location within Vologda Oblast Location within Russia
- Coordinates: 59°57′N 46°23′E
- Country: Russia
- Region: Vologda Oblast
- District: Kichmengsko-Gorodetsky District
- Time zone: UTC+3:00

Zasorino (Russian: Засорино) is a rural locality (a village) in Yenangskoye Rural Settlement, Kichmengsko-Gorodetsky District, Vologda Oblast, Russia. The population was 21 as of 2002.

== Geography ==
Zasorino is located 54 km east of Kichmengsky Gorodok (the district's administrative centre) by road. Aksenovshchina is the nearest rural locality.
