= Niva, Vologda Oblast =

Niva Нива
- Village
- Location within Vologda Oblast Location within Russia
- Coordinates: 59°57′N 45°55′E
- Country: Russia
- Region: Vologda Oblast
- District: Kichmengsko-Gorodetsky District
- Time zone: UTC+3:00

Niva (Russian: Нива) is a rural locality (a village) in Kichmegnskoye Rural Settlement, Kichmengsko-Gorodetsky District, Vologda Oblast, Russia. The population was 15 as of 2002.

== Geography ==
Niva is located 13 km southeast of Kichmengsky Gorodok (the district's administrative centre) by road. Chupovo is the nearest rural locality.
