= Goluzino =

Goluzino Голузино
- Village
- Location within Vologda Oblast Location within Russia
- Coordinates: 59°52′N 45°40′E
- Country: Russia
- Region: Vologda Oblast
- District: Kichmengsko-Gorodetsky District
- Time zone: UTC+3:00

Goluzino (Russian: Голузино) is a rural locality (a village) in Kichmegnskoye Rural Settlement, Kichmengsko-Gorodetsky District, Vologda Oblast, Russia. The population was 72 as of 2002.

== Geography ==
Goluzino is located 19 km southwest of Kichmengsky Gorodok (the district's administrative centre) by road. Gridenskaya is the nearest rural locality.
