= Konishchevo, Kichmengsko-Gorodetsky District, Vologda Oblast =

Konishchevo Конищево
- Village
- Location within Vologda Oblast Location within Russia
- Coordinates: 59°56′N 45°37′E
- Country: Russia
- Region: Vologda Oblast
- District: Kichmengsko-Gorodetsky District
- Time zone: UTC+3:00

Konishchevo (Russian: Конищево) is a rural locality (a village) in Gorodetskoye Rural Settlement, Kichmengsko-Gorodetsky District, Vologda Oblast, Russia. The population was 7 as of 2002.

== Geography ==
Konishchevo is located 14 km southwest of Kichmengsky Gorodok (the district's administrative centre) by road. Zagarye is the nearest rural locality.
