= Koryakovskaya =

Koryakovskaya Коряковская
- Village
- Location within Vologda Oblast Location within Russia
- Coordinates: 59°55′N 45°54′E
- Country: Russia
- Region: Vologda Oblast
- District: Kichmengsko-Gorodetsky District
- Time zone: UTC+3:00

Koryakovskaya (Russian: Коряковская) is a rural locality (a village) in Kichmegnskoye Rural Settlement, Kichmengsko-Gorodetsky District, Vologda Oblast, Russia. The population was 20 as of 2002. There are two streets.

== Geography ==
Koryakovskaya is located 11 km southeast of Kichmengsky Gorodok (the district's administrative centre) by road. Nizhneye Vorovo is the nearest rural locality.
