= Berezovaya Gora, Vologda Oblast =

Berezovaya Gora Березовая Гора
- Village
- Location within Vologda Oblast Location within Russia
- Coordinates: 59°53′N 45°43′E
- Country: Russia
- Region: Vologda Oblast
- District: Kichmengsko-Gorodetsky District
- Time zone: UTC+3:00

Berezovaya Gora (Russian: Березовая Гора) is a rural locality (a village) in Kichmengskoye Rural Settlement, Kichmengsko-Gorodetsky District, Vologda Oblast, Russia. The population was 162 as of 2002. There are 2 streets.

== Geography ==
Berezovaya Gora is located 15 km southwest of Kichmengsky Gorodok (the district's administrative centre) by road. Podol is the nearest rural locality.
