= Selishche, Kichmengsko-Gorodetsky District, Vologda Oblast =

Selishche Селище
- Village
- Location within Vologda Oblast Location within Russia
- Coordinates: 60°05′N 46°23′E
- Country: Russia
- Region: Vologda Oblast
- District: Kichmengsko-Gorodetsky District
- Time zone: UTC+3:00

Selishche (Russian: Селище) is a rural locality (a village) in Kichmegnskoye Rural Settlement, Kichmengsko-Gorodetsky District, Vologda Oblast, Russia. The population was 4 as of 2002.

== Geography ==
Selishche is located 38 km northeast of Kichmengsky Gorodok (the district's administrative centre) by road. Ryabinovshchina is the nearest rural locality.
