= Yefimovo, Kichmengsko-Gorodetsky District, Vologda Oblast =

Yefimovo Ефимово
- Village
- Location within Vologda Oblast Location within Russia
- Coordinates: 59°52′N 46°37′E
- Country: Russia
- Region: Vologda Oblast
- District: Kichmengsko-Gorodetsky District
- Time zone: UTC+3:00

Yefimovo (Russian: Ефимово) is a rural locality (a village) in Yenangskoye Rural Settlement, Kichmengsko-Gorodetsky District, Vologda Oblast, Russia. The population was 33 as of 2002.

== Geography ==
Yefimovo is located 76 km southeast of Kichmengsky Gorodok (the district's administrative centre) by road. Verkhnyaya Yentala is the nearest rural locality.
