= Krokhalevo, Vologda Oblast =

Krokhalevo Крохалево
- Village
- Location within Vologda Oblast Location within Russia
- Coordinates: 59°59′N 45°49′E
- Country: Russia
- Region: Vologda Oblast
- District: Kichmengsko-Gorodetsky District
- Time zone: UTC+3:00

Krokhalevo (Russian: Крохалево) is a rural locality (a village) in Gorodetskoye Rural Settlement, Kichmengsko-Gorodetsky District, Vologda Oblast, Russia. The population was 70 as of 2002.

== Geography ==
Krokhalevo is located 2 km east of Kichmengsky Gorodok (the district's administrative centre) by road. Kichmengsky Gorodok is the nearest rural locality.
