= Bryukhavitsa =

Bryukhavitsa Брюхавица
- Village
- Location within Vologda Oblast Location within Russia
- Coordinates: 59°55′N 45°40′E
- Country: Russia
- Region: Vologda Oblast
- District: Kichmengsko-Gorodetsky District
- Time zone: UTC+3:00

Bryukhavitsa (Russian: Брюхавица) is a rural locality (a village) in Gorodetskoye Rural Settlement, Kichmengsko-Gorodetsky District, Vologda Oblast, Russia. The population was 5 as of 2002.

== Geography ==
Bryukhavitsa is located 12 km southwest of Kichmengsky Gorodok (the district's administrative centre) by road. Shonga is the nearest rural locality.
