= Shiryayevo, Kichmengsko-Gorodetsky District, Vologda Oblast =

Shiryayevo Ширяево
- Village
- Location within Vologda Oblast Location within Russia
- Coordinates: 59°58′N 46°16′E
- Country: Russia
- Region: Vologda Oblast
- District: Kichmengsko-Gorodetsky District
- Time zone: UTC+3:00

Shiryayevo (Russian: Ширяево) is a rural locality (a village) in Yenangskoye Rural Settlement, Kichmengsko-Gorodetsky District, Vologda Oblast, Russia. The population was 69 as of 2002.

== Geography ==
Shiryayevo is located 43 km southeast of Kichmengsky Gorodok (the district's administrative centre) by road. Slobodka is the nearest rural locality.
