= Nizhneye Vorovo =

Nizhneye Vorovo Нижнее Ворово
- Village
- Location within Vologda Oblast Location within Russia
- Coordinates: 59°55′N 45°55′E
- Country: Russia
- Region: Vologda Oblast
- District: Kichmengsko-Gorodetsky District
- Time zone: UTC+3:00

Nizhneye Vorovo (Russian: Нижнее Ворово) is a rural locality (a village) in Kichmegnskoye Rural Settlement, Kichmengsko-Gorodetsky District, Vologda Oblast, Russia. The population was 48 as of 2002. There are 2 streets.

== Geography ==
Nizhneye Vorovo is located 12 km southeast of Kichmengsky Gorodok (the district's administrative centre) by road. Koryakovskaya is the nearest rural locality.
