= Sirino =

Sirino Сирино
- Village
- Location within Vologda Oblast Location within Russia
- Coordinates: 60°12′N 45°04′E
- Country: Russia
- Region: Vologda Oblast
- District: Kichmengsko-Gorodetsky District
- Time zone: UTC+3:00

Sirino (Russian: Сирино) is a rural locality (a village) in Gorodetskoye Rural Settlement, Kichmengsko-Gorodetsky District, Vologda Oblast, Russia. The population was 77 as of 2002. There are 2 streets.

== Geography ==
Sirino is located 57 km northwest of Kichmengsky Gorodok (the district's administrative centre) by road. Kryazh is the nearest rural locality.
