= Kuzminskaya, Kichmengsko-Gorodetsky District, Vologda Oblast =

Kuzminskaya Кузьминская
- Village
- Location within Vologda Oblast Location within Russia
- Coordinates: 59°58′N 46°13′E
- Country: Russia
- Region: Vologda Oblast
- District: Kichmengsko-Gorodetsky District
- Time zone: UTC+3:00

Kuzminskaya (Russian: Кузьминская) is a rural locality (a village) in Yenangskoye Rural Settlement, Kichmengsko-Gorodetsky District, Vologda Oblast, Russia. The population was 7 as of 2002.

== Geography ==
Kuzminskaya is located 40 km southeast of Kichmengsky Gorodok (the district's administrative centre) by road. Rybino is the nearest rural locality.
