= Zasosenye =

Zasosenye Засосенье
- Village
- Location within Vologda Oblast Location within Russia
- Coordinates: 60°02′N 45°53′E
- Country: Russia
- Region: Vologda Oblast
- District: Kichmengsko-Gorodetsky District
- Time zone: UTC+3:00

Zasosenye (Russian: Засосенье) is a rural locality (a village) in Kichmegnskoye Rural Settlement, Kichmengsko-Gorodetsky District, Vologda Oblast, Russia. The population was 10 as of 2002.

== Geography ==
Zasosenye is located 11 km northeast of Kichmengsky Gorodok (the district's administrative centre) by road. Zhukovo is the nearest rural locality.
