= Skoryukovo, Vologda Oblast =

Skoryukovo Скорюково
- Village
- Location within Vologda Oblast Location within Russia
- Coordinates: 59°52′N 46°36′E
- Country: Russia
- Region: Vologda Oblast
- District: Kichmengsko-Gorodetsky District
- Time zone: UTC+3:00

Skoryukovo (Russian: Скорюково) is a rural locality (a village) in Yenangskoye Rural Settlement, Kichmengsko-Gorodetsky District, Vologda Oblast, Russia. The population was 43 as of 2002.

== Geography ==
Skoryukovo is located 78 km southeast of Kichmengsky Gorodok (the district's administrative centre) by road. Kolotovshchina is the nearest rural locality.
