= Zayuzhye =

Zayuzhye Заюжье
- Village
- Location within Vologda Oblast Location within Russia
- Coordinates: 59°45′N 45°25′E
- Country: Russia
- Region: Vologda Oblast
- District: Kichmengsko-Gorodetsky District
- Time zone: UTC+3:00

Zayuzhye (Russian: Заюжье) is a rural locality (a village) in Kichmegnskoye Rural Settlement, Kichmengsko-Gorodetsky District, Vologda Oblast, Russia. The population was 12 as of 2002.

== Geography ==
Zayuzhye is located 41 km southwest of Kichmengsky Gorodok (the district's administrative centre) by road. Ivakovo is the nearest rural locality.
