= Vaganovo, Kichmengsko-Gorodetsky District, Vologda Oblast =

Vaganovo Ваганово
- Village
- Location within Vologda Oblast Location within Russia
- Coordinates: 60°03′N 45°39′E
- Country: Russia
- Region: Vologda Oblast
- District: Kichmengsko-Gorodetsky District
- Time zone: UTC+3:00

Vaganovo (Russian: Ваганово) is a rural locality (a village) in Kichmengskoye Rural Settlement, Kichmengsko-Gorodetsky District, Vologda Oblast, Russia. The population was 41 as of 2002.

== Geography ==
Vaganovo is located 12 km northwest of Kichmengsky Gorodok (the district's administrative centre) by road. Kirkino is the nearest rural locality.
