= Terekhino =

Terekhino Терехино
- Village
- Location within Vologda Oblast Location within Russia
- Coordinates: 60°00′N 46°25′E
- Country: Russia
- Region: Vologda Oblast
- District: Kichmengsko-Gorodetsky District
- Time zone: UTC+3:00

Terekhino (Russian: Терехино) is a rural locality (a village) in Yenangskoye Rural Settlement, Kichmengsko-Gorodetsky District, Vologda Oblast, Russia. The population was 11 as of 2002.

== Geography ==
Terekhino is located 52 km east of Kichmengsky Gorodok (the district's administrative centre) by road. Nizhny Yegansk is the nearest rural locality.
