= Leontyevshchina =

Leontyevshchina Леонтьевщина
- Village
- Location within Vologda Oblast Location within Russia
- Coordinates: 59°59′N 46°20′E
- Country: Russia
- Region: Vologda Oblast
- District: Kichmengsko-Gorodetsky District
- Time zone: UTC+3:00

Leontyevshchina (Russian: Леонтьевщина) is a rural locality (a village) in Yenangskoye Rural Settlement, Kichmengsko-Gorodetsky District, Vologda Oblast, Russia. The population was 31 as of 2002.

== Geography ==
Leontyevshchina is located 48 km east of Kichmengsky Gorodok (the district's administrative centre) by road. Rudnikovo is the nearest rural locality.
