= Yemelyanov Dor =

Yemelyanov Dor Емельянов Дор
- Village
- Location within Vologda Oblast Location within Russia
- Coordinates: 59°52′N 45°27′E
- Country: Russia
- Region: Vologda Oblast
- District: Kichmengsko-Gorodetsky District
- Time zone: UTC+3:00

Yemelyanov Dor (Russian: Емельянов Дор) is a rural locality (a village) in Gorodetskoye Rural Settlement, Kichmengsko-Gorodetsky District, Vologda Oblast, Russia. The population was 92 as of 2002.

== Geography ==
Yemelyanov Dor is located 29 km southwest of Kichmengsky Gorodok (the district's administrative centre) by road. Zabolotny is the nearest rural locality.
