= Maloye Ramenye, Kichmengsko-Gorodetsky District, Vologda Oblast =

Maloye Ramenye Малое Раменье
- Village
- Location within Vologda Oblast Location within Russia
- Coordinates: 59°55′N 46°38′E
- Country: Russia
- Region: Vologda Oblast
- District: Kichmengsko-Gorodetsky District
- Time zone: UTC+3:00

Maloye Ramenye (Russian: Малое Раменье) is a rural locality (a village) in Yenangskoye Rural Settlement, Kichmengsko-Gorodetsky District, Vologda Oblast, Russia. The population was 2 as of 2002.

== Geography ==
Maloye Ramenye is located 68 km southeast of Kichmengsky Gorodok (the district's administrative centre) by road. Bolshoye Ramenye is the nearest rural locality.
