= Sudnicheskaya Gora =

Sudnicheskaya Gora Судническая Гора
- Village
- Location within Vologda Oblast Location within Russia
- Coordinates: 60°03′N 45°44′E
- Country: Russia
- Region: Vologda Oblast
- District: Kichmengsko-Gorodetsky District
- Time zone: UTC+3:00

Sudnicheskaya Gora (Russian: Судническая Гора) is a rural locality (a village) in Kichmegnskoye Rural Settlement, Kichmengsko-Gorodetsky District, Vologda Oblast, Russia. The population was 67 in 2002.

== Geography ==
Sudnicheskaya Gora is located 8 kilometres (5.0 mi) northwest of Kichmengsky Gorodok (the district's administrative centre) by road. Nedubrovo is the nearest rural locality.
