= Bolshoye Lapino =

Bolshoye Lapino Большое Лапино
- Village
- Location within Vologda Oblast Location within Russia
- Coordinates: 60°00′N 46°26′E
- Country: Russia
- Region: Vologda Oblast
- District: Kichmengsko-Gorodetsky District
- Time zone: UTC+3:00

Bolshoye Lapino (Russian: Большое Лапино) is a rural locality (a village) in Yenangskoye Rural Settlement, Kichmengsko-Gorodetsky District, Vologda Oblast, Russia. The population was 4 as of 2002.

== Geography ==
Bolshoye Lapino is located 54 km northeast of Kichmengsky Gorodok (the district's administrative centre) by road. Maloye Lapino is the nearest rural locality.
