= Korkin Dor =

Korkin Dor Коркин Дор
- Village
- Location within Vologda Oblast Location within Russia
- Coordinates: 59°50′N 45°29′E
- Country: Russia
- Region: Vologda Oblast
- District: Kichmengsko-Gorodetsky District
- Time zone: UTC+3:00

Korkin Dor (Russian: Коркин Дор) is a rural locality (a village) in Gorodetskoye Rural Settlement, Kichmengsko-Gorodetsky District, Vologda Oblast, Russia. The population was 14 as of 2002.

== Geography ==
Korkin Dor is located 35 km southwest of Kichmengsky Gorodok (the district's administrative centre) by road. Dolmatovo is the nearest rural locality.
