= Kradikhino (settlement) =

Kradikhino Крадихино
- Settlement
- Location within Vologda Oblast Location within Russia
- Coordinates: 59°50′N 46°38′E
- Country: Russia
- Region: Vologda Oblast
- District: Kichmengsko-Gorodetsky District
- Time zone: UTC+3:00

Kradikhino (Russian: Крадихино) is a rural locality (a settlement) in Yenangskoye Rural Settlement, Kichmengsko-Gorodetsky District, Vologda Oblast, Russia. The population was 212 as of 2002. There are 6 streets.

== Geography ==
Kradikhino is located 79 km southeast of Kichmengsky Gorodok (the district's administrative centre) by road.
