= Vymol =

Vymol Вымол
- Village
- Location within Vologda Oblast Location within Russia
- Coordinates: 60°01′N 46°05′E
- Country: Russia
- Region: Vologda Oblast
- District: Kichmengsko-Gorodetsky District
- Time zone: UTC+3:00

Vymol (Russian: Вымол) is a rural locality (a village) in Kichmengskoye Rural Settlement, Kichmengsko-Gorodetsky District, Vologda Oblast, Russia. The population was 22 as of 2002.

== Geography ==
Vymol is located 21 km northeast of Kichmengsky Gorodok (the district's administrative centre) by road. Lychenitsa is the nearest rural locality.
