= Makarovo, Kichmengsko-Gorodetsky District, Vologda Oblast =

Makarovo Макарово
- Village
- Location within Vologda Oblast Location within Russia
- Coordinates: 60°01′N 45°47′E
- Country: Russia
- Region: Vologda Oblast
- District: Kichmengsko-Gorodetsky District
- Time zone: UTC+3:00

Makarovo (Russian: Макарово) is a rural locality (a village) in Kichmegnskoye Rural Settlement, Kichmengsko-Gorodetsky District, Vologda Oblast, Russia. The population was 54 as of 2002.

== Geography ==
Makarovo is located 7 km north of Kichmengsky Gorodok (the district's administrative centre) by road. Sorokino is the nearest rural locality.
