= Stepurino, Kichmengsko-Gorodetsky District, Vologda Oblast =

Stepurino Степурино
- Village
- Location within Vologda Oblast Location within Russia
- Coordinates: 59°53′N 46°40′E
- Country: Russia
- Region: Vologda Oblast
- District: Kichmengsko-Gorodetsky District
- Time zone: UTC+3:00

Stepurino (Russian: Степурино) is a rural locality (a village) in Yenangskoye Rural Settlement, Kichmengsko-Gorodetsky District, Vologda Oblast, Russia. The population was 8 as of 2002.

== Geography ==
Stepurino is located 73 km southeast of Kichmengsky Gorodok (the district's administrative centre) by road. Trubovshchina is the nearest rural locality.
