= Krasavino-2 =

Krasavino-2 Красавино-2
- Village
- Location within Vologda Oblast Location within Russia
- Coordinates: 60°02′N 45°44′E
- Country: Russia
- Region: Vologda Oblast
- District: Kichmengsko-Gorodetsky District
- Time zone: UTC+3:00

Krasavino-2 (Russian: Красавино-2) is a rural locality (a village) in Kichmegnskoye Rural Settlement, Kichmengsko-Gorodetsky District, Vologda Oblast, Russia. The population was 39 as of 2002.

== Geography ==
Krasavino-2 is located 6 km northwest of Kichmengsky Gorodok (the district's administrative centre) by road. Nedubrovo is the nearest rural locality.
