= Sementsev Dor =

Sementsev Dor Семенцев Дор
- Village
- Location within Vologda Oblast Location within Russia
- Coordinates: 59°50′N 46°33′E
- Country: Russia
- Region: Vologda Oblast
- District: Kichmengsko-Gorodetsky District
- Time zone: UTC+3:00

Sementsev Dor (Russian: Семенцев Дор) is a rural locality (a village) in Yenangskoye Rural Settlement, Kichmengsko-Gorodetsky District, Vologda Oblast, Russia. The population was 16 as of 2002.

== Geography ==
Sementsev Dor is located 83 km southeast of Kichmengsky Gorodok (the district's administrative centre) by road. Podlesovo is the nearest rural locality.
