= Kuftino =

Kuftino Куфтино
- Village
- Location within Vologda Oblast Location within Russia
- Coordinates: 60°03′N 45°34′E
- Country: Russia
- Region: Vologda Oblast
- District: Kichmengsko-Gorodetsky District
- Time zone: UTC+3:00

Kuftino (Russian: Куфтино) is a rural locality (a village) in Gorodetskoye Rural Settlement, Kichmengsko-Gorodetsky District, Vologda Oblast, Russia. The population was 33 as of 2002.

== Geography ==
Kuftino is located 19 km northwest of Kichmengsky Gorodok (the district's administrative centre) by road. Byakovo is the nearest rural locality.
