= Kradikhino =

Kradikhino Крадихино
- Village
- Location within Vologda Oblast Location within Russia
- Coordinates: 59°51′N 46°37′E
- Country: Russia
- Region: Vologda Oblast
- District: Kichmengsko-Gorodetsky District
- Time zone: UTC+3:00

Kradikhino (Russian: Крадихино) is a rural locality (a village) in Yenangskoye Rural Settlement, Kichmengsko-Gorodetsky District, Vologda Oblast, Russia. The population was 39 as of 2002.

== Geography ==
Kradikhino is located 78 km southeast of Kichmengsky Gorodok (the district's administrative centre) by road. Michino is the nearest rural locality.
