= Zharovikha =

Zharovikha Жаровиха
- Village
- Location within Vologda Oblast Location within Russia
- Coordinates: 59°51′N 45°51′E
- Country: Russia
- Region: Vologda Oblast
- District: Kichmengsko-Gorodetsky District
- Time zone: UTC+3:00

Zharovikha (Russian: Жаровиха) is a rural locality (a village) in Kichmengskoye Rural Settlement, Kichmengsko-Gorodetsky District, Vologda Oblast, Russia. The population was 22 as of 2002.

== Geography ==
Zharovikha is located 19 km south of Kichmengsky Gorodok (the district's administrative centre) by road. Malinovitsa is the nearest rural locality.
