= Shelomets =

Shelomets Шеломец
- Village
- Location within Vologda Oblast Location within Russia
- Coordinates: 59°57′N 46°15′E
- Country: Russia
- Region: Vologda Oblast
- District: Kichmengsko-Gorodetsky District

Area
  - Total: 0.113 km^{2} (0.044 sq mi)

Population (2002)
  - Total: 11
  - Density: 97/km^{2} (250/sq mi)
- Time zone: UTC+3:00

Shelomets (Russian: Шеломец) is a rural locality (a village) in Yenangskoye Rural Settlement, Kichmengsko-Gorodetsky District, Vologda Oblast, Russia. The population was 11 as of 2002.

== Geography ==
Shelomets is located 43 km southeast of Kichmengsky Gorodok (the district's administrative centre) by road. Bolshoye Sirino is the nearest rural locality.
