= Podgorodye, Vologda Oblast =

Podgorodye Подгородье
- Selo
- Location within Vologda Oblast Location within Russia
- Coordinates: 60°04′N 46°29′E
- Country: Russia
- Region: Vologda Oblast
- District: Kichmengsko-Gorodetsky District
- Time zone: UTC+3:00

Podgorodye (Russian: Подгородье) is a rural locality (a selo) in Yenangskoye Rural Settlement, Kichmengsko-Gorodetsky District, Vologda Oblast, Russia. The population was 1 as of 2002.

== Geography ==
Podgorodye is located 60 km northeast of Kichmengsky Gorodok (the district's administrative centre) by road. Fedyuninskaya is the nearest rural locality.
