= Zhevnino =

Zhevnino Жевнино
- Village
- Location within Vologda Oblast Location within Russia
- Coordinates: 60°04′N 45°33′E
- Country: Russia
- Region: Vologda Oblast
- District: Kichmengsko-Gorodetsky District
- Time zone: UTC+3:00

Zhevnino (Russian: Жевнино) is a rural locality (a village) in Gorodetskoye Rural Settlement, Kichmengsko-Gorodetsky District, Vologda Oblast, Russia. The population was 4 as of 2002.

== Geography ==
Zhevnino is located 22 km northwest of Kichmengsky Gorodok (the district's administrative centre) by road. Grigorovo is the nearest rural locality.
