= Verkhnyaya Lukina Gora =

Verkhnyaya Lukina Gora Верхняя Лукина Гора
- Village
- Location within Vologda Oblast Location within Russia
- Coordinates: 60°01′N 45°37′E
- Country: Russia
- Region: Vologda Oblast
- District: Kichmengsko-Gorodetsky District
- Time zone: UTC+3:00

Verkhnyaya Lukina Gora (Russian: Верхняя Лукина Гора) is a rural locality (a village) in Gorodetskoye Rural Settlement, Kichmengsko-Gorodetsky District, Vologda Oblast, Russia. The population was 17 as of 2002.

== Geography ==
Verkhnyaya Lukina Gora is located 23 km northwest of Kichmengsky Gorodok (the district's administrative centre) by road. Nizhnyaya Lukina Gora is the nearest rural locality.
