= Maloye Barakovo =

Maloye Barakovo Малое Бараково
- Village
- Location within Vologda Oblast Location within Russia
- Coordinates: 59°54′N 45°56′E
- Country: Russia
- Region: Vologda Oblast
- District: Kichmengsko-Gorodetsky District
- Time zone: UTC+3:00

Maloye Barakovo (Russian: Малое Бараково) is a rural locality (a village) in Kichmegnskoye Rural Settlement, Kichmengsko-Gorodetsky District, Vologda Oblast, Russia. The population was 8 as of 2002.

== Geography ==
Maloye Barakovo is located 14 km southeast of Kichmengsky Gorodok (the district's administrative centre) by road. Bolshoye Burtanovo is the nearest rural locality.
