= Sushniki =

Sushniki Сушники
- Village
- Location within Vologda Oblast Location within Russia
- Coordinates: 60°02′N 46°12′E
- Country: Russia
- Region: Vologda Oblast
- District: Kichmengsko-Gorodetsky District
- Time zone: UTC+3:00

Sushniki (Russian: Сушники) is a rural locality (a village) in Kichmegnskoye Rural Settlement, Kichmengsko-Gorodetsky District, Vologda Oblast, Russia. The population was 9 as of 2002.

== Geography ==
Sushniki is located 27 km northeast of Kichmengsky Gorodok (the district's administrative centre) by road. Zavachug is the nearest rural locality.
