= Reshetnikovo, Kichmengsko-Gorodetsky District, Vologda Oblast =

Reshetnikovo Решетниково
- Village
- Location within Vologda Oblast Location within Russia
- Coordinates: 59°55′N 45°37′E
- Country: Russia
- Region: Vologda Oblast
- District: Kichmengsko-Gorodetsky District
- Time zone: UTC+3:00

Reshetnikovo (Russian: Решетниково) is a rural locality (a village) in Gorodetskoye Rural Settlement, Kichmengsko-Gorodetsky District, Vologda Oblast, Russia. The population was 119 as of 2002. There are 4 streets.

== Geography ==
Reshetnikovo is located 3 km northwest of Kichmengsky Gorodok (the district's administrative centre) by road. Toropovo is the nearest rural locality.
