= Verkhnyaya Yentala =

Verkhnyaya Yentala Верхняя Ентала
- Selo
- Location within Vologda Oblast Location within Russia
- Coordinates: 59°52′N 46°38′E
- Country: Russia
- Region: Vologda Oblast
- District: Kichmengsko-Gorodetsky District
- Time zone: UTC+3:00

Verkhnyaya Yentala (Russian: Верхняя Ентала) is a rural locality (a selo) in Yenangskoye Rural Settlement, Kichmengsko-Gorodetsky District, Vologda Oblast, Russia. The population was 197 as of 2002. There are 6 streets.

== Geography ==
Verkhnyaya Yentala is located 75 km southeast of Kichmengsky Gorodok (the district's administrative centre) by road. Vasino is the nearest rural locality.
