= Yugsky =

Yugsky Югский
- Settlement
- Location within Vologda Oblast Location within Russia
- Coordinates: 59°57′N 45°57′E
- Country: Russia
- Region: Vologda Oblast
- District: Kichmengsko-Gorodetsky District
- Time zone: UTC+3:00

Yugsky (Russian: Югский) is a rural locality (a settlement) in Kichmegnskoye Rural Settlement, Kichmengsko-Gorodetsky District, Vologda Oblast, Russia. The population was 1,076 as of 2002. There are 12 streets.

== Geography ==
Yugsky is located 18 km southeast of Kichmengsky Gorodok (the district's administrative centre) by road. Niva is the nearest rural locality.
