= Sivtsevo, Vologda Oblast =

Sivtsevo Сивцево
- Village
- Location within Vologda Oblast Location within Russia
- Coordinates: 60°11′N 45°13′E
- Country: Russia
- Region: Vologda Oblast
- District: Kichmengsko-Gorodetsky District
- Time zone: UTC+3:00

Sivtsevo (Russian: Сивцево) is a rural locality (a village) in Gorodetskoye Rural Settlement, Kichmengsko-Gorodetsky District, Vologda Oblast, Russia. The population was 9 as of 2002.

== Geography ==
Sivtsevo is located 52 km northwest of Kichmengsky Gorodok (the district's administrative centre) by road. Brod is the nearest rural locality.
