= Priluk, Kichmengsko-Gorodetsky District, Vologda Oblast =

Priluk Прилук
- Village
- Location within Vologda Oblast Location within Russia
- Coordinates: 60°08′N 45°18′E
- Country: Russia
- Region: Vologda Oblast
- District: Kichmengsko-Gorodetsky District
- Time zone: UTC+3:00

Priluk (Russian: Прилук) is a rural locality (a village) in Gorodetskoye Rural Settlement, Kichmengsko-Gorodetsky District, Vologda Oblast, Russia. The population was 73 as of 2002.

== Geography ==
Priluk is located 43 km northwest of Kichmengsky Gorodok (the district's administrative centre) by road. Sarayevo is the nearest rural locality.
