= Nizhneye Nikitino =

Nizhneye Nikitino Нижнее Никитино
- Village
- Location within Vologda Oblast Location within Russia
- Coordinates: 60°01′N 46°36′E
- Country: Russia
- Region: Vologda Oblast
- District: Kichmengsko-Gorodetsky District
- Time zone: UTC+3:00

Nizhneye Nikitino (Russian: Нижнее Никитино) is a rural locality (a village) in Yenangskoye Rural Settlement, Kichmengsko-Gorodetsky District, Vologda Oblast, Russia. The population was 4 as of 2002.

== Geography ==
Nizhneye Nikitino is located 71 km east of Kichmengsky Gorodok (the district's administrative centre) by road. Nizhneye Isakovo is the nearest rural locality.
