= Akimovo =

Akimovo Акимово
- Village
- Location within Vologda Oblast Location within Russia
- Coordinates: 59°59′N 46°04′E
- Country: Russia
- Region: Vologda Oblast
- District: Kichmengsko-Gorodetsky District
- Time zone: UTC+3:00

Akimovo (Russian: Акимово) is a rural locality (or village) in Kichmengskoye Rural Settlement, Kichmengsko-Gorodetsky District, Vologda Oblast, Russia. The population was 2 as of 2002.

== Geography ==
Akimovo is located 28 km (17 mi) east of Kichmengsky Gorodok (the district's administrative centre) by road. Spitsyno is the nearest rural locality.
