= Baklanikha, Kichmengsko-Gorodetsky District, Vologda Oblast =

Baklanikha Бакланиха
- Village
- Location within Vologda Oblast Location within Russia
- Coordinates: 60°01′N 46°33′E
- Country: Russia
- Region: Vologda Oblast
- District: Kichmengsko-Gorodetsky District
- Time zone: UTC+3:00

Baklanikha (Russian: Бакланиха) is a rural locality (a village) in Yenangskoye Rural Settlement, Kichmengsko-Gorodetsky District, Vologda Oblast, Russia. The population was 2 as of 2002.

== Geography ==
The distance to Kichmengsky Gorodok is 70 km, to Nizhny Yenansk is 18 km. Vypolzovo is the nearest rural locality.
