= Gromozovo =

Gromozovo Громозово
- Village
- Location within Vologda Oblast Location within Russia
- Coordinates: 59°58′N 46°03′E
- Country: Russia
- Region: Vologda Oblast
- District: Kichmengsko-Gorodetsky District
- Time zone: UTC+3:00

Gromozovo (Russian: Громозово) is a rural locality (a village) in Kichmengskoye Rural Settlement, Kichmengsko-Gorodetsky District, Vologda Oblast, Russia. The population was 8 as of 2002.

== Geography ==
Gromozovo is located 25 km southeast of Kichmengsky Gorodok (the district's administrative centre) by road. Spitsyno is the nearest rural locality.
