= Danilovo, Kichmengsko-Gorodetsky District, Vologda Oblast =

Danilovo Данилово
- Village
- Location within Vologda Oblast Location within Russia
- Coordinates: 60°01′N 45°58′E
- Country: Russia
- Region: Vologda Oblast
- District: Kichmengsko-Gorodetsky District
- Time zone: UTC+3:00

Danilovo (Russian: Данилово) is a rural locality (a village) in Kichmengskoye Rural Settlement, Kichmengsko-Gorodetsky District, Vologda Oblast, Russia. The population was 54 as of 2002.

== Geography ==
Danilovo is located 11 km northeast of Kichmengsky Gorodok (the district's administrative centre) by road. Dorozhkovo is the nearest rural locality.
