= Bolshoye Lubozino =

Bolshoye Lubozino Большое Лубозино
- Village
- Location within Vologda Oblast Location within Russia
- Coordinates: 59°49′N 45°31′E
- Country: Russia
- Region: Vologda Oblast
- District: Kichmengsko-Gorodetsky District
- Time zone: UTC+3:00

Bolshoye Lubozino (Russian: Большое Лубозино) is a rural locality (a village) in Kichmengskoye Rural Settlement, Kichmengsko-Gorodetsky District, Vologda Oblast, Russia. The population was 55 as of 2002.

== Geography ==
Bolshoye Lubozino is located 31 km southwest of Kichmengsky Gorodok (the district's administrative centre) by road. Mikheyevo is the nearest rural locality.
