= Garazhi =

Garazhi Гаражи
- Settlement
- Location within Vologda Oblast Location within Russia
- Coordinates: 60°06′N 45°29′E
- Country: Russia
- Region: Vologda Oblast
- District: Kichmengsko-Gorodetsky District
- Time zone: UTC+3:00

Garazhi (Russian: Гаражи) is a rural locality (a settlement) in Gorodetskoye Rural Settlement, Kichmengsko-Gorodetsky District, Vologda Oblast, Russia. The population was 249 as of 2002. There are five streets.

== Geography ==
Garazhi is located 25 km northwest of Kichmengsky Gorodok (the district's administrative centre) by road. Kholka is the nearest rural locality.
