= Bolshoye Khavino =

Bolshoye Khavino Большое Хавино
- Village
- Location within Vologda Oblast Location within Russia
- Coordinates: 59°55′N 45°28′E
- Country: Russia
- Region: Vologda Oblast
- District: Kichmengsko-Gorodetsky District
- Time zone: UTC+3:00

Bolshoye Khavino (Russian: Большое Хавино) is a rural locality (a village) in Gorodetskoye Rural Settlement, Kichmengsko-Gorodetsky District, Vologda Oblast, Russia. The population was 37 as of 2002.

== Geography ==
Bolshoye Khavino is located 22 km southwest of Kichmengsky Gorodok (the district's administrative centre) by road. Shatenevo is the nearest rural locality.
