= Nizhnyaya Yentala =

Nizhnyaya Yentala Нижняя Ентала
- Selo
- Location within Vologda Oblast Location within Russia
- Coordinates: 59°58′N 46°38′E
- Country: Russia
- Region: Vologda Oblast
- District: Kichmengsko-Gorodetsky District
- Time zone: UTC+3:00

Nizhnyaya Yentala (Russian: Нижняя Ентала) is a rural locality (a selo) in Yenangskoye Rural Settlement, Kichmengsko-Gorodetsky District, Vologda Oblast, Russia. The population was 33 as of 2002. There are 3 streets.

== Geography ==
Nizhnyaya Yentala is located 67 km east of Kichmengsky Gorodok (the district's administrative centre) by road. Alexeyevo is the nearest rural locality.
