= Aksyonovshchina =

Aksyonovshchina Аксёновщина
- Village
- Location within Vologda Oblast Location within Russia
- Coordinates: 59°57′04″N 46°24′11″E
- Country: Russia
- Region: Vologda Oblast
- District: Kichmengsko-Gorodetsky District
- Time zone: UTC+3:00

Aksyonovshchina (Russian: Аксёновщина) is a rural locality (a village) in Yenangskoye Rural Settlement, Kichmengsko-Gorodetsky District, Vologda Oblast, Russia. The population was 11 as of 2002.

== Geography ==
Aksyonovshchina is located 55 km (34 mi) east of Kichmengsky Gorodok (the district's administrative centre) by road. Zasorino is the nearest rural locality.
