= Svetitsa =

Svetitsa Светица
- Selo
- Location within Vologda Oblast Location within Russia
- Coordinates: 60°12′N 45°03′E
- Country: Russia
- Region: Vologda Oblast
- District: Kichmengsko-Gorodetsky District
- Time zone: UTC+3:00

Svetitsa (Russian: Светица) is a rural locality (a selo) in Gorodetskoye Rural Settlement, Kichmengsko-Gorodetsky District, Vologda Oblast, Russia. The population was 44 as of 2002.

== Geography ==
Svetitsa is located 58 km northwest of Kichmengsky Gorodok (the district's administrative centre) by road. Sirino is the nearest rural locality.
