= Yelovino =

Yelovino Еловино
- Village
- Location within Vologda Oblast Location within Russia
- Coordinates: 59°48′N 45°49′E
- Country: Russia
- Region: Vologda Oblast
- District: Kichmengsko-Gorodetsky District
- Time zone: UTC+3:00

Yelovino (Russian: Еловино) is a rural locality (a village) in Kichmengskoye Rural Settlement, Kichmengsko-Gorodetsky District, Vologda Oblast, Russia. The population was 293 as of 2002. There are 8 streets.

== Geography ==
Yelovino is located 25 km south of Kichmengsky Gorodok (the district's administrative centre) by road. Smolyanka is the nearest rural locality.
