= Yakshinskaya, Kichmengsko-Gorodetsky District, Vologda Oblast =

Yakshinskaya Якшинская
- Village
- Location within Vologda Oblast Location within Russia
- Coordinates: 60°07′N 45°17′E
- Country: Russia
- Region: Vologda Oblast
- District: Kichmengsko-Gorodetsky District
- Time zone: UTC+3:00

Yakshinskaya (Russian: Якшинская) is a rural locality (a village) in Gorodetskoye Rural Settlement, Kichmengsko-Gorodetsky District, Vologda Oblast, Russia. The population was 62 as of 2002. There are 2 streets.

== Geography ==
Yakshinskaya is located 39 km northwest of Kichmengsky Gorodok (the district's administrative centre) by road. Privolnaya is the nearest rural locality.
