= Chupovo =

Chupovo Чупово
- Village
- Location within Vologda Oblast Location within Russia
- Coordinates: 59°58′N 45°55′E
- Country: Russia
- Region: Vologda Oblast
- District: Kichmengsko-Gorodetsky District
- Time zone: UTC+3:00

Chupovo (Russian: Чупово) is a rural locality (a village) in Kichmegnskoye Rural Settlement, Kichmengsko-Gorodetsky District, Vologda Oblast, Russia. The population was 25 as of 2002.

== Geography ==
Chupovo is located 12 km southeast of Kichmengsky Gorodok (the district's administrative centre) by road. Chupovo is the nearest rural locality.
