= Verkhnesavinskaya =

Verkhnesavinskaya Верхнесавинская
- Village
- Location within Vologda Oblast Location within Russia
- Coordinates: 60°04′N 45°22′E
- Country: Russia
- Region: Vologda Oblast
- District: Kichmengsko-Gorodetsky District
- Time zone: UTC+3:00

Verkhnesavinskaya (Russian: Верхнесавинская) is a rural locality (a village) in Gorodetskoye Rural Settlement, Kichmengsko-Gorodetsky District, Vologda Oblast, Russia. The population was 40 as of 2002. There are 4 streets.

== Geography ==
Verkhnesavinskaya is located 37 km northwest of Kichmengsky Gorodok (the district's administrative centre) by road. Petryanino is the nearest rural locality.
