= Sarayevo, Kichmengsko-Gorodetsky District, Vologda Oblast =

Sarayevo Сараево
- Selo
- Location within Vologda Oblast Location within Russia
- Coordinates: 60°08′N 45°17′E
- Country: Russia
- Region: Vologda Oblast
- District: Kichmengsko-Gorodetsky District
- Time zone: UTC+3:00

Sarayevo (Russian: Сараево) is a rural locality (a selo) in Gorodetskoye Rural Settlement, Kichmengsko-Gorodetsky District, Vologda Oblast, Russia. The population was 82 as of 2002. There are 4 streets.

== Geography ==
Sarayevo is located 42 km northwest of Kichmengsky Gorodok (the district's administrative centre) by road. Ovsyannikovo is the nearest rural locality.
