= Zabolotny, Vologda Oblast =

Zabolotny Заболотный
- Settlement
- Location within Vologda Oblast Location within Russia
- Coordinates: 59°53′N 45°28′E
- Country: Russia
- Region: Vologda Oblast
- District: Kichmengsko-Gorodetsky District
- Time zone: UTC+3:00

Zabolotny (Russian: Заболотный) is a rural locality (a settlement) in Gorodetskoye Rural Settlement, Kichmengsko-Gorodetsky District, Vologda Oblast, Russia. The population was 12 as of 2002.

== Geography ==
The distance to Kichmengsky Gorodok is 27 km. Yemelyanov Dor is the nearest rural locality.
