= Nekipelovo =

Nekipelovo Некипелово
- Village
- Location within Vologda Oblast Location within Russia
- Coordinates: 60°02′N 45°39′E
- Country: Russia
- Region: Vologda Oblast
- District: Kichmengsko-Gorodetsky District
- Time zone: UTC+3:00

Nekipelovo (Russian: Некипелово) is a rural locality (a village) in Gorodetskoye Rural Settlement, Kichmengsko-Gorodetsky District, Vologda Oblast, Russia. The population was 29 as of 2002.

== Geography ==
Nekipelovo is located 21 km northwest of Kichmengsky Gorodok (the district's administrative centre) by road. Vaganovo is the nearest rural locality.
