= Tatarinovo, Kichmengsko-Gorodetsky District, Vologda Oblast =

Tatarinovo Татариново
- Village
- Location within Vologda Oblast Location within Russia
- Coordinates: 59°54′56″N 46°41′57″E
- Country: Russia
- Region: Vologda Oblast
- District: Kichmengsko-Gorodetsky District
- Time zone: UTC+3:00

Tatarinovo (Russian: Татариново) is a rural locality (a village) in Yenangskoye Rural Settlement, Kichmengsko-Gorodetsky District, Vologda Oblast, Russia. The population was 32 as of 2002. There are 2 streets.

== Geography ==
Tatarinovo is located 70 km (43 mi) southeast of Kichmengsky Gorodok (the district's administrative centre) by road. Kostylevo is the nearest rural locality.
