= Bolshoye Barakovo =

Bolshoye Barakovo Большое Бараково
- Village
- Location within Vologda Oblast Location within Russia
- Coordinates: 59°52′N 45°55′E
- Country: Russia
- Region: Vologda Oblast
- District: Kichmengsko-Gorodetsky District
- Time zone: UTC+3:00

Bolshoye Barakovo (Russian: Большое Бараково) is a rural locality (a village) in Kichmengskoye Rural Settlement, Kichmengsko-Gorodetsky District, Vologda Oblast, Russia. The population was 48 as of 2002. There are 2 streets.

== Geography ==
Bolshoye Barakovo is located 23 km southeast of Kichmengsky Gorodok (the district's administrative centre) by road. Malinovitsa is the nearest rural locality.
