= Zvezda, Vologda Oblast =

Zvezda Звезда
- Village
- Location within Vologda Oblast Location within Russia
- Coordinates: 59°50′N 45°36′E
- Country: Russia
- Region: Vologda Oblast
- District: Kichmengsko-Gorodetsky District
- Time zone: UTC+3:00

Zvezda (Russian: Звезда) is a rural locality (a village) in Kichmegnskoye Rural Settlement, Kichmengsko-Gorodetsky District, Vologda Oblast, Russia. The population was 8 as of 2002.

== Geography ==
Zvezda is located 23 km southwest of Kichmengsky Gorodok (the district's administrative centre) by road. Bolshaya Chiryadka is the nearest rural locality.
