= Nizhneye Isakovo =

Nizhneye Isakovo Нижнее Исаково
- Village
- Location within Vologda Oblast Location within Russia
- Coordinates: 60°00′N 46°37′E
- Country: Russia
- Region: Vologda Oblast
- District: Kichmengsko-Gorodetsky District
- Time zone: UTC+3:00

Nizhneye Isakovo (Russian: Нижнее Исаково) is a rural locality (a village) in Yenangskoye Rural Settlement, Kichmengsko-Gorodetsky District, Vologda Oblast, Russia. The population was 26 as of 2002.

== Geography ==
Nizhneye Isakovo is located 71 km east of Kichmengsky Gorodok (the district's administrative centre) by road. Nizhneye Nikitino is the nearest rural locality.
