= Obakino =

Obakino Обакино
- Village
- Location within Vologda Oblast Location within Russia
- Coordinates: 60°12′N 45°02′E
- Country: Russia
- Region: Vologda Oblast
- District: Kichmengsko-Gorodetsky District
- Time zone: UTC+3:00

Obakino (Russian: Обакино) is a rural locality (a village) in Gorodetskoye Rural Settlement, Kichmengsko-Gorodetsky District, Vologda Oblast, Russia. The population was 49 as of 2002.

== Geography ==
Obakino is located 59 km northwest of Kichmengsky Gorodok (the district's administrative centre) by road. Gora is the nearest rural locality.
