= Ust-Syamzhenets =

Ust-Syamzhenets Усть-Сямженец
- Village
- Location within Vologda Oblast Location within Russia
- Coordinates: 59°49′N 45°27′E
- Country: Russia
- Region: Vologda Oblast
- District: Kichmengsko-Gorodetsky District
- Time zone: UTC+3:00

Ust-Syamzhenets (Russian: Усть-Сямженец) is a rural locality (a village) in Kichmegnskoye Rural Settlement, Kichmengsko-Gorodetsky District, Vologda Oblast, Russia. The population was 38 as of 2002.

== Geography ==
Ust-Syamzhenets is located 108 km southwest of Kichmengsky Gorodok (the district's administrative centre) by road. Vysokaya is the nearest rural locality.
