= Mariyevsky Vyselok =

Mariyevsky Vyselok Мариевский Выселок
- Village
- Location within Vologda Oblast Location within Russia
- Coordinates: 59°58′N 46°39′E
- Country: Russia
- Region: Vologda Oblast
- District: Kichmengsko-Gorodetsky District
- Time zone: UTC+3:00

Mariyevsky Vyselok (Russian: Мариевский Выселок) is a rural locality (a village) in Yenangskoye Rural Settlement, Kichmengsko-Gorodetsky District, Vologda Oblast, Russia. The population was 1 as of 2002.

== Geography ==
Mariyevsky Vyselok is located 69 km east of Kichmengsky Gorodok (the district's administrative centre) by road. Myakinnaya is the nearest rural locality.
