= Kobylsk =

Kobylsk Кобыльск
- Selo
- Location within Vologda Oblast Location within Russia
- Coordinates: 60°00′N 46°07′E
- Country: Russia
- Region: Vologda Oblast
- District: Kichmengsko-Gorodetsky District
- Time zone: UTC+3:00

Kobylsk (Russian: Кобыльск) is a rural locality (a selo) in Kichmegnskoye Rural Settlement, Kichmengsko-Gorodetsky District, Vologda Oblast, Russia. The population was 154 as of 2002. There are 6 streets.

== Geography ==
Kobylsk is located 31 km northeast of Kichmengsky Gorodok (the district's administrative centre) by road. Kobylkino is the nearest rural locality.
