= Ustyenskaya =

Ustyenskaya Устьенская
- Village
- Location within Vologda Oblast Location within Russia
- Coordinates: 60°05′N 46°28′E
- Country: Russia
- Region: Vologda Oblast
- District: Kichmengsko-Gorodetsky District
- Time zone: UTC+3:00

Ustyenskaya (Russian: Устьенская) is a rural locality (a village) in Yenangskoye Rural Settlement, Kichmengsko-Gorodetsky District, Vologda Oblast, Russia. The population was 6 as of 2002.

== Geography ==
Ustyenskaya is located 65 km northeast of Kichmengsky Gorodok (the district's administrative centre) by road. Okulovo is the nearest rural locality.
