= Samylovo =

Samylovo Самылово
- Village
- Location within Vologda Oblast Location within Russia
- Coordinates: 59°55′N 45°38′E
- Country: Russia
- Region: Vologda Oblast
- District: Kichmengsko-Gorodetsky District
- Time zone: UTC+3:00

Samylovo (Russian: Самылово) is a rural locality (a village) in Gorodetskoye Rural Settlement, Kichmengsko-Gorodetsky District, Vologda Oblast, Russia. The population was 1 as of 2002.

== Geography ==
Samylovo is located 14 km southwest of Kichmengsky Gorodok (the district's administrative centre) by road. Olyushino is the nearest rural locality.
