= Bersenevo =

Bersenevo Берсенево
- Village
- Location within Vologda Oblast Location within Russia
- Coordinates: 60°05′N 45°33′E
- Country: Russia
- Region: Vologda Oblast
- District: Kichmengsko-Gorodetsky District
- Time zone: UTC+3:00

Bersenevo (Russian: Берсенево) is a rural locality (a village) in Gorodetskoye Rural Settlement, Kichmengsko-Gorodetsky District, Vologda Oblast, Russia. The population was 76 as of 2002. There are 3 streets.

== Geography ==
Bersenevo is located 21 km northwest of Kichmengsky Gorodok (the district's administrative centre) by road. Kholka is the nearest rural locality.
