= Koskovo (selo), Kichmengsko-Gorodetsky District, Vologda Oblast =

Koskovo Косково
- Selo
- Location within Vologda Oblast Location within Russia
- Coordinates: 59°53′N 45°59′E
- Country: Russia
- Region: Vologda Oblast
- District: Kichmengsko-Gorodetsky District
- Time zone: UTC+3:00

Koskovo (Russian: Косково) is a rural locality (a selo) in Kichmegnskoye Rural Settlement, Kichmengsko-Gorodetsky District, Vologda Oblast, Russia. The population was 270 as of 2002. There are 12 streets.

== Geography ==
Koskovo is located 18 km southeast of Kichmengsky Gorodok (the district's administrative centre) by road. Ploskaya is the nearest rural locality.
