= Yermakova Gar =

Yermakova Gar Ермакова Гарь
- Village
- Location within Vologda Oblast Location within Russia
- Coordinates: 60°01′N 45°56′E
- Country: Russia
- Region: Vologda Oblast
- District: Kichmengsko-Gorodetsky District
- Time zone: UTC+3:00

Yermakova Gar (Russian: Ермакова Гарь) is a rural locality (a village) in Kichmengskoye Rural Settlement, Kichmengsko-Gorodetsky District, Vologda Oblast, Russia. The population was 30 as of 2002.

== Geography ==
Yermakova Gar is located 10 km northeast of Kichmengsky Gorodok (the district's administrative centre) by road. Nabolotnaya Gar is the nearest rural locality.
