= Voroninskaya =

Voroninskaya Воронинская
- Village
- Location within Vologda Oblast Location within Russia
- Coordinates: 60°08′N 45°20′E
- Country: Russia
- Region: Vologda Oblast
- District: Kichmengsko-Gorodetsky District
- Time zone: UTC+3:00

Voroninskaya (Russian: Воронинская) is a rural locality (a village) in Gorodetskoye Rural Settlement, Kichmengsko-Gorodetsky District, Vologda Oblast, Russia. The population was 28 as of 2002. There are 2 streets.

== Geography ==
Voroninskaya is located 39 km northwest of Kichmengsky Gorodok (the district's administrative centre) by road. Rossoulinskaya is the nearest rural locality.
