= Manshino =

Manshino Маншино
- Village
- Location within Vologda Oblast Location within Russia
- Coordinates: 59°56′N 46°06′E
- Country: Russia
- Region: Vologda Oblast
- District: Kichmengsko-Gorodetsky District
- Time zone: UTC+3:00

Manshino (Russian: Маншино) is a rural locality (a village) in Kichmegnskoye Rural Settlement, Kichmengsko-Gorodetsky District, Vologda Oblast, Russia. The population was 5 as of 2002.

== Geography ==
Manshino is located 33 km southeast of Kichmengsky Gorodok (the district's administrative centre) by road. Sigovo is the nearest rural locality.
