= Fedyuninskaya, Kichmengsko-Gorodetsky District, Vologda Oblast =

Fedyuninskaya Федюнинская
- Village
- Location within Vologda Oblast Location within Russia
- Coordinates: 60°03′N 46°29′E
- Country: Russia
- Region: Vologda Oblast
- District: Kichmengsko-Gorodetsky District
- Time zone: UTC+3:00

Fedyuninskaya (Russian: Федюнинская) is a rural locality (a village) in Yenangskoye Rural Settlement, Kichmengsko-Gorodetsky District, Vologda Oblast, Russia. The population was 43 as of 2002.

== Geography ==
Fedyuninskaya is located 60 km northeast of Kichmengsky Gorodok (the district's administrative centre) by road. Podgorodye is the nearest rural locality.
