= Dorozhkovo =

Dorozhkovo Дорожково
- Selo
- Location within Vologda Oblast Location within Russia
- Coordinates: 60°01′N 45°59′E
- Country: Russia
- Region: Vologda Oblast
- District: Kichmengsko-Gorodetsky District
- Time zone: UTC+3:00

Dorozhkovo (Russian: Дорожково) is a rural locality (a selo) in Kichmengskoye Rural Settlement, Kichmengsko-Gorodetsky District, Vologda Oblast, Russia. The population was 75 as of 2002. There are 3 streets.

== Geography ==
Dorozhkovo is located 11 km northeast of Kichmengsky Gorodok (the district's administrative centre) by road. Dorozhkovo is the nearest rural locality.
