= Sigovo =

Sigovo Сигово
- Village
- Location within Vologda Oblast Location within Russia
- Coordinates: 59°53′N 46°00′E
- Country: Russia
- Region: Vologda Oblast
- District: Kichmengsko-Gorodetsky District
- Time zone: UTC+3:00

Sigovo (Russian: Сигово) is a rural locality (a village) in Kichmegnskoye Rural Settlement, Kichmengsko-Gorodetsky District, Vologda Oblast, Russia. The population was 54 as of 2002. There are 3 streets.

== Geography ==
Sigovo is located 21 km southeast of Kichmengsky Gorodok (the district's administrative centre) by road. Koskovo is the nearest rural locality.
