= Gorbovo, Kichmengsko-Gorodetsky District, Vologda Oblast =

Gorbovo Горбово
- Village
- Location within Vologda Oblast Location within Russia
- Coordinates: 60°03′N 45°46′E
- Country: Russia
- Region: Vologda Oblast
- District: Kichmengsko-Gorodetsky District
- Time zone: UTC+3:00

Gorbovo (Russian: Горбово) is a rural locality (a village) in Kichmengksoye Rural Settlement, Kichmengsko-Gorodetsky District, Vologda Oblast, Russia. The population was 34 as of 2002.

== Geography ==
Gorbovo is located 10 km north of Kichmengsky Gorodok (the district's administrative centre) by road. Nedubrovo is the nearest rural locality.
