= Spitsyno, Kichmengsko-Gorodetsky District, Vologda Oblast =

Spitsyno Спицыно
- Village
- Location within Vologda Oblast Location within Russia
- Coordinates: 59°58′N 46°04′E
- Country: Russia
- Region: Vologda Oblast
- District: Kichmengsko-Gorodetsky District
- Time zone: UTC+3:00

Spitsyno (Russian: Спицыно) is a rural locality (a village) in Kichmegnskoye Rural Settlement, Kichmengsko-Gorodetsky District, Vologda Oblast, Russia. In 2002, the population was 115. There are two streets.

== Geography ==
Spitsyno is located 26 km southeast of Kichmengsky Gorodok (the district's administrative centre) by road. Akimovo is the nearest rural locality.
