= Isady, Kichmengsko-Gorodetsky District, Vologda Oblast =

Isady Исады
- Village
- Location within Vologda Oblast Location within Russia
- Coordinates: 60°05′N 45°21′E
- Country: Russia
- Region: Vologda Oblast
- District: Kichmengsko-Gorodetsky District
- Time zone: UTC+3:00

Isady (Russian: Исады) is a rural locality (a village) in Gorodetskoye Rural Settlement, Kichmengsko-Gorodetsky District, Vologda Oblast, Russia. The population was 36 as of 2002. There are 2 streets.

== Geography ==
Isady is located 33 km northwest of Kichmengsky Gorodok (the district's administrative centre) by road. Klimovo is the nearest rural locality.
