= Kolotovshchina =

Kolotovshchina Колотовщина
- Village
- Location within Vologda Oblast Location within Russia
- Coordinates: 59°52′N 46°35′E
- Country: Russia
- Region: Vologda Oblast
- District: Kichmengsko-Gorodetsky District
- Time zone: UTC+3:00

Kolotovshchina (Russian: Колотовщина) is a rural locality (a village) in Yenangskoye Rural Settlement, Kichmengsko-Gorodetsky District, Vologda Oblast, Russia. The population was 6 as of 2002.

== Geography ==
Kolotovshchina is located 78 km southeast of Kichmengsky Gorodok (the district's administrative centre) by road. Skoryukovo is the nearest rural locality.
