= Kobylkino =

Kobylkino Кобылкино
- Village
- Location within Vologda Oblast Location within Russia
- Coordinates: 59°59′N 46°07′E
- Country: Russia
- Region: Vologda Oblast
- District: Kichmengsko-Gorodetsky District
- Time zone: UTC+3:00

Kobylkino (Russian: Кобылкино) is a rural locality (a village) in Kichmegnskoye Rural Settlement, Kichmengsko-Gorodetsky District, Vologda Oblast, Russia. The population was 18 as of 2002.

== Geography ==
Kobylkino is located 32 km east of Kichmengsky Gorodok (the district's administrative centre) by road. Kobylsk is the nearest rural locality.
