= Klyukino =

Klyukino Клюкино
- Village
- Location within Vologda Oblast Location within Russia
- Coordinates: 59°58′N 46°03′E
- Country: Russia
- Region: Vologda Oblast
- District: Kichmengsko-Gorodetsky District
- Time zone: UTC+3:00

Klyukino (Russian: Клюкино) is a rural locality (a village) in Kichmegnskoye Rural Settlement, Kichmengsko-Gorodetsky District, Vologda Oblast, Russia. The population was 10 as of 2002.

== Geography ==
Klyukino is located 26 km east of Kichmengsky Gorodok (the district's administrative centre) by road. Gromozovo is the nearest rural locality.
