= Shestakovo, Vologda Oblast =

Shestakovo Шестаково
- Village
- Location within Vologda Oblast Location within Russia
- Coordinates: 60°04′N 46°18′E
- Country: Russia
- Region: Vologda Oblast
- District: Kichmengsko-Gorodetsky District
- Time zone: UTC+3:00

Shestakovo (Russian: Шестаково) is a rural locality (a village) in Kichmegnskoye Rural Settlement, Kichmengsko-Gorodetsky District, Vologda Oblast, Russia. The population was 24 as of 2002.

== Geography ==
Shestakovo is located 31 km northeast of Kichmengsky Gorodok (the district's administrative centre) by road. Kilchenga is the nearest rural locality.
