= Burkovshchina =

Burkovshchina Бурковщина
- Village
- Location within Vologda Oblast Location within Russia
- Coordinates: 60°06′N 46°16′E
- Country: Russia
- Region: Vologda Oblast
- District: Kichmengsko-Gorodetsky District
- Time zone: UTC+3:00

Burkovshchina (Russian: Бурковщина) is a rural locality (a village) in Kichmengskoye Rural Settlement, Kichmengsko-Gorodetsky District, Vologda Oblast, Russia. The population was 11 as of 2002.

== Geography ==
Burkovshchina is located 41 km northeast of Kichmengsky Gorodok (the district's administrative centre) by road. Shemyachkino is the nearest rural locality.
