= Sarmas, Kichmengsko-Gorodetsky District, Vologda Oblast =

Sarmas Сармас
- Settlement
- Location within Vologda Oblast Location within Russia
- Coordinates: 60°17′N 45°02′E
- Country: Russia
- Region: Vologda Oblast
- District: Kichmengsko-Gorodetsky District
- Time zone: UTC+3:00

Sarmas (Russian: Сармас) is a rural locality (a settlement) in Gorodetskoye Rural Settlement, Kichmengsko-Gorodetsky District, Vologda Oblast, Russia. The population was 104 as of 2002. There are 2 streets.

== Geography ==
Sarmas is located 67 km northwest of Kichmengsky Gorodok (the district's administrative centre) by road. Kazarino is the nearest rural locality.
