= Shonga =

Shonga Шонга
- Selo
- Location within Vologda Oblast Location within Russia
- Coordinates: 59°56′N 45°40′E
- Country: Russia
- Region: Vologda Oblast
- District: Kichmengsko-Gorodetsky District
- Time zone: UTC+3:00

Shonga (Russian: Шонга) is a rural locality (a selo) in Gorodetskoye Rural Settlement, Kichmengsko-Gorodetsky District, Vologda Oblast, Russia. The population was 492 as of 2002. There are 9 streets.

== Geography ==
Shonga is located 11 km southwest of Kichmengsky Gorodok (the district's administrative centre) by road. Volkovo is the nearest rural locality.
