= Shatenevo =

Shatenevo Шатенево
- Village
- Location within Vologda Oblast Location within Russia
- Coordinates: 59°54′N 45°27′E
- Country: Russia
- Region: Vologda Oblast
- District: Kichmengsko-Gorodetsky District
- Time zone: UTC+3:00

Shatenevo (Russian: Шатенево) is a rural locality (a village) in Gorodetskoye Rural Settlement, Kichmengsko-Gorodetsky District, Vologda Oblast, Russia. The population was 243 as of 2002. There are 7 streets.

== Geography ==
Shatenevo is located 25 km southwest of Kichmengsky Gorodok (the district's administrative centre) by road. Bolshoye Khavino is the nearest rural locality.
