= Buryakovo =

Buryakovo Буряково
- Village
- Location within Vologda Oblast Location within Russia
- Coordinates: 60°04′N 46°22′E
- Country: Russia
- Region: Vologda Oblast
- District: Kichmengsko-Gorodetsky District
- Time zone: UTC+3:00

Buryakovo (Russian: Буряково) is a rural locality (a village) in Kichmengskoye Rural Settlement, Kichmengsko-Gorodetsky District, Vologda Oblast, Russia. The population was 3 as of 2002.

== Geography ==
Buryakovo is located 35 km northeast of Kichmengsky Gorodok (the district's administrative centre) by road. Shelygino is the nearest rural locality.
