= Baklanovskaya Melnitsa =

Baklanovskaya Melnitsa Баклановская Мельница
- Village
- Location within Vologda Oblast Location within Russia
- Coordinates: 60°11′N 45°16′E
- Country: Russia
- Region: Vologda Oblast
- District: Kichmengsko-Gorodetsky District
- Time zone: UTC+3:00

Baklanovskaya Melnitsa (Russian: Баклановская Мельница) is a rural locality (a village) in Gorodetskoye Rural Settlement, Kichmengsko-Gorodetsky District, Vologda Oblast, Russia. The population was 4 as of 2002.

== Geography ==
Baklanovskaya Melnitsa is located 47 km southwest of Kichmengsky Gorodok (the district's administrative centre) by road. Baklanovo is the nearest rural locality.
