= Lychenitsa =

Lychenitsa Лыченица
- Village
- Location within Vologda Oblast Location within Russia
- Coordinates: 60°01′N 46°06′E
- Country: Russia
- Region: Vologda Oblast
- District: Kichmengsko-Gorodetsky District
- Time zone: UTC+3:00

Lychenitsa (Russian: Лыченица) is a rural locality (a village) in Kichmegnskoye Rural Settlement, Kichmengsko-Gorodetsky District, Vologda Oblast, Russia. The population was 89 as of 2002. There are 2 streets.

== Geography ==
Lychenitsa is located 20 km northeast of Kichmengsky Gorodok (the district's administrative centre) by road. Vymol is the nearest rural locality.
