= Martynovo, Kichmengsko-Gorodetsky District, Vologda Oblast =

Martynovo Мартыново
- Village
- Location within Vologda Oblast Location within Russia
- Coordinates: 60°01′N 46°00′E
- Country: Russia
- Region: Vologda Oblast
- District: Kichmengsko-Gorodetsky District
- Time zone: UTC+3:00

Martynovo (Russian: Мартыново) is a rural locality (a village) in Kichmegnskoye Rural Settlement, Kichmengsko-Gorodetsky District, Vologda Oblast, Russia. The population was 17 as of 2002.

== Geography ==
Martynovo is located 13 km northeast of Kichmengsky Gorodok (the district's administrative centre) by road. Kropachevo is the nearest rural locality.
