= Nizhnyaya Lukina Gora =

Nizhnyaya Lukina Gora Нижняя Лукина Гора
- Village
- Location within Vologda Oblast Location within Russia
- Coordinates: 60°02′N 45°36′E
- Country: Russia
- Region: Vologda Oblast
- District: Kichmengsko-Gorodetsky District
- Time zone: UTC+3:00

Nizhnyaya Lukina Gora (Russian: Нижняя Лукина Гора) is a rural locality (a village) in Gorodetskoye Rural Settlement, Kichmengsko-Gorodetsky District, Vologda Oblast, Russia. The population was 12 as of 2002.

== Geography ==
Nizhnyaya Lukina Gora is located 22 km northwest of Kichmengsky Gorodok (the district's administrative centre) by road. Kichmenga is the nearest rural locality.
