= Laptyug =

Laptyug Лаптюг
- Settlement
- Location within Vologda Oblast Location within Russia
- Coordinates: 60°10′N 45°58′E
- Country: Russia
- Region: Vologda Oblast
- District: Kichmengsko-Gorodetsky District
- Time zone: UTC+3:00

Laptyug (Russian: Лаптюг) is a rural locality (a settlement) in Kichmegnskoye Rural Settlement, Kichmengsko-Gorodetsky District, Vologda Oblast, Russia. The population was 304 as of 2002. There are 7 streets.

== Geography ==
Laptyug is located 26 km northeast of Kichmengsky Gorodok (the district's administrative centre) by road. Polovishchensky is the nearest rural locality.
