= Verkhneye Isakovo =

Verkhneye Isakovo Верхнее Исаково
- Village
- Location within Vologda Oblast Location within Russia
- Coordinates: 59°56′N 45°55′E
- Country: Russia
- Region: Vologda Oblast
- District: Kichmengsko-Gorodetsky District
- Time zone: UTC+3:00

Verkhneye Isakovo (Russian: Верхнее Исаково) is a rural locality (a village) in Yenangskoye Rural Settlement, Kichmengsko-Gorodetsky District, Vologda Oblast, Russia. The population was 1 as of 2002.

== Geography ==
Verkhneye Isakovo is 71 kilometres (44 mi) east of Kichmengsky Gorodok (the district's administrative centre) by road. Podgorye is the nearest rural locality.
