= Olyatovo =

Olyatovo Олятово
- Village
- Location within Vologda Oblast Location within Russia
- Coordinates: 60°04′N 46°28′E
- Country: Russia
- Region: Vologda Oblast
- District: Kichmengsko-Gorodetsky District
- Time zone: UTC+3:00

Olyatovo (Russian: Олятово) is a rural locality (a village) in Yenangskoye Rural Settlement, Kichmengsko-Gorodetsky District, Vologda Oblast, Russia. The population was 185 as of 2002. There are 7 streets.

== Geography ==
Olyatovo is located 62 km northeast of Kichmengsky Gorodok (the district's administrative centre) by road. Okulovo is the nearest rural locality.
