= Ananino, Kichmengsko-Gorodetsky District, Vologda Oblast =

Ananino Ананино
- Village
- Location within Vologda Oblast Location within Russia
- Coordinates: 59°59′N 45°49′E
- Country: Russia
- Region: Vologda Oblast
- District: Kichmengsko-Gorodetsky District
- Time zone: UTC+3:00

Ananino (Russian: Ананино) is a rural locality (a village) in Gorodetskoye Rural Settlement, Kichmengsko-Gorodetsky District, Vologda Oblast, Russia. The population was 457 as of 2002. There are 6 streets.

== Geography ==
Ananino is located 2 km southeast of Kichmengsky Gorodok (the district's administrative centre) by road. Kichmengsky Gorodok is the nearest rural locality.
