= Matino, Vologda Oblast =

Matino Матино
- Village
- Location within Vologda Oblast Location within Russia
- Coordinates: 59°56′N 46°39′E
- Country: Russia
- Region: Vologda Oblast
- District: Kichmengsko-Gorodetsky District
- Time zone: UTC+3:00

Matino (Russian: Матино) is a rural locality (a village) in Yenangskoye Rural Settlement, Kichmengsko-Gorodetsky District, Vologda Oblast, Russia. The population was 18 as of 2002.

== Geography ==
Matino is located 67 km southeast of Kichmengsky Gorodok (the district's administrative centre) by road. Ogryzkovo is the nearest rural locality.
