= Karyug =

Karyug Карюг
- Settlement
- Location within Vologda Oblast Location within Russia
- Coordinates: 59°39′N 46°51′E
- Country: Russia
- Region: Vologda Oblast
- District: Kichmengsko-Gorodetsky District
- Time zone: UTC+3:00

Karyug (Russian: Карюг) is a rural locality (a settlement) in Yenangskoye Rural Settlement, Kichmengsko-Gorodetsky District, Vologda Oblast, Russia. The population was 110 as of 2002.

== Geography ==
Karyug is located 101 km southeast of Kichmengsky Gorodok (the district's administrative centre) by road.
