= Lavrovo, Kichmengsko-Gorodetsky District, Vologda Oblast =

Lavrovo Лаврово
- Village
- Location within Vologda Oblast Location within Russia
- Coordinates: 60°00′N 46°23′E
- Country: Russia
- Region: Vologda Oblast
- District: Kichmengsko-Gorodetsky District
- Time zone: UTC+3:00

Lavrovo (Russian: Лаврово) is a rural locality (a village) in Yenangskoye Rural Settlement, Kichmengsko-Gorodetsky District, Vologda Oblast, Russia. The population was 79 as of 2002.

== Geography ==
Lavrovo is located 41 km east of Kichmengsky Gorodok (the district's administrative centre) by road. Nizhny Yenangsk is the nearest rural locality.
