= Trufanovo, Kichmengsko-Gorodetsky District, Vologda Oblast =

Trufanovo Труфаново Мария
- Village
- Location within Vologda Oblast Location within Russia
- Coordinates: 60°01′N 45°59′E
- Country: Russia
- Region: Vologda Oblast
- District: Kichmengsko-Gorodetsky District
- Time zone: UTC+3:00

Trufanovo (Russian: Труфаново) is a rural locality (a village) in Kichmengskoye Rural Settlement, Kichmengsko-Gorodetsky District, Vologda Oblast, Russia. The population was 25 as of 2002.

== Geography ==
Trufanovo is located 12 km northeast of Kichmengsky Gorodok (the district's administrative centre) by road. Martynovo is the nearest locality.
