= Novaya Shilovshchina =

Novaya Shilovshchina Новая Шиловщина
- Village
- Location within Vologda Oblast Location within Russia
- Coordinates: 59°52′N 46°41′E
- Country: Russia
- Region: Vologda Oblast
- District: Kichmengsko-Gorodetsky District
- Time zone: UTC+3:00

Novaya Shilovshchina (Russian: Новая Шиловщина) is a rural locality (a village) in Yenangskoye Rural Settlement, Kichmengsko-Gorodetsky District, Vologda Oblast, Russia. The population was 4 as of 2002.

== Geography ==
Novaya Shilovshchina is located 75 km southeast of Kichmengsky Gorodok (the district's administrative centre) by road. Staraya Shilovshchina is the nearest rural locality.
