= Koskovo (village), Kichmengsko-Gorodetsky District, Vologda Oblast =

Koskovo Косково
- Village
- Location within Vologda Oblast Location within Russia
- Coordinates: 59°52′N 46°01′E
- Country: Russia
- Region: Vologda Oblast
- District: Kichmengsko-Gorodetsky District
- Time zone: UTC+3:00

Koskovo (Russian: Косково) is a rural locality (a village) in Kichmegnskoye Rural Settlement, Kichmengsko-Gorodetsky District, Vologda Oblast, Russia. The population was 26 as of 2002. There are 2 streets.

== Geography ==
Koskovo is located 20 km southeast of Kichmengsky Gorodok (the district's administrative centre) by road.
