= Knyazhigora =

Knyazhigora Княжигора
- Village
- Location within Vologda Oblast Location within Russia
- Coordinates: 59°59′N 45°50′E
- Country: Russia
- Region: Vologda Oblast
- District: Kichmengsko-Gorodetsky District
- Time zone: UTC+3:00

Knyazhigora (Russian: Княжигора) is a rural locality (a village) in Gorodetskoye Rural Settlement, Kichmengsko-Gorodetsky District, Vologda Oblast, Russia. The population was 205 as of 2002. There are 4 streets.

== Geography ==
Knyazhigora is located 3 km northeast of Kichmengsky Gorodok (the district's administrative centre) by road. Podol is the nearest rural locality.
