= Ustye Kharyuzovo =

Ustye Kharyuzovo Устье Харюзово
- Settlement
- Location within Vologda Oblast Location within Russia
- Coordinates: 59°45′N 46°35′E
- Country: Russia
- Region: Vologda Oblast
- District: Kichmengsko-Gorodetsky District
- Time zone: UTC+3:00

Ustye Kharyuzovo (Russian: Устье Харюзово) is a rural locality (a settlement) in Yenangskoye Rural Settlement, Kichmengsko-Gorodetsky District, Vologda Oblast, Russia. The population was 181 as of 2002.

== Geography ==
Ustye Kharyuzovo is located 85 km southeast of Kichmengsky Gorodok (the district's administrative centre) by road. Panovo is the nearest rural locality.
