= Sever, Vologda Oblast =

Sever Север
- Village
- Location within Vologda Oblast Location within Russia
- Coordinates: 59°55′N 45°57′E
- Country: Russia
- Region: Vologda Oblast
- District: Kichmengsko-Gorodetsky District
- Time zone: UTC+3:00

Sever (Russian: Север) is a rural locality (a village) in Kichmegnskoye Rural Settlement, Kichmengsko-Gorodetsky District, Vologda Oblast, Russia. The population was 23 as of 2002.

== Geography ==
Sever is located 15 km southeast of Kichmengsky Gorodok (the district's administrative centre) by road. Bolshoye Burtanovo is the nearest rural locality.
