= Pomelovka =

Pomelovka Помеловка
- Village
- Location within Vologda Oblast Location within Russia
- Coordinates: 59°57′N 45°43′E
- Country: Russia
- Region: Vologda Oblast
- District: Kichmengsko-Gorodetsky District
- Time zone: UTC+3:00

Pomelovka (Russian: Помеловка) is a rural locality (a village) in Kichmegnskoye Rural Settlement, Kichmengsko-Gorodetsky District, Vologda Oblast, Russia. The population was 22 as of 2002.

== Geography ==
Pomelovka is located 11 km southwest of Kichmengsky Gorodok (the district's administrative centre) by road. Navolok is the nearest rural locality.
