= Bolshoye Burtanovo =

Bolshoye Burtanovo Большое Буртаново
- Village
- Location within Vologda Oblast Location within Russia
- Coordinates: 59°55′N 45°56′E
- Country: Russia
- Region: Vologda Oblast
- District: Kichmengsko-Gorodetsky District
- Time zone: UTC+3:00

Bolshoye Burtanovo (Russian: Большое Буртаново) is a rural locality (a village) in Kichmengskoye Rural Settlement, Kichmengsko-Gorodetsky District, Vologda Oblast, Russia. The population was 160 as of 2002. There are 4 streets.

== Geography ==
Bolshoye Burtanovo is located 14 km southeast of Kichmengsky Gorodok (the district's administrative centre) by road. Sever is the nearest rural locality.
