= Petryanino =

Petryanino Петрянино
- Village
- Location within Vologda Oblast Location within Russia
- Coordinates: 60°04′N 45°20′E
- Country: Russia
- Region: Vologda Oblast
- District: Kichmengsko-Gorodetsky District
- Time zone: UTC+3:00

Petryanino (рус. Петрянино) is a rural locality (a village) in Gorodetskoye Rural Settlement, Kichmengsko-Gorodetsky District, Vologda Oblast, Russia. The population was 38 as of 2002. There are 4 streets.

== Geography ==
Petryanino is located 35 km northwest of Kichmengsky Gorodok (the district's administrative centre) by road. Isady is the nearest rural locality.
