= Tokarevo, Kichmengsko-Gorodetsky District, Vologda Oblast =

Tokarevo Токарево
- Village
- Location within Vologda Oblast Location within Russia
- Coordinates: 60°04′N 45°35′E
- Country: Russia
- Region: Vologda Oblast
- District: Kichmengsko-Gorodetsky District
- Time zone: UTC+3:00

Tokarevo (Russian: Токарево) is a rural locality (a village) in Gorodetskoye Rural Settlement, Kichmengsko-Gorodetsky District, Vologda Oblast, Russia. The population was 68 as of 2002. There are 2 streets.

== Geography ==
Tokarevo is located 19 km northwest of Kichmengsky Gorodok (the district's administrative centre) by road. Grigorovo is the nearest rural locality.
