= Kazarino, Vologda Oblast =

Kazarino Казарино
- Village
- Location within Vologda Oblast Location within Russia
- Coordinates: 60°13′N 45°03′E
- Country: Russia
- Region: Vologda Oblast
- District: Kichmengsko-Gorodetsky District
- Time zone: UTC+3:00

Kazarino (Russian: Казарино) is a rural locality (a village) in Gorodetskoye Rural Settlement, Kichmengsko-Gorodetsky District, Vologda Oblast, Russia. The population was 37 as of 2002.

== Geography ==
Kazarino is located 60 km northwest of Kichmengsky Gorodok (the district's administrative centre) by road. Svetitsa is the nearest rural locality.
