= Klepikovo, Kichmengsko-Gorodetsky District, Vologda Oblast =

Klepikovo Клепиково
- Village
- Location within Vologda Oblast Location within Russia
- Coordinates: 60°05′N 45°36′E
- Country: Russia
- Region: Vologda Oblast
- District: Kichmengsko-Gorodetsky District
- Time zone: UTC+3:00

Klepikovo (Russian: Клепиково) is a rural locality (a village) in Gorodetskoye Rural Settlement, Kichmengsko-Gorodetsky District, Vologda Oblast, Russia. The population was 52 as of 2002. There are 3 streets.

== Geography ==
Klepikovo is located 18 km northwest of Kichmengsky Gorodok (the district's administrative centre) by road. Tokarevo is the nearest rural locality.
