= Bolshoye Chekavino =

Bolshoye Chekavino Большое Чекавино
- Village
- Location within Vologda Oblast Location within Russia
- Coordinates: 59°58′N 45°50′E
- Country: Russia
- Region: Vologda Oblast
- District: Kichmengsko-Gorodetsky District
- Time zone: UTC+3:00

Bolshoye Chekavino (Russian: Большое Чекавино) is a rural locality (a village) in Kichmengskoye Rural Settlement, Kichmengsko-Gorodetsky District, Vologda Oblast, Russia. The population was 46 as of 2002. There are 2 streets.

== Geography ==
Bolshoye Chekavino is located 3 km southeast of Kichmengsky Gorodok (the district's administrative centre) by road. Gorodishche is the nearest rural locality.
