= Podgorka =

Podgorka Подгорка
- Village
- Location within Vologda Oblast Location within Russia
- Coordinates: 60°03′N 45°52′E
- Country: Russia
- Region: Vologda Oblast
- District: Kichmengsko-Gorodetsky District
- Time zone: UTC+3:00

Podgorka (Russian: Подгорка) is a rural locality (a village) in Kichmegnskoye Rural Settlement, Kichmengsko-Gorodetsky District, Vologda Oblast, Russia. The population was 28 as of 2002.

== Geography ==
Podgorka is located 9 km northeast of Kichmengsky Gorodok (the district's administrative centre) by road. Podvolochye is the nearest rural locality.
