= Nizhny Yenangsk =

Nizhny Yenangsk Нижний Енангск
- Selo
- Location within Vologda Oblast Location within Russia
- Coordinates: 59°59′N 46°23′E
- Country: Russia
- Region: Vologda Oblast
- District: Kichmengsko-Gorodetsky District
- Time zone: UTC+3:00

Nizhny Yenangsk (Russian: Нижний Енангск) is a rural locality (a selo) and the administrative center of Yenangskoye Rural Settlement, Kichmengsko-Gorodetsky District, Vologda Oblast, Russia. The population was 33 as of 2002. There are 11 streets.

== Geography ==
Nizhny Yenangsk is located 50 km east of Kichmengsky Gorodok (the district's administrative centre) by road. Rudnikovo is the nearest rural locality.
