= Kichmenga (river) =

Kichmenga Russian: Кичменьга

Location
- Country: Russia

Physical characteristics
- Mouth: Yug
  - coordinates: 59°58′52″N 45°47′48″E
- Length: 208 km (129 mi)
- Basin size: 2,330 km^{2} (900 sq mi)
- Discharge
  - average: 18.8 cubic metres per second (660 cu ft/s)

Basin features
- Progression: Yug→ Northern Dvina→ White Sea

The Kichmenga (Russian: Кичменьга, Кичменга) is a river in Kichmengsko-Gorodetsky and Velikoustyugsky Districts of Vologda Oblast in Russia. It is a left tributary of the Yug. It is 208 kilometres (129 mi) long, and the area of its basin 2,330 square kilometres (900 sq mi). Its main tributary is the Svetitsa (right).

The Kichmenga basin covers almost the whole part of Kichmengsko-Gorodetsky District west of the Yug, as well as areas in the south of Velikoustyugsky District, southeast of Nyuksensky District, and north of Nikolsky District.

The source of the Kichmenga is in the northern part of Kichmengsko-Gorodetsky District, northwest of the village of Kalinovskaya. The Kichmenga flows north and enters Velikoustyugsky District, at the selo of Mokeikha turns west, re-enters Kichmengsko-Gorodetsky District, and turns south. In the village of Svetitsa the Kichmenga accepts from the right the Svetitsa River and turns southeast. Below Svetitsa, the valley of the Kichmenga is populated, with the road running on the right band of the river. The mouth of the Kichmenga is in the selo of Kichmengsky Gorodok, the center of the district.
