= Kichmengsko-Gorodetsky District =

Kichmengsko-Gorodetsky District Кичменгско-Городецкий район (Russian)
- District
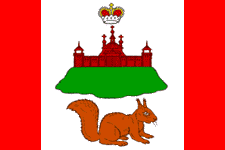
- Flag Coat of arms
- Location of Kichmengsko-Gorodetsky District in Vologda Oblast
- Coordinates: 59°59′N 45°49′E
- Country: Russia
- Federal subject: Vologda Oblast
- Established: June 10, 1924
- Administrative center: Kichmengsky Gorodok

Area
  - Total: 7,025 km^{2} (2,712 sq mi)

Population (2010 Census)
  - Total: 18,485
  - Density: 2.631/km^{2} (6.815/sq mi)
  - Urban: 0%
  - Rural: 100%

Administrative structure
  - Administrative divisions: 17 Selsoviets
  - Inhabited localities: 357 rural localities

Municipal structure
  - Municipally incorporated as: Kichmengsko-Gorodetsky Municipal District
  - Municipal divisions: 0 urban settlements, 3 rural settlements
- Time zone: UTC+3 (MSK)
- OKTMO ID: 19530000
- Website: http://kichgorod.ru/in/md/main

Kichmengsko-Gorodetsky District (Russian: Ки́чменгско-Городе́цкий райо́н) is an administrative and municipal district (raion), one of the twenty-six in Vologda Oblast, Russia. It is located in the east of the oblast and borders with Velikoustyugsky District in the north, Podosinovsky District of Kirov Oblast in the northeast, Oparinsky District of Kirov Oblast in the southeast, Vokhomsky District of Kostroma Oblast in the south, Nikolsky and Babushkinsky Districts in the southwest, and with Nyuksensky District in the northwest. The area of the district is 7,025 square kilometers (2,712 sq mi). Its administrative center is the rural locality (a selo) of Kichmengsky Gorodok. The district's population: 18,485 (2010 census); 22,187 (2002 Census); 26,170 (1989 Soviet census). The population of Kichmengsky Gorodok accounts for 34.9% of the district's total population.

== Geography ==
Almost all of the district belongs to the basin of the Yug and two of its main tributaries, the Kichmenga (left) and the Yontala (right). Only a few rivers in the northwest of the district drain into the Sukhona. The Yug starts in the south of the district, flows south, exits the district, then makes a bow through the town of Nikolsk and reenters the district, crossing it from southwest to northeast before entering Kirov Oblast.

Much of the district is covered by coniferous forests (taiga). The district area is hilly and belongs to the Northern Ridge hill chain.

== History ==
The area was populated by Finnic peoples and then colonized by the Novgorod Republic. Kichmengsky Gorodok was first mentioned in chronicles in 1468. At that time, the fortress of Kichmengsky Gorodok was dependent on Veliky Ustyug, and Tatars took it and set it to fire, together with all its population.

In the course of the administrative reform carried out in 1708 by Peter the Great, the area was included into Archangelgorod Governorate. From 1719, Kichmengsky Gorodok was in Ustyug Province, one of the four provinces of Archangelgorod Governorate. In 1780, the governorate was abolished, and transformed into Vologda Viceroyalty. The latter was abolished in 1796, and Kichmengsky Gorodok became the seat of Kichmengskaya Volost of Nikolsky Uyezd of Vologda Governorate. In 1918, the area was transferred to the newly established Northern Dvina Governorate with the administrative center located in Veliky Ustyug. In 1924, the uyezds were abolished in favor of the new divisions, the districts (raions).

On June 10, 1924, Kichmengsko-Gorodetsky District was established. In 1929, Northern Dvina Governorate was merged into Northern Krai. The krai consisted of five okrugs, one of which, Northern Dvina Okrug, had its administrative center in Veliky Ustyug. Kichmengsko-Gorodetsky District became a part of Northern Dvina Okrug. In July 1930, the okrugs were abolished, and the districts were directly subordinated to Northern Krai. In 1936, Northern Krai was transformed into Northern Oblast, and in 1937, Northern Oblast was split into Arkhangelsk Oblast and Vologda Oblast. Kichmengsko-Gorodetsky District remained in Vologda Oblast ever since.

On June 10, 1924, Yenangsky District with the administrative center in the selo of Nizhny Yenangsk was also established. It was abolished on February 27, 1928. Its area was merged into Kichmengsko-Gorodetsky District.

== Economy ==
The economy of the district is based on the timber industry. The agriculture specializes mostly on meat and milk production. Traditionally, crops and linum have been grown.

Kichmengsky Gorodok is located on the paved road which connects Kotlas and Veliky Ustyug in the north and Nikolsk and Manturovo in the south. Another, unpaved, road connects Kichmengsky Gorodok with Podosinovets in Kirov Oblast. There is bus traffic in transit, as well as local bus traffic originating from Kichmengsky Gorodok.

Kichmengsky Gorodok is served by the Kichmengsky Gorodok Airport; there is occasional passenger service to Vologda.

== Culture and recreation ==
The district contains twenty-five objects classified as cultural and historical heritage of local importance. Most of these are wooden farms and churches built prior to 1917.

The only state museum in the district is the Kichmengsko-Gorodetsky District Museum, founded in 1983 and located in Kichmengsky Gorodok.
