= Kichmengsky Gorodok =

Kichmengsky Gorodok Кичменгский Городок
- Selo
- Interactive map of Kichmengsky Gorodok
- Location of Kichmengsky Gorodok Kichmengsky Gorodok (Vologda Oblast)
- Coordinates: 59°59′N 45°49′E
- Country: Russia
- Federal subject: Vologda Oblast
- Administrative district: Kichmengsko-Gorodetsky District
- Selsoviet: Kichmengsky Selsoviet
- Founded: 1468

Population (2010 Census)
  - Total: 6,443
  - Estimate (2021): 6,103 (−5.3%)

Administrative status
  - Capital of: Tarnogsky District, Tarnogsky Selsoviet

Municipal status
  - Municipal district: Kichmengsko-Gorodetsky Municipal District
  - Rural settlement: Kichmengskoye Rural Settlement
  - Capital of: Kichmengsko-Gorodetsky Municipal District, Kichmengskoye Rural Settlement
- Time zone: UTC+3 (MSK)
- Postal code: 161400
- OKTMO ID: 19630408101

Kichmengsky Gorodok (Russian: Ки́чменгский Городо́к) is a rural locality (a selo) and the administrative center of Kichmengsko-Gorodetsky District, Vologda Oblast, Russia, located on the left bank of the Yug River, at its confluence with the Kichmenga River. It also serves as the administrative center of Kichmengsky Selsoviet, one of the seventeen selsoviets into which the district is administratively divided. Municipally, it is the administrative center of Kichmengskoye Rural Settlement. Population: 6,443 (2010 census); 6,754 (2002 census); 6,766 (1989 Soviet census).

== History ==
Kichmengsky Gorodok is first mentioned in chronicles in 1468. At that time, the fortress of Kichmengsky Gorodok was dependent on Veliky Ustyug, and Tatars took it and set it to fire, together with all its population.

In the course of the administrative reform carried out in 1708 by Peter the Great the area was included into Archangelgorod Governorate. From 1719, Kichmengsky Gorodok was in Ustyug Province, one of the four provinces of Archangelgorod Governorate. In 1780, the governorate was abolished, and transformed into Vologda Viceroyalty. The latter was abolished in 1796, and Kichmengsky Gorodok became the center of Kichmengskaya Volost of Nikolsky Uyezd of Vologda Governorate. In 1918, the area was transferred to the newly established Northern Dvina Governorate with the administrative center located in Veliky Ustyug. In 1924 the uyezds were abolished in favor of the new divisions, the districts (raions). On June 10, 1924 Kichmengsko-Gorodetsky District was established, with the administrative center in Kichmengsky Gorodok.

== Economy ==
The economy of Kichmengsky Gorodok is based on the timber industry and food industry.

Kichmengsky Gorodok is located on the paved road which connects Kotlas and Veliky Ustyug in the north and Nikolsk and Manturovo to the south. Another, unpaved, road connects Kichmengsky Gorodok with Podosinovets in Kirov Oblast. There is bus traffic in transit, as well as local bus traffic originating from Kichmengsky Gorodok.

Kichmengsky Gorodok is served by the Kichmengsky Gorodok Airport, there is occasional passenger service to Vologda.

== Culture and recreation ==
The district contains seven objects classified as cultural and historical heritage of local importance. These include the ensemble of the former center of the village with trade arcades and a warehouse, and three churches, the Assumption Church (between 1893 and 1896), the Church of Archangel Michael, and the Church of the Virgin.

Kichmengsky Gorodok hosts the Kichmengsko-Gorodetsky District Museum, founded in 1983.
