= Alexeyevo =

Alexeyevo may refer to the following rural localities in Russia:

- Alexeyevo, Mezhdurechensky District, Vologda Oblast
- Alexeyevo, Nesvoysky Selsoviet, Vologodsky District, Vologda Oblast
- Alexeyevo, Sheksninsky District, Vologda Oblast
- Alexeyevo, Sokolsky District, Vologda Oblast
- Alexeyevo, Staroselskoye Rural Settlement, Vologodsky District, Vologda Oblast
- Alexeyevo, Ustyuzhensky District, Vologda Oblast
- Alexeyevo, Vysokovsky Selsoviet, Vologodsky District, Vologda Oblast
