= Konyukhovo =

Konyukhovo or Konyukhovskaya (Russian: Конюхо́во) is the name of several rural localities (villages) in Russia:

- Konyukhovo, Vladimir Oblast, a village in Alexandrovsky District, Vladimir Oblast
- Konyukhovo, Ustyuzhensky District, Vologda Oblast, a village in Ustyuzhensky District, Vologda Oblast
- Konyukhovo, Vologodsky District, Vologda Oblast, a village in Vologodsky District, Vologda Oblast
- Konyukhovskaya, a village in Tarnogsky District, Vologda Oblast

== See also ==
- Konyukhov, a surname
- Konyukhi, a settlement in Altai Krai
