= Konyukhovo, Vologodsky District, Vologda Oblast =

Konyukhovo Конюхово
- Village
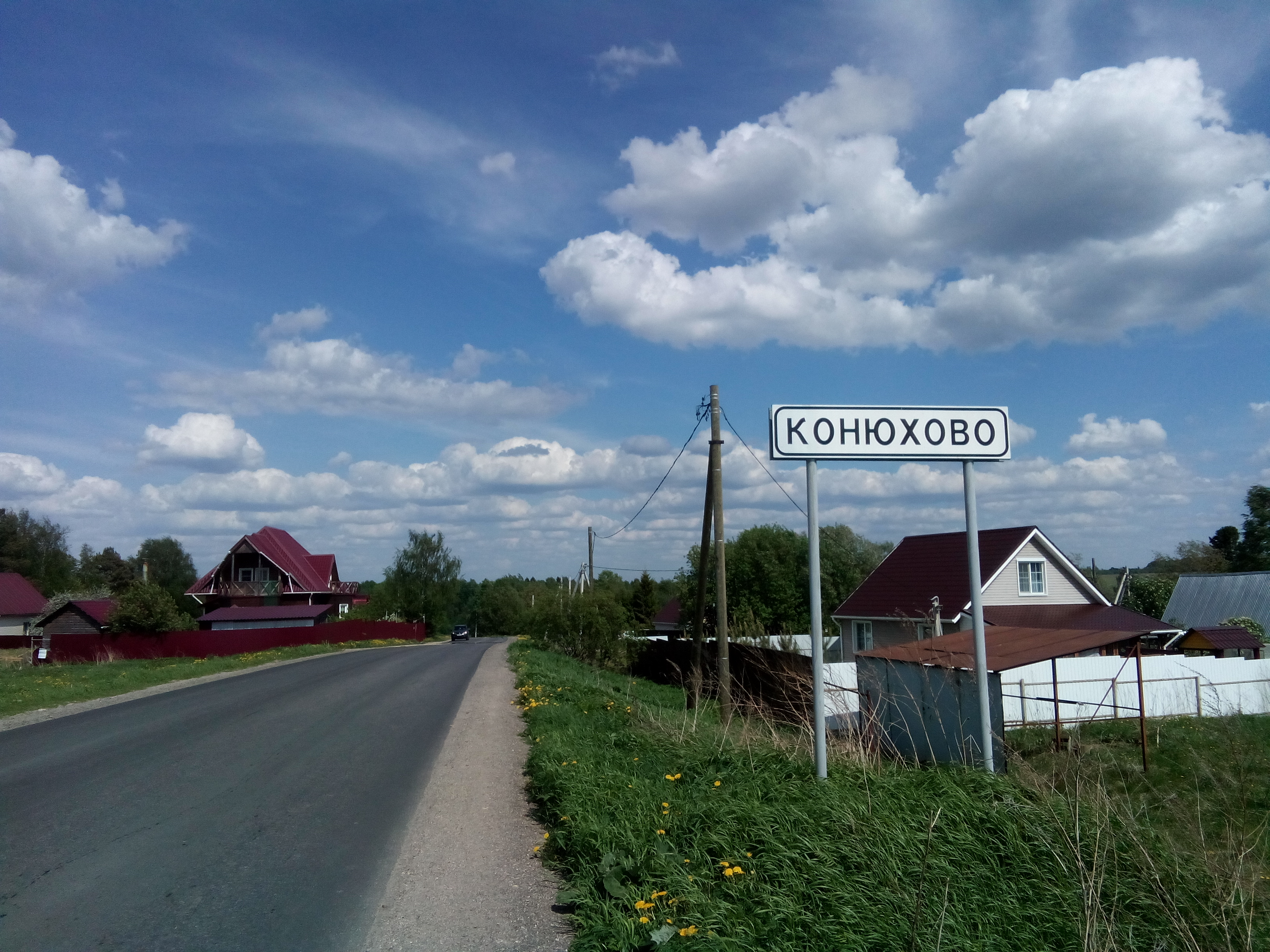

- Location within Vologda Oblast Location within Russia
- Coordinates: 59°07′N 39°58′E
- Region: Vologda Oblast
- Time zone: UTC+3:00

Konyukhovo (Russian: Конюхо́во) is a rural locality (a village) in Vologodsky District, Vologda Oblast, Russia. It is located on Losta River. The population was 0 as of 2002 and 2010.

== Geography ==
The distance to Vologda is 21 km, 8 km to Ogarkovo. The nearest rural localities are Kishkintso, Nevinnikovo, Snasudovo and Yuryevtsevo.
