= Losta =

River in Russia

Losta Russian: Лоста

Location
- Country: Russia

Physical characteristics
- Mouth: Lezha
  - coordinates: 59°00′42″N 39°46′26″E
- Length: 38 km (24 mi)

Losta (Russian: Лоста) is a river in Vologodsky District, Vologda Oblast, Russia. It is 38 kilometres long, and starts from Lezha river near Kraskovo, ends by flowing back into Lezha.

== Rural localities ==
The rural localities (villages) located on Losta are:

- Golenevo
- Konyukhovo
- Kishkino
