= Tupitsyno =

Tupitsyno may refer to:

- Tupitsyno, Mezhdurechensky District, Vologda Oblast
- Tupitsyno, Sokolsky District, Vologda Oblast
- Tupitsyno, Vozhegodsky District, Vologda Oblast
