= Golubi =

Golubi Голуби
- Village
- Location within Vologda Oblast Location within Russia
- Coordinates: 59°27′N 41°39′E
- Country: Russia
- Region: Vologda Oblast
- District: Mezhdurechensky District
- Time zone: UTC+3:00

Golubi (Russian: Голуби) is a rural locality (a village) in Turovetskoye Rural Settlement, Mezhdurechensky District, Vologda Oblast, Russia. The population was 1 as of 2002.

== Geography ==
Golubi is located 253 km northeast of Shuyskoye (the district's administrative centre) by road. Kozhukhovo is the nearest rural locality.
