= Krasotinka =

Krasotinka Красотинка
- Village
- Location within Vologda Oblast Location within Russia
- Coordinates: 59°23′N 41°11′E
- Country: Russia
- Region: Vologda Oblast
- District: Mezhdurechensky District
- Time zone: UTC+3:00

Krasotinka (Russian: Красотинка) is a rural locality (a village) in Sukhonskoye Rural Settlement, Mezhdurechensky District, Vologda Oblast, Russia. The population was 5 as of 2002.

== Geography ==
Krasotinka is located 3 km northeast of Shuyskoye (the district's administrative centre) by road. Malaya Storona is the nearest rural locality.
