= Sarantsyno =

Sarantsyno Саранцыно
- Village
- Location within Vologda Oblast Location within Russia
- Coordinates: 59°12′N 40°33′E
- Country: Russia
- Region: Vologda Oblast
- District: Mezhdurechensky District
- Time zone: UTC+3:00

Sarantsyno (Russian: Саранцыно) is a rural locality (a village) in Botanovskoye Rural Settlement, Mezhdurechensky District, Vologda Oblast, Russia. The population was 8 as of 2002.

== Geography ==
Sarantsyno is located 36 km southwest of Shuyskoye (the district's administrative centre) by road. Svatilovo is the nearest rural locality.
