= Tolshma =

Tolshma Russian: Толшма

Location
- Country: Russia

Physical characteristics
- Mouth: Sukhona
  - coordinates: 59°38′52″N 42°13′23″E
- Length: 157 km (98 mi)
- Basin size: 1,540 km^{2} (590 sq mi)

Basin features
- Progression: Sukhona→ Northern Dvina→ White Sea

The Tolshma (Russian: Толшма) is a river in Soligalichsky District of Kostroma Oblast and Totemsky District of Vologda Oblast in Russia. It is a right tributary of the Sukhona. The river is 157 kilometres (98 mi) long. The area of its basin is 1,540 square kilometres (590 sq mi). The principal tributary is the Yelshma (right).

The basin of the Tolshma lies in the western part of the Northern Ridge chain of hills, which separates the basins of the rivers Sukhona and Kostroma, and thus the basins of the White and the Caspian Seas. The source of the Tolshma is located in the north of the Kostroma Oblast, northwest of the town of Soligalich. The Tolshma flows to the northwest, sharply turns to the northeast, enters Vologda Oblast, accepts the Yelshma from the right and turns northwest again. The mouth of the Tolshma is located in the selo of Krasnoye.

On July 15, 1929 Tolshmensky District with the center in the selo of Krasnoye was established. On July 30, 1931 it was abolished, and its area was divided between Shuysky and Totemsky Districts. The name of the district originated from the Tolshma.

The Tolshma was used for timber rafting until the 1990s.
