= Turybanino =

Turybanino Турыбанино
- Village
- Location within Vologda Oblast Location within Russia
- Coordinates: 59°14′N 40°54′E
- Country: Russia
- Region: Vologda Oblast
- District: Mezhdurechensky District
- Time zone: UTC+3:00

Turybanino (Russian: Турыбанино) is a rural locality (a village) in Sheybukhtovskoye Rural Settlement, Mezhdurechensky District, Vologda Oblast, Russia. The population was 19 as of 2002.

== Geography ==
Turybanino is located 20 km southwest of Shuyskoye (the district's administrative centre) by road. Yusovo is the nearest rural locality.
