= Alexandrovka, Vologda Oblast =

Alexandrovka Александровка
- Village
- Location within Vologda Oblast Location within Russia
- Coordinates: 59°23′N 41°10′E
- Country: Russia
- Region: Vologda Oblast
- District: Mezhdurechensky District
- Time zone: UTC+3:00

Alexandrovka (Russian: Александровка) is a rural locality (a village) in Sukhonskoye Rural Settlement, Mezhdurechensky District, Vologda Oblast, Russia. The population was 2 as of 2002.

== Geography ==
Alexandrovka is located 3 km east of Shuyskoye (the district's administrative centre) by road. Malaya Storona is the nearest rural locality.
