= Protasovo, Vologda Oblast =

Protasovo Протасово
- Village
- Location within Vologda Oblast Location within Russia
- Coordinates: 59°10′N 40°43′E
- Country: Russia
- Region: Vologda Oblast
- District: Mezhdurechensky District
- Time zone: UTC+3:00

Protasovo (Russian: Протасово) is a rural locality (a village) in Botanovskoye Rural Settlement, Mezhdurechensky District, Vologda Oblast, Russia. The population was 30 as of 2002.

== Geography ==
Protasovo is located 33 km southwest of Shuyskoye (the district's administrative centre) by road. Shetenevo is the nearest rural locality.
