= Ognevo =

Ognevo Огнево
- Village
- Location within Vologda Oblast Location within Russia
- Coordinates: 59°10′N 40°34′E
- Country: Russia
- Region: Vologda Oblast
- District: Mezhdurechensky District
- Time zone: UTC+3:00

Ognevo (Russian: Огнево) is a rural locality (a village) in Botanovskoye Rural Settlement, Mezhdurechensky District, Vologda Oblast, Russia. The population was 15 as of 2002.

== Geography ==
Ognevo is located 37 km southwest of Shuyskoye (the district's administrative centre) by road. Yershovo is the nearest rural locality.
