= Serednevo =

Serednevo Середнево
- Village
- Location within Vologda Oblast Location within Russia
- Coordinates: 59°18′N 41°03′E
- Country: Russia
- Region: Vologda Oblast
- District: Mezhdurechensky District
- Time zone: UTC+3:00

Serednevo (Russian: Середнево) is a rural locality (a village) in Sukhonskoye Rural Settlement, Mezhdurechensky District, Vologda Oblast, Russia. The population was 2 as of 2002.

== Geography ==
Serednevo is located 8 km south of Shuyskoye (the district's administrative centre) by road. Kozlanga is the nearest rural locality.
