= Igumnitsevo =

Igumnitsevo Игумницево
- Village
- Location within Vologda Oblast Location within Russia
- Coordinates: 59°11′N 40°40′E
- Country: Russia
- Region: Vologda Oblast
- District: Mezhdurechensky District
- Time zone: UTC+3:00

Igumnitsevo (Russian: Игумницево) is a rural locality (a village) and the administrative center of Botanovskoye Rural Settlement, Mezhdurechensky District, Vologda Oblast, Russia. The population was 415 as of 2002. There are 8 streets.

== Geography ==
Igumnitsevo is located 30 km southwest of Shuyskoye (the district's administrative centre) by road. Ushakovo is the nearest rural locality.
