= Artemyevo, Mezhdurechensky District, Vologda Oblast =

Artemyevo Артемьево
- Village
- Location within Vologda Oblast Location within Russia
- Coordinates: 59°16′N 40°41′E
- Country: Russia
- Region: Vologda Oblast
- District: Mezhdurechensky District
- Time zone: UTC+3:00

Artemyevo (Russian: Артемьево) is a rural locality (a village) in Staroselskoye Rural Settlement, Mezhdurechensky District, Vologda Oblast, Russia. The population was 8 as of 2002.

== Geography ==
Artemyevo is located 27 km southwest of Shuyskoye (the district's administrative centre) by road. Sovka is the nearest rural locality.
