= Shingarskoye Isady =

Shingarskoye Isady Шингарские Исады
- Village
- Location within Vologda Oblast Location within Russia
- Coordinates: 59°14′N 40°35′E
- Country: Russia
- Region: Vologda Oblast
- District: Mezhdurechensky District
- Time zone: UTC+3:00

Shingarskoye Isady (Russian: Шингарские Исады) is a rural locality (a village) in Botanovskoye Rural Settlement, Mezhdurechensky District, Vologda Oblast, Russia. The population was 2 as of 2002.

== Geography ==
Shingarskoye Isady is located 35 km southwest of Shuyskoye (the district's administrative centre) by road. Novoye is the nearest rural locality.
