= Kozhukhovo, Mezhdurechensky District, Vologda Oblast =

Kozhukhovo Кожухово
- Village
- Location within Vologda Oblast Location within Russia
- Coordinates: 59°28′N 41°43′E
- Country: Russia
- Region: Vologda Oblast
- District: Mezhdurechensky District
- Time zone: UTC+3:00

Kozhukhovo (Russian: Кожухово) is a rural locality (a village) in Turovetskoye Rural Settlement, Mezhdurechensky District, Vologda Oblast, Russia. The population was 68 as of 2002. There are 3 streets.

== Geography ==
Kozhukhovo is located 266 km northeast of Shuyskoye (the district's administrative centre) by road. Selishcha is the nearest rural locality.
