= Podgornovo =

Podgornovo Подгорново
- Village
- Location within Vologda Oblast Location within Russia
- Coordinates: 59°12′N 40°48′E
- Country: Russia
- Region: Vologda Oblast
- District: Mezhdurechensky District
- Time zone: UTC+3:00

Podgornovo (Russian: Подгорново) is a rural locality (a village) in Staroselskoye Rural Settlement, Mezhdurechensky District, Vologda Oblast, Russia. The population was 5 as of 2002.

== Geography ==
Podgornovo is located 25 km southwest of Shuyskoye (the district's administrative centre) by road. Vysokovo is the nearest rural locality.
