= Shetenevo =

Shetenevo Шетенево
- Village
- Location within Vologda Oblast Location within Russia
- Coordinates: 59°10′N 40°44′E
- Country: Russia
- Region: Vologda Oblast
- District: Mezhdurechensky District
- Time zone: UTC+3:00

Shetenevo (Russian: Шетенево) is a rural locality (village) in Botanovskoye Rural Settlement, Mezhdurechensky District, Vologda Oblast, Russia. The population was 8 as of 2002.

== Geography ==
Shetenevo is located 33 km southwest of Shuyskoye (the district's administrative centre) by road. Protasovo is the nearest rural locality.
