= Penyevo =

Penyevo Пеньево
- Village
- Location within Vologda Oblast Location within Russia
- Coordinates: 59°11′N 40°46′E
- Country: Russia
- Region: Vologda Oblast
- District: Mezhdurechensky District
- Time zone: UTC+3:00

Penyevo (Russian: Пеньево) is a rural locality (a village) in Staroselskoye Rural Settlement, Mezhdurechensky District, Vologda Oblast, Russia. The population was 1 as of 2002.

== Geography ==
Penyevo is located 28 km southwest of Shuyskoye (the district's administrative centre) by road. Svyatogorye is the nearest rural locality.
