= Selishcha, Mezhdurechensky District, Vologda Oblast =

Selishcha Селища
- Village
- Location within Vologda Oblast Location within Russia
- Coordinates: 59°28′N 41°45′E
- Country: Russia
- Region: Vologda Oblast
- District: Mezhdurechensky District
- Time zone: UTC+3:00

Selishcha (Russian: Селища) is a rural locality (a village) in Turovetskoye Rural Settlement, Mezhdurechensky District, Vologda Oblast, Russia. The population was 2 as of 2002.

== Geography ==
Selishcha is located 263 km northeast of Shuyskoye (the district's administrative centre) by road. Kozhukhovo is the nearest rural locality.
