= Lavrentyevo, Mezhdurechensky District, Vologda Oblast =

Lavrentyevo Лаврентьево
- Village
- Location within Vologda Oblast Location within Russia
- Coordinates: 59°12′N 40°36′E
- Country: Russia
- Region: Vologda Oblast
- District: Mezhdurechensky District
- Time zone: UTC+3:00

Lavrentyevo (Russian: Лаврентьево) is a rural locality (a village) in Botanovskoye Rural Settlement, Mezhdurechensky District, Vologda Oblast, Russia. The population was 20 as of 2002.

== Geography ==
Lavrentyevo is located 36 km southwest of Shuyskoye (the district's administrative centre) by road. Pustoshnovo is the nearest rural locality.
