= Voltash =

Voltash Волташ
- Village
- Location within Vologda Oblast Location within Russia
- Coordinates: 59°24′N 41°25′E
- Country: Russia
- Region: Vologda Oblast
- District: Mezhdurechensky District
- Time zone: UTC+3:00

Voltash (Russian: Волташ) is a rural locality (a village) in Sukhonskoye Rural Settlement, Mezhdurechensky District, Vologda Oblast, Russia. The population was 7 as of 2002.

== Geography ==
Voltash is located 38 km northeast of Shuyskoye (the district's administrative centre) by road. Verkhny Pochinok is the nearest rural locality.
