= Shikhmino =

Shikhmino Шихмино
- Village
- Location within Vologda Oblast Location within Russia
- Coordinates: 59°18′N 40°52′E
- Country: Russia
- Region: Vologda Oblast
- District: Mezhdurechensky District
- Time zone: UTC+3:00

Shikhmino (Russian: Шихмино) is a rural locality (a village) in Sukhonskoye Rural Settlement, Mezhdurechensky District, Vologda Oblast, Russia. The population was 4 as of 2002.

== Geography ==
Shikhmino is located 14 km southwest of Shuyskoye (the district's administrative centre) by road. Popovskoye is the nearest rural locality.
