= Zmeytsyno =

Zmeytsyno Змейцыно
- Village
- Location within Vologda Oblast Location within Russia
- Coordinates: 59°16′N 40°39′E
- Country: Russia
- Region: Vologda Oblast
- District: Mezhdurechensky District
- Time zone: UTC+3:00

Zmeytsyno (Russian: Змейцыно) is a rural locality (a village) in Staroselskoye Rural Settlement, Mezhdurechensky District, Vologda Oblast, Russia. The population was 58 as of 2002.

== Geography ==
Zmeytsyno is located 29 km southwest of Shuyskoye (the district's administrative centre) by road. Staroye is the nearest rural locality.
