= Yershovo, Mezhdurechensky District, Vologda Oblast =

Yershovo Ершово
- Village
- Location within Vologda Oblast Location within Russia
- Coordinates: 59°10′N 40°35′E
- Country: Russia
- Region: Vologda Oblast
- District: Mezhdurechensky District
- Time zone: UTC+3:00

Yershovo (Russian: Ершово) is a rural locality (a village) in Botanovskoye Rural Settlement, Mezhdurechensky District, Vologda Oblast, Russia. While the population was only 4 in 2002, by the 2021 census Yershovo's population had grown to 3,323.

== Geography ==
Yershovo is located 36 km southwest of Shuyskoye (the district's administrative centre) by road. Ognevo is the nearest rural locality.
