= Ostretsovo, Mezhdurechensky District, Vologda Oblast =

Ostretsovo Острецово
- Village
- Location within Vologda Oblast Location within Russia
- Coordinates: 59°17′N 40°42′E
- Country: Russia
- Region: Vologda Oblast
- District: Mezhdurechensky District
- Time zone: UTC+3:00

Ostretsovo (Russian: Острецово) is a rural locality (a village) in Staroselskoye Rural Settlement, Mezhdurechensky District, Vologda Oblast, Russia. The population was 85 as of 2002.

== Geography ==
Ostretsovo is located 26 km southwest of Shuyskoye (the district's administrative centre) by road. Artemyevo is the nearest rural locality.
