= Plemyannikovo =

Plemyannikovo Племянниково
- Village
- Location within Vologda Oblast Location within Russia
- Coordinates: 59°15′N 41°03′E
- Country: Russia
- Region: Vologda Oblast
- District: Mezhdurechensky District
- Time zone: UTC+3:00

Plemyannikovo (Russian: Племянниково) is a rural locality (a village) in Sukhonskoye Rural Settlement, Mezhdurechensky District, Vologda Oblast, Russia. The population was 2 as of 2002.

== Geography ==
Plemyannikovo is located 15 km south of Shuyskoye (the district's administrative centre) by road. Aksentovo is the nearest rural locality.
