= Malaya Storona =

Malaya Storona Малая Сторона
- Village
- Location within Vologda Oblast Location within Russia
- Coordinates: 59°22′N 41°02′E
- Country: Russia
- Region: Vologda Oblast
- District: Mezhdurechensky District
- Time zone: UTC+3:00

Malaya Storona (Russian: Малая Сторона) is a rural locality (a village) in Sukhonskoye Rural Settlement, Mezhdurechensky District, Vologda Oblast, Russia. The population was 58 as of 2002. There are 2 streets.

== Geography ==
Malaya Storona is located 4 km northeast of Shuyskoye (the district's administrative centre) by road. Shuyskoye is the nearest rural locality.
