= Vysokovo, Mezhdurechensky District, Vologda Oblast =

Vysokovo Высоково
- Village
- Location within Vologda Oblast Location within Russia
- Coordinates: 59°13′N 40°47′E
- Country: Russia
- Region: Vologda Oblast
- District: Mezhdurechensky District
- Time zone: UTC+3:00

Vysokovo (Russian: Высоково) is a rural locality (a village) in Staroselskoye Rural Settlement, Mezhdurechensky District, Vologda Oblast, Russia. The population was 1 as of 2002.

== Geography ==
Vysokovo is located 24 km southwest of Shuyskoye (the district's administrative centre) by road. Podgornovo is the nearest rural locality.
