= Yekimovo, Vologda Oblast =

Yekimovo Екимково
- Village
- Location within Vologda Oblast Location within Russia
- Coordinates: 59°08′N 41°00′E
- Country: Russia
- Region: Vologda Oblast
- District: Mezhdurechensky District
- Time zone: UTC+3:00

Yekimovo (Russian: Екимково) is a rural locality (a village) in Botanovskoye Rural Settlement, Mezhdurechensky District, Vologda Oblast, Russia. The population was 1 as of 2002.

== Geography ==
Yekimovo is located 43 km southwest of Shuyskoye (the district's administrative centre) by road. Ivankovo is the nearest rural locality.
