= Parfenka =

Parfenka Парфенка
- Village
- Location within Vologda Oblast Location within Russia
- Coordinates: 59°17′N 40°53′E
- Country: Russia
- Region: Vologda Oblast
- District: Mezhdurechensky District
- Time zone: UTC+3:00

Parfenka (Russian: Парфенка) is a rural locality (a village) in Sukhonskoye Rural Settlement, Mezhdurechensky District, Vologda Oblast, Russia. The population was 7 as of 2002.

== Geography ==
Parfenka is located 12 km southwest of Shuyskoye (the district's administrative centre) by road. Pionersky is the nearest rural locality.
