= Namestovo, Vologda Oblast =

Namestovo Наместово
- Village
- Location within Vologda Oblast Location within Russia
- Coordinates: 59°08′N 40°51′E
- Country: Russia
- Region: Vologda Oblast
- District: Mezhdurechensky District
- Time zone: UTC+3:00

Namestovo (Russian: Наместово) is a rural locality (a village) in Botanovskoye Rural Settlement, Mezhdurechensky District, Vologda Oblast, Russia. The population was 52 as of 2002. There are 3 streets.

== Geography ==
Namestovo is located 38 km southwest of Shuyskoye (the district's administrative centre) by road. Khozhayevo is the nearest rural locality.
