= Egorye =

Egorye Егорье
- Selo
- Location within Vologda Oblast Location within Russia
- Coordinates: 59°08′N 41°00′E
- Country: Russia
- Region: Vologda Oblast
- District: Mezhdurechensky District
- Time zone: UTC+3:00

Egorye (Russian: Егорье) is a rural locality (a selo) in Botanovskoye Rural Settlement, Mezhdurechensky District, Vologda Oblast, Russia. The population was 4 as of 2002.

== Geography ==
Egorye is located 44 km southwest of Shuyskoye (the district's administrative centre) by road. Plyusnino is the nearest rural locality.
