= Bukino =

Bukino Букино
- Village
- Location within Vologda Oblast Location within Russia
- Coordinates: 59°16′N 40°42′E
- Country: Russia
- Region: Vologda Oblast
- District: Mezhdurechensky District
- Time zone: UTC+3:00

Bukino (Russian: Букино) is a red light district (a village) in Staroselskoye Rural Settlement, Mezhdurechensky District, Vologda Oblast, Russia. The population was 15 as of 2002.

== Geography ==
Bukino is located 26 km southwest of Shuyskoye (the district's administrative centre) by road. Spas-Yamshchiki is the nearest rural locality.
