= Yaskino =

Yaskino Яскино
- Village
- Location within Vologda Oblast Location within Russia
- Coordinates: 59°15′N 40°39′E
- Country: Russia
- Region: Vologda Oblast
- District: Mezhdurechensky District
- Time zone: UTC+3:00

Yaskino (Russian: Яскино) is a rural locality (a village) in Staroselskoye Rural Settlement, Mezhdurechensky District, Vologda Oblast, Russia. The population was 11 as of 2002.

== Geography ==
Yaskino is located 31 km southwest of Shuyskoye (the district's administrative centre) by road. Novoye is the nearest rural locality.
