= Svyatogorye =

Svyatogorye Святогорье
- Selo
- Location within Vologda Oblast Location within Russia
- Coordinates: 59°13′N 40°46′E
- Country: Russia
- Region: Vologda Oblast
- District: Mezhdurechensky District
- Time zone: UTC+3:00

Svyatogorye (Russian: Святогорье) is a rural locality (a selo) in Staroselskoye Rural Settlement, Mezhdurechensky District, Vologda Oblast, Russia. The population was 99 as of 2002. There are 4 streets.

== Geography ==
Svyatogorye is located 24 km southwest of Shuyskoye (the district's administrative centre) by road. Vysokovo is the nearest rural locality.
