= Pazukhino =

Pazukhino Пазухино
- Village
- Location within Vologda Oblast Location within Russia
- Coordinates: 59°11′N 40°41′E
- Country: Russia
- Region: Vologda Oblast
- District: Mezhdurechensky District
- Time zone: UTC+3:00

Pazukhino (Russian: Пазухино) is a rural locality (a village) in Botanovskoye Rural Settlement, Mezhdurechensky District, Vologda Oblast, Russia. The population was 4 as of 2002.

== Geography ==
Pazukhino is located 31 km southwest of Shuyskoye (the district's administrative centre) by road. Novosyolka is the nearest rural locality.
