= Dorovatka =

Dorovatka Дороватка
- Village
- Location within Vologda Oblast Location within Russia
- Coordinates: 59°25′N 41°31′E
- Country: Russia
- Region: Vologda Oblast
- District: Mezhdurechensky District
- Time zone: UTC+3:00

Dorovatka (Russian: Дороватка) is a rural locality (a village) in Turovetskoye Rural Settlement, Mezhdurechensky District, Vologda Oblast, Russia. The population was 2 as of 2002.

== Geography ==
Dorovatka is located 258 km northeast of Shuyskoye (the district's administrative centre) by road. Nizhny Pochinok is the nearest rural locality.
