= Nizhny Pochinok, Mezhdurechensky District, Vologda Oblast =

Nizhny Pochinok Нижний Починок
- Village
- Location within Vologda Oblast Location within Russia
- Coordinates: 59°24′N 41°32′E
- Country: Russia
- Region: Vologda Oblast
- District: Mezhdurechensky District
- Time zone: UTC+3:00

Nizhny Pochinok (Russian: Нижний Починок) is a rural locality (a village) in Turovetskoye Rural Settlement, Mezhdurechensky District, Vologda Oblast, Russia. The population was 4 as of 2002.

== Geography ==
Nizhny Pochinok is located 258 km northeast of Shuyskoye (the district's administrative centre) by road. Dorovatka is the nearest rural locality.
