= Kadasovo =

Kadasovo Кадасово
- Village
- Location within Vologda Oblast Location within Russia
- Coordinates: 59°19′N 40°54′E
- Country: Russia
- Region: Vologda Oblast
- District: Mezhdurechensky District
- Time zone: UTC+3:00

Kadasovo (Russian: Кадасово) is a rural locality (a village) in Sukhonskoye Rural Settlement, Mezhdurechensky District, Vologda Oblast, Russia. The population was 2 as of 2002.

== Geography ==
Kadasovo is located 15 km southwest of Shuyskoye (the district's administrative centre) by road. Kopylovo is the nearest rural locality.
