= Yusovo =

Yusovo Юсово
- Village
- Location within Vologda Oblast Location within Russia
- Coordinates: 59°14′N 40°53′E
- Country: Russia
- Region: Vologda Oblast
- District: Mezhdurechensky District
- Time zone: UTC+3:00

Yusovo (Russian: Юсово) is a rural locality (a village) in Sheybukhtovskoye Rural Settlement, Mezhdurechensky District, Vologda Oblast, Russia. The population was 4 as of 2002.

== Geography ==
Yusovo is located 20 km southwest of Shuyskoye (the district's administrative centre) by road. Turybanino is the nearest rural locality.
