= Poplevino =

Poplevino Поплевино
- Village
- Location within Vologda Oblast Location within Russia
- Coordinates: 59°19′N 40°48′E
- Country: Russia
- Region: Vologda Oblast
- District: Mezhdurechensky District
- Time zone: UTC+3:00

Poplevino (Russian: Поплевино) is a rural locality (a village) in Staroselskoye Rural Settlement, Mezhdurechensky District, Vologda Oblast, Russia. The population was 8 as of 2002.

== Geography ==
Poplevino is located 17 km southwest of Shuyskoye (the district's administrative centre) by road. Obroshino is the nearest rural locality.
