= Dvinitsa =

Dvinitsa Двиница
- Settlement
- Location within Vologda Oblast Location within Russia
- Coordinates: 59°25′N 40°52′E
- Country: Russia
- Region: Vologda Oblast
- District: Mezhdurechensky District
- Time zone: UTC+3:00

Dvinitsa (Russian: Двиница) is a rural locality (a settlement) in Sukhonskoye Rural Settlement, Mezhdurechensky District, Vologda Oblast, Russia. The population was 9 as of 2002.

== Geography ==
Dvinitsa is located 14 km northwest of Shuyskoye (the district's administrative centre) by road. Malaya Storona is the nearest rural locality.
