= Shchipino, Mezhdurechensky District, Vologda Oblast =

Shchipino Щипино
- Village
- Location within Vologda Oblast Location within Russia
- Coordinates: 59°17′N 41°05′E
- Country: Russia
- Region: Vologda Oblast
- District: Mezhdurechensky District
- Time zone: UTC+3:00

Shchipino (Russian: Щипино) is a rural locality (a village) in Sukhonskoye Rural Settlement, Mezhdurechensky District, Vologda Oblast, Russia. The population was 31 as of 2002.

== Geography ==
Shchipino is located 12 km southeast of Shuyskoye (the district's administrative centre) by road. Peshkovo is the nearest rural locality.
