= Shichenga =

Shichenga Шиченга
- Settlement
- Location within Vologda Oblast Location within Russia
- Coordinates: 59°18′N 41°05′E
- Country: Russia
- Region: Vologda Oblast
- District: Mezhdurechensky District
- Time zone: UTC+3:00

Shichenga (Russian: Шиченга) is a rural locality (a settlement) in Sukhonskoye Rural Settlement, Mezhdurechensky District, Vologda Oblast, Russia. The population was 228 as of 2002. There are 10 streets.

== Geography ==
Shichenga is located 3 km east of Shuyskoye (the district's administrative centre) by road. Malaya Storona is the nearest rural locality.
