= Krapivino, Mezhdurechensky District, Vologda Oblast =

Krapivino Крапивино
- Village
- Location within Vologda Oblast Location within Russia
- Coordinates: 59°18′N 41°05′E
- Country: Russia
- Region: Vologda Oblast
- District: Mezhdurechensky District
- Time zone: UTC+3:00

Krapivino (Russian: Крапивино) is a rural locality (a village) in Sukhonskoye Rural Settlement, Mezhdurechensky District, Vologda Oblast, Russia. The population was 14 as of 2002.

== Geography ==
Krapivino is located 9 km southeast of Shuyskoye (the district's administrative centre) by road. Kalitino is the nearest rural locality.
