= Mytnitsa =

Mytnitsa Мытница
- Village
- Location within Vologda Oblast Location within Russia
- Coordinates: 59°19′N 40°39′E
- Country: Russia
- Region: Vologda Oblast
- District: Mezhdurechensky District
- Time zone: UTC+3:00

Mytnitsa (Russian: Мытница) is a rural locality (a village) in Staroselskoye Rural Settlement, Mezhdurechensky District, Vologda Oblast, Russia. The population was 2 as of 2002.

== Geography ==
Mytnitsa is located 32 km southwest of Shuyskoye (the district's administrative centre) by road. Pristan Isady is the nearest rural locality.
