= Shikhovo, Mezhdurechensky District, Vologda Oblast =

Shikhovo Шихово
- Village
- Location within Vologda Oblast Location within Russia
- Coordinates: 59°13′N 40°39′E
- Country: Russia
- Region: Vologda Oblast
- District: Mezhdurechensky District
- Time zone: UTC+3:00

Shikhovo (Russian: Шихово) is a rural locality (a village) in Botanovskoye Rural Settlement, Mezhdurechensky District, Vologda Oblast, Russia. The population was 3 as of 2002.

== Geography ==
Shikhovo is located 34 km southwest of Shuyskoye (the district's administrative centre) by road. Kuzminskoye is the nearest rural locality.
