= Matveytsevo =

Matveytsevo Матвейцево
- Village
- Location within Vologda Oblast Location within Russia
- Coordinates: 59°19′N 41°02′E
- Country: Russia
- Region: Vologda Oblast
- District: Mezhdurechensky District
- Time zone: UTC+3:00

Matveytsevo (Russian: Матвейцево) is a rural locality (a village) in Sukhonskoye Rural Settlement, Mezhdurechensky District, Vologda Oblast, Russia. The population was 21 as of 2002.

== Geography ==
Matveytsevo is located 6 km south of Shuyskoye (the district's administrative centre) by road. Podkurnovo is the nearest rural locality.
