= Kosmovo =

Kosmovo Космово
- Village
- Location within Vologda Oblast Location within Russia
- Coordinates: 59°21′N 40°59′E
- Country: Russia
- Region: Vologda Oblast
- District: Mezhdurechensky District
- Time zone: UTC+3:00

Kosmovo (Russian: Космово) is a rural locality (a village) in Sukhonskoye Rural Settlement, Mezhdurechensky District, Vologda Oblast, Russia. The population was 44 as of 2002. There are 3 streets.

== Geography ==
Kosmovo is located 3 km southwest of Shuyskoye (the district's administrative centre) by road. Kosmovo is the nearest rural locality.
