= Ishkovo =

Ishkovo Ишково
- Village
- Location within Vologda Oblast Location within Russia
- Coordinates: 59°21′N 40°57′E
- Country: Russia
- Region: Vologda Oblast
- District: Mezhdurechensky District
- Time zone: UTC+3:00

Ishkovo (Russian: Ишково) is a rural locality (a village) in Sukhonskoye Rural Settlement, Mezhdurechensky District, Vologda Oblast, Russia. The population was 8 as of 2002.

== Geography ==
Ishkovo is located 5 km southwest of Shuyskoye (the district's administrative centre) by road. Pankovo is the nearest rural locality.
