= Kotsyno =

Kotsyno Коцыно
- Village
- Location within Vologda Oblast Location within Russia
- Coordinates: 59°15′N 40°53′E
- Country: Russia
- Region: Vologda Oblast
- District: Mezhdurechensky District
- Time zone: UTC+3:00

Kotsyno (Russian: Коцыно) is a rural locality (a village) in Sheybukhtovskoye Rural Settlement, Mezhdurechensky District, Vologda Oblast, Russia. The population was 5 as of 2002.

== Geography ==
Kotsyno is located 18 km southwest of Shuyskoye (the district's administrative centre) by road. Antropyevo is the nearest rural locality.
