= Makarovo, Mezhdurechensky District, Vologda Oblast =

Makarovo Макарово
- Village
- Location within Vologda Oblast Location within Russia
- Coordinates: 59°12′N 41°02′E
- Country: Russia
- Region: Vologda Oblast
- District: Mezhdurechensky District
- Time zone: UTC+3:00

Makarovo (Russian: Макарово) is a rural locality (a village) in Sheybukhtovskoye Rural Settlement, Mezhdurechensky District, Vologda Oblast, Russia. The population was 3 as of 2002.

== Geography ==
Makarovo is located 29 km south of Shuyskoye (the district's administrative centre) by road. Stanovoye is the nearest rural locality.
