= Ivankovo, Mezhdurechensky District, Vologda Oblast =

Ivankovo Иваньково
- Selo
- Location within Vologda Oblast Location within Russia
- Coordinates: 59°08′N 41°00′E
- Country: Russia
- Region: Vologda Oblast
- District: Mezhdurechensky District
- Time zone: UTC+3:00

Ivankovo (Russian: Иваньково) is a rural locality (a selo) in Botanovskoye Rural Settlement, Mezhdurechensky District, Vologda Oblast, Russia. The population was 5 as of 2002.

== Geography ==
Ivankovo is located 43 km southwest of Shuyskoye (the district's administrative centre) by road. Yekimovo is the nearest rural locality.
