= Motyri =

Motyri Мотыри
- Village
- Location within Vologda Oblast Location within Russia
- Coordinates: 59°24′N 41°19′E
- Country: Russia
- Region: Vologda Oblast
- District: Mezhdurechensky District
- Time zone: UTC+3:00

Motyri (Russian: Мотыри) is a rural locality (a village) in Sukhonskoye Rural Settlement, Mezhdurechensky District, Vologda Oblast, Russia. The population was 14 as of 2002. There are 2 streets.

== Geography ==
Motyri is located 30 km northeast of Shuyskoye (the district's administrative centre) by road. Znamenskoye is the nearest rural locality.
