= Karpovskoye, Mezhdurechensky District, Vologda Oblast =

Karpovskoye Карповское
- Village
- Location within Vologda Oblast Location within Russia
- Coordinates: 59°09′N 40°29′E
- Country: Russia
- Region: Vologda Oblast
- District: Mezhdurechensky District
- Time zone: UTC+3:00

Karpovskoye (Russian: Карповское) is a rural locality (a village) in Botanovskoye Rural Settlement, Mezhdurechensky District, Vologda Oblast, Russia. The population was 14 as of 2002.

== Geography ==
Karpovskoye is located 42 km southwest of Shuyskoye (the district's administrative centre) by road. Ognevo is the nearest rural locality.
