= Popovskoye, Mezhdurechensky District, Vologda Oblast =

Popovskoye Поповское
- Village
- Location within Vologda Oblast Location within Russia
- Coordinates: 59°18′N 40°53′E
- Country: Russia
- Region: Vologda Oblast
- District: Mezhdurechensky District
- Time zone: UTC+3:00

Popovskoye (Russian: Поповское) is a rural locality (a village) in Sukhonskoye Rural Settlement, Mezhdurechensky District, Vologda Oblast, Russia. The population was 47 as of 2002. There are 2 streets.

== Geography ==
Popovskoye is located 13 km southwest of Shuyskoye (the district's administrative centre) by road. Shikhmino is the nearest rural locality.
