= Spas-Yamshchiki =

Spas-Yamshchiki Спас-Ямщики
- Selo
- Location within Vologda Oblast Location within Russia
- Coordinates: 59°16′N 40°42′E
- Country: Russia
- Region: Vologda Oblast
- District: Mezhdurechensky District
- Time zone: UTC+3:00

Spas-Yamshchiki (Russian: Спас-Ямщики) is a rural locality (a selo) in Staroselskoye Rural Settlement, Mezhdurechensky District, Vologda Oblast, Russia. The population was 2 as of 2002. There are 5 streets.

== Geography ==
Spas-Yamshchiki is located 25 km southwest of Shuyskoye (the district's administrative centre) by road. Sovka is the nearest rural locality.
