= Sheybukhta =

Sheybukhta Шейбухта
- Selo
- Location within Vologda Oblast Location within Russia
- Coordinates: 59°15′N 40°55′E
- Country: Russia
- Region: Vologda Oblast
- District: Mezhdurechensky District
- Time zone: UTC+3:00

Sheybukhta (Russian: Шейбухта) is a rural locality (a selo) and the administrative center of Sheybukhtovskoye Rural Settlement, Mezhdurechensky District, Vologda Oblast, Russia. The population was 5 as of 2002. There are 12 streets.

== Geography ==
Sheybukhta is located 21 km southwest of Shuyskoye (the district's administrative centre) by road. Tupitsyno is the nearest rural locality.
