= Brunchakovo =

Brunchakovo Брунчаково
- Village
- Location within Vologda Oblast Location within Russia
- Coordinates: 59°11′N 40°38′E
- Country: Russia
- Region: Vologda Oblast
- District: Mezhdurechensky District
- Time zone: UTC+3:00

Brunchakovo (Russian: Брунчаково) is a rural locality (a village) in Botanovskoye Rural Settlement, Mezhdurechensky District, Vologda Oblast, Russia. The population was 7 as of 2002.

== Geography ==
Brunchakovo is located 32 km southwest of Shuyskoye (the district's administrative centre) by road. Pustoshnovo is the nearest rural locality.
