= Staroye =

Staroye Старое
- Selo
- Location within Vologda Oblast Location within Russia
- Coordinates: 59°16′N 40°39′E
- Country: Russia
- Region: Vologda Oblast
- District: Mezhdurechensky District
- Time zone: UTC+3:00

Staroye (Russian: Старое) is a rural locality (a selo) and the administrative center of Staroselskoye Rural Settlement, Mezhdurechensky District, Vologda Oblast, Russia. The population was 483 as of 2002. There are 10 streets.

== Geography ==
Staroye is located 30 km southwest of Shuyskoye (the district's administrative centre) by road. Zmeytsyno is the nearest rural locality.
