= Uvarovitsa =

Uvarovitsa Уваровица
- Village
- Location within Vologda Oblast Location within Russia
- Coordinates: 59°31′N 41°53′E
- Country: Russia
- Region: Vologda Oblast
- District: Mezhdurechensky District
- Time zone: UTC+3:00

Uvarovitsa (Russian: Уваровица) is a rural locality (a village) in Turovetskoye Rural Settlement, Mezhdurechensky District, Vologda Oblast, Russia. The population was 9 as of 2002.

== Geography ==
Uvarovitsa is located 250 km northeast of Shuyskoye (the district's administrative centre) by road. Turovets is the nearest rural locality.
