= Plyusnino =

Plyusnino Плюснино
- Village
- Location within Vologda Oblast Location within Russia
- Coordinates: 59°08′N 41°01′E
- Country: Russia
- Region: Vologda Oblast
- District: Mezhdurechensky District
- Time zone: UTC+3:00

Plyusnino (Russian: Плюснино) is a rural locality (a village) in Botanovskoye Rural Settlement, Mezhdurechensky District, Vologda Oblast, Russia. The population was 11 as of 2002.

== Geography ==
Plyusnino is located 45 km south of Shuyskoye (the district's administrative centre) by road. Yegorye is the nearest rural locality.
