= Ryapalovo =

Ryapalovo Ряпалово
- Village
- Location within Vologda Oblast Location within Russia
- Coordinates: 59°08′N 40°53′E
- Country: Russia
- Region: Vologda Oblast
- District: Mezhdurechensky District
- Time zone: UTC+3:00

Ryapalovo (Russian: Ряпалово) is a rural locality (a village) in Botanovskoye Rural Settlement, Mezhdurechensky District, Vologda Oblast, Russia. The population was 3 as of 2002.

== Geography ==
Ryapalovo is located 35 km southwest of Shuyskoye (the district's administrative centre) by road. Gavrilkovo is the nearest rural locality.
