= Molochnoye =

Molochnoye Молочное
- Selo
- Location within Vologda Oblast Location within Russia
- Coordinates: 59°17′N 39°40′E
- Country: Russia
- Region: Vologda Oblast
- District: Vologda
- Time zone: UTC+3:00

Molochnoye (Russian: Моло́чное) is a rural locality (a selo) in Vologda, Vologda Oblast, Russia. The population was 7,690 as of 2017. There are 22 streets.

== Geography ==
Molochnoye is located on the left bank of the Vologda River,7 km northwest of Vologda (the district's administrative centre) by road. Ilyinskoye ,Yagody is the nearest rural locality.
