= Uftyuga =

Uftyuga may refer to several rivers in Northern Russia:

- Uftyuga (Northern Dvina), a tributary of the Northern Dvina in Arkhangelsk Oblast
- Uftyuga (Sukhona), a tributary of the Sukhona in Vologda Oblast
- Uftyuga (Kokshenga), a tributary of the Kokshenga in Vologda Oblast
- Uftyuga (Lake Kubenskoye), a tributary of Lake Kubenskoye in Vologda Oblast
