= Mikhalitsa =

River in Vologda Oblast, Russia

Coordinates: 59.7597°N 42.8519°E

Mikhalitsa (Russian: Михалица) is a river in Totemsky District, Vologda Oblast, Russia. It is a right tributary of Pechenzhitsa, a right tributary of Sukhona. Its length is 16 km.
