= Gryazovetsky =

Gryazovetsky (masculine), Gryazovetskaya (feminine), or Gryazovetskoye (neuter) may refer to:

- Gryazovetsky District, a district of Vologda Oblast, Russia
- Gryazovetsky Uyezd (1780–1924), an administrative division in the Russian Empire and the early Russian SFSR; most recently (1796–1924) a part of Vologda Governorate
- Gryazovetskoye Urban Settlement, a municipal formation which the town of district significance of Gryazovets and two rural localities in Gryazovetsky District of Vologda Oblast, Russia are incorporated as
