= Vokhtoga =

Vokhtoga Вохтога
- Urban-type settlement
- Interactive map of Vokhtoga
- Location of Vokhtoga Vokhtoga (Vologda Oblast)
- Coordinates: 58°48′N 41°02′E
- Country: Russia
- Federal subject: Vologda Oblast
- Administrative district: Gryazovetsky District
- Founded: 1938

Population (2010 Census)
  - Total: 6,375
  - Estimate (2023): 5,425 (−14.9%)

Municipal status
  - Municipal district: Gryazovetsky Municipal District
  - Urban settlement: Vokhtogskoye Urban Settlement
  - Capital of: Vokhtogskoye Urban Settlement
- Time zone: UTC+3 (MSK)
- Postal code: 162040
- OKTMO ID: 19624160051

Vokhtoga (Russian: Вохтога) is an urban locality (an urban-type settlement) in Gryazovetsky District of Vologda Oblast, Russia. Municipally, it is incorporated as Vokhtogskoye Urban Settlement, one of the two urban settlements in the district. Vokhtoga is located on the right bank of the Lezha River, a right tributary of the Sukhona. Population: 6,375 (2010 census); 7,247 (2002 census); 7,623 (1989 Soviet census).

== History ==
Vokhtoga was founded in 1938 to serve timber production and timber industry and obtained the status of the urban-type settlement in 1960.

== Economy ==
=== Industry ===
Vokhtoga has a number of timber industry enterprises.

=== Transportation ===
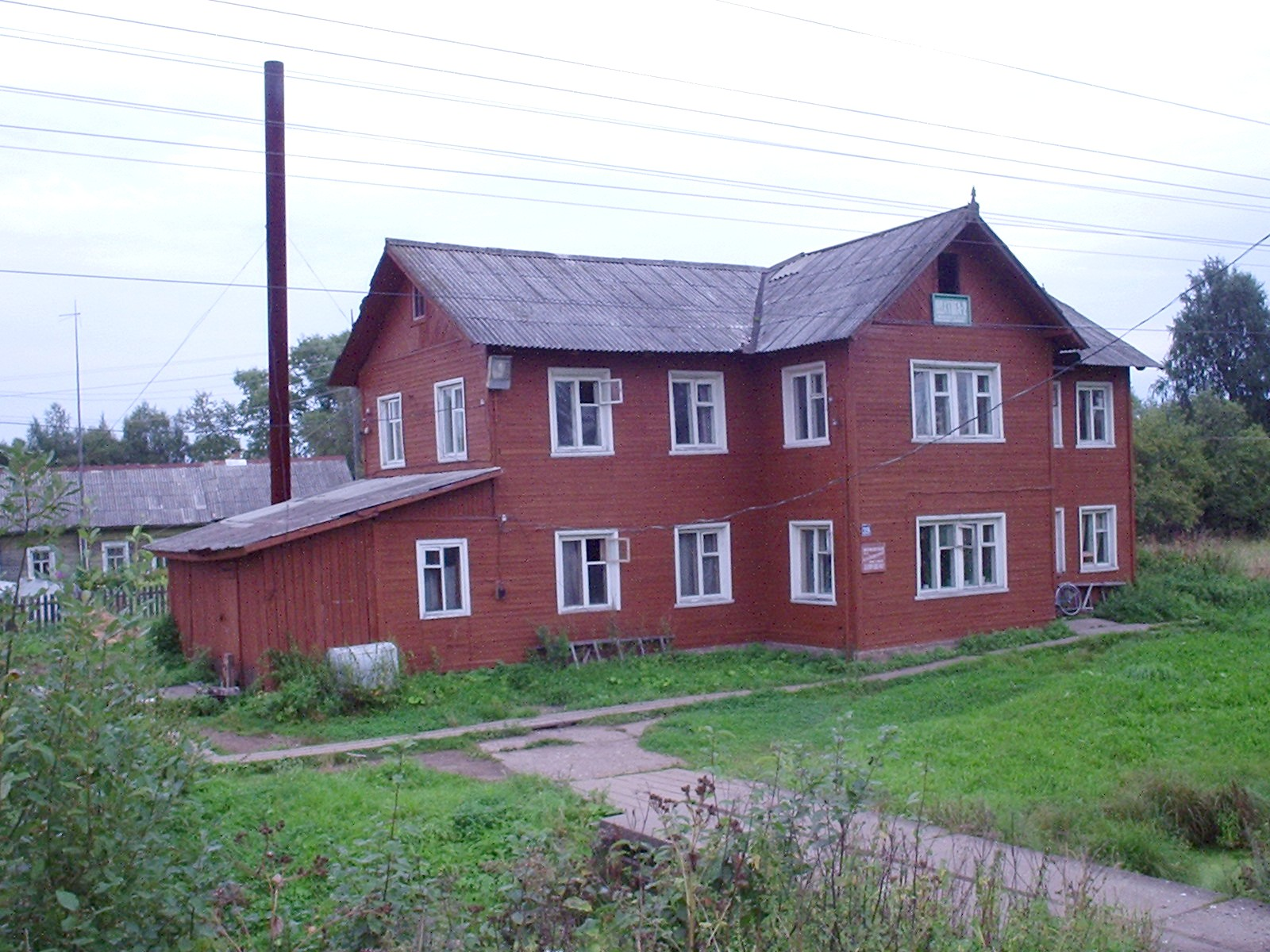
The railway station Vokhtoga-2: The beginning of the Monza Railroad

Vokhtoga has a railway station on the railroad connecting Vologda in the north and Buy in the south. At Vokhtoga, another railroad branches off east, the Monza Railroad, built for timber transport and operated by the timber production authorities, which runs along the border of Vologda and Kostroma Oblasts. The Monza railroad crosses the district and enters Mezhdurechensky District, eventually continuing to the southeastern districts of Vologda Oblast. The plans to extend it further east to Nikolsk were never realized. The Monza Railroad has a separate station in Vokhoga, Vokhtoga-2 railway station. The headquarters of the Monzales company which owns the railroad are located in Vokhtoga.
