= Konyukhov =

Konyukhov (Russian: Конюхо́в, from конюх meaning groom) is a Russian masculine surname, its feminine counterpart is Konyukhova. It may refer to:

- Fyodor Konyukhov (born 1951), Russian survivalist and traveller
  - 18301 Konyukhov, a minor planet named after Fyodor
- Tatyana Konyukhova (born 1931), Soviet actress
- Yevgeni Konyukhov (born 1986), Russian football player

== See also ==
- Konyukhovo (disambiguation), rural localities named "Konyukhovo"
