= Pechenzhitsa =

River in Vologda Oblast, Russia

Coordinates: 59°48′53″N 42°39′37″E

Northern Dvina basin; Sukhona is shown

Pechenzhitsa (Russian: Печеньжица) is a river in Vologda Oblast, Russia. It is part of the Northern Dvina basin and is a right tributary of Sukhona river and flows through the Babushkinsky and Totemsky Districts of the oblast into Sukhona 298km from its mouth. Its largest tributary is Mikhalitsa.

The name is the diminutive of the toponym Печеньга (not to be confused with Pechenga, Печенга) and is part of the Finnic substrate of the toponymy of Northern Russia.
