= Dvinitsa (river) =

Dvinitsa Russian: Двиница
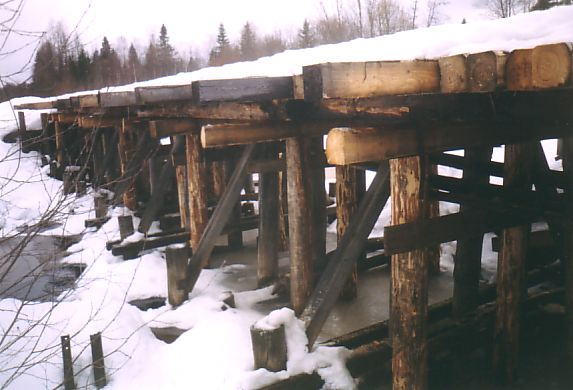

Location
- Country: Russia

Physical characteristics
- Mouth: Sukhona
  - coordinates: 59°25′28″N 40°53′37″E
  - elevation: 105 metres (344 ft)
- Length: 174 km (108 mi)
- Basin size: 2,400 km^{2} (930 sq mi)

Basin features
- Progression: Sukhona→ Northern Dvina→ White Sea

The Dvinitsa (Russian: Двиница) is a river in Kharovsky, Sokolsky, and Mezhdurechensky Districts of Vologda Oblast in Russia. It is a left tributary of the Sukhona. It is 174 kilometres (108 mi) long, and the area of its basin 2,400 square kilometres (930 sq mi). The main tributaries of the Dvinitsa are the Shorega, the Korbanga, and the Votcha (all from the left).

The source of the Dvinitsa is located in the south of Kharovsky District, southeast of the town of Kharovsk. The Dvinitsa flows south, passes Semigorodnyaya railway station, enters Sokolsky District and turns southeast. It crosses the district and, close to the border with Mezhdurechensky District, accepting the Votcha from the left, the Dvinitsa makes a U-turn and flows northeast. At the point it accepts the Bolshoy Nodimets from the right, it sharply turns southeast again. The mouth of the Dvinitsa is in the village of Dvinitsa. The last stretch of the Dvinitsa upstream from the mouth serves as a border between Sokolsky (west) and Mezhdurechensky (east) Districts.

Until the 1990s, the Dvinitsa was used for timber rafting.
