= Lezha (river) =

Lezha Russian: Лежа

Location
- Country: Russia

Physical characteristics
- Mouth: Sukhona
  - coordinates: 59°16′54″N 40°13′10″E
- Length: 178 km (111 mi)
- Basin size: 3,350 km^{2} (1,290 sq mi)
- Discharge
  - average: 10.5 cubic metres per second (370 cu ft/s)

Basin features
- Progression: Sukhona→ Northern Dvina→ White Sea

The Northern Dvina River basin. The Lezha is shown on the map.

Lezha, also known as Olidovka (Russian: Лежа, Олидовка), is a river in Gryazovetsky, Vologodsky, and Mezhdurechensky Districts of Vologda Oblast in Russia. It is a right tributary of the Sukhona. It is 178 kilometres (111 mi) long, and the area of its basin 3,550 square kilometres (1,370 sq mi). The principal tributaries are the Senga (left), the Velikaya (right), and the Komela (left).

The river basin of the Lezha constitutes the southernmost part of the basin of the Northern Dvina and comprises the eastern part of Gryazoversky District, parts of Mezhdurechensky and Vologodsky Districts, and minor areas in the north of Kostroma Oblast. Areas east, south, and west of the Lezha river basin drain to the Volga. The basin of the Lezha includes Lake Nikolskoye, which drains into the Komela.

The source of the Lezha is in the south of Gryazoversky District, at the border with Kostroma Oblast. The river flows in the northwestern direction, crossing the district up to its northern border. The urban-type settlement of Vokhtoga is located on the right bank of the Lezha. The lowest stretch of the Lezha forms the border between Vologodsky and Mezhdurechensky Districts. The mouth of the Lezha is close to the mouth of the Vologda and to the village of Ustye Vologodskoye.

The lowest stretch of the Lezha, 23 kilometres (14 mi) downstream of the village of Lobkovo, is listed in the State Water Register of Russia as navigable, however, there is no passenger navigation.
