= Yangosar =

Yangosar Янгосарь
- Village
- Location within Vologda Oblast Location within Russia
- Coordinates: 59°02′N 39°21′E
- Country: Russia
- Region: Vologda Oblast
- District: Vologodsky District
- Time zone: UTC+3:00

Yangosar (Russian: Янгосарь) is a rural locality (a village) in Staroselskoye Rural Settlement, Vologodsky District, Vologda Oblast, Russia. The population was 31 as of 2002.

== Geography ==
Yangosar is located 44 km southwest of Vologda (the district's administrative centre) by road. Korytovo is the nearest rural locality.
