= Konyukhovo, Vladimir Oblast =

Konyukhovo Конюхово
- Village
- Location within Vladimir Oblast Location within Russia
- Coordinates: 56°27′N 38°26′E
- Country: Russia
- Region: Vladimir Oblast
- District: Alexandrovsky District
- Time zone: UTC+3:00

Konyukhovo (Russian: Конюхо́во) is a rural locality (a village) in Krasnoplamenskoye Rural Settlement, Alexandrovsky District, Vladimir Oblast, Russia. The population was 7 as of 2010. There are 2 streets.

== Geography ==
Konyukhovo is located on the Dubna River, 23 km northwest of Alexandrov (the district's administrative centre) by road. Dubna is the nearest rural locality.
