= Kishkino =

Kishkino Кишкино
- Village
- Location within Vologda Oblast Location within Russia
- Coordinates: 59°09′N 40°02′E
- Country: Russia
- Region: Vologda Oblast
- District: Vologodsky District
- Time zone: UTC+3:00

Kishkino (Russian: Кишкино) is a rural locality (a village) in Podlesnoye Rural Settlement, Vologodsky District, Vologda Oblast, Russia. The population was 2 as of 2002.

== Geography ==
The distance to Vologda is 14 km, to Ogarkovo is 1 km. Ogarkovo, Pogorelovo, Rebrovo, Medovshchikovo, Lazarevo are the nearest rural localities.
