= Kishkintso =

Kishkintso Кишкинцо
- Village
- Location within Vologda Oblast Location within Russia
- Coordinates: 59°06′N 39°59′E
- Country: Russia
- Region: Vologda Oblast
- District: Vologodsky District
- Time zone: UTC+3:00

Kishkintso (Russian: Кишкинцо) is a rural locality (a village) in Podlesnoye Rural Settlement, Vologodsky District, Vologda Oblast, Russia. The population was 3 as of 2002.

== Geography ==
Kishkintso is located 18 km southeast of Vologda (the district's administrative centre) by road. Nevinnikovo is the nearest rural locality.
