= Alexeyevo, Ustyuzhensky District, Vologda Oblast =

Alexeyevo Алексеево
- Village
- Location within Vologda Oblast Location within Russia
- Coordinates: 58°41′N 36°25′E
- Country: Russia
- Region: Vologda Oblast
- District: Ustyuzhensky District
- Time zone: UTC+3:00

Alexeyevo (Russian: Алексеево) is a rural locality (a village) in Nikiforovskoye Rural Settlement, Ustyuzhensky District, Vologda Oblast, Russia. The population was 18 as of 2002.

== Geography ==
Alexeyevo is located 19 km (12 mi) south of Ustyuzhna (the district's administrative centre) by road. Remennikovo is the nearest rural locality.
