= Uftyuga (Sukhona) =

Uftyuga Russian: Уфтюга

Location
- Country: Russia

Physical characteristics
- Mouth: Sukhona
  - coordinates: 60°23′09″N 44°09′28″E
- Length: 134 km (83 mi)
- Basin size: 2,360 km^{2} (910 sq mi)
- Discharge
  - average: 21.8 cubic metres per second (770 cu ft/s)

Basin features
- Progression: Sukhona→ Northern Dvina→ White Sea

The Uftyuga (Russian: Уфтюга) is a river in Ustyansky District of Arkhangelsk Oblast and Tarnogsky and Nyuksensky Districts of Vologda Oblast in Russia. It is a left tributary of the Sukhona. The river is 134 kilometres (83 mi) long. The area of its basin is 2,360 square kilometres (910 sq mi). The main tributaries of the Uftyuga are the Sulonga (right) and the Porsha (left).

The source of the Uftyuga is located north of Sulanda railway station on the railway connecting Konosha and Kotlas, in Arkhangelsk Oblast. The river flows in the eastern direction. In the village and railway station of Uftyuga it turns south and enters Vologda Oblast. Still further south, for approximately 5 kilometres (3.1 mi) it forms the boundary between Tarnogsky and Nyuksensky Districts, accepts the Sulonga from the right and enters Nyuksensky District. Upstream from the village of Zadnyaya, the Uftyuga flows in the woods (taiga), downstream from this village it flows mostly in the fields. The mouth of the Uftyga is in the village of Beryozovaya Slobodka, several kilometers upstream from the selo of Nyuksenitsa.
