= Ogarkovo =

Ogarkovo Огарково
- Settlement
- Location within Vologda Oblast Location within Russia
- Coordinates: 59°08′N 40°02′E
- Country: Russia
- Region: Vologda Oblast
- District: Vologodsky District
- Time zone: UTC+3:00

Ogarkovo (Russian: Огарково) is a rural locality (a settlement) and the administrative center of Podlesnoye Rural Settlement, Vologodsky District, Vologda Oblast, Russia. The population was 1,400 as of 2002. There are 7 streets within this locality.

== Geography ==
Ogarkovo is located 13 km southeast of Vologda (the district's administrative centre) by road. Pogorelovo is the nearest rural locality.
