= Alexeyevo, Sheksninsky District, Vologda Oblast =

Alexeyevo Алексеево
- Village
- Location within Vologda Oblast Location within Russia
- Coordinates: 59°21′N 38°22′E
- Country: Russia
- Region: Vologda Oblast
- District: Sheksninsky District
- Time zone: UTC+3:00

Alexeyevo (Russian: Алексеево) is a rural locality (a village) in Yershovskoye Rural Settlement, Sheksninsky District, Vologda Oblast, Russia. The population was 10 as of 2002.

== Geography ==
Alexeyevo is located 26 km (16 mi) north of Sheksna (the district's administrative centre) by road. Gorka is the nearest rural locality.
