= Northern Ridge =

Coordinates: 59°46′35″N 45°23′53″E

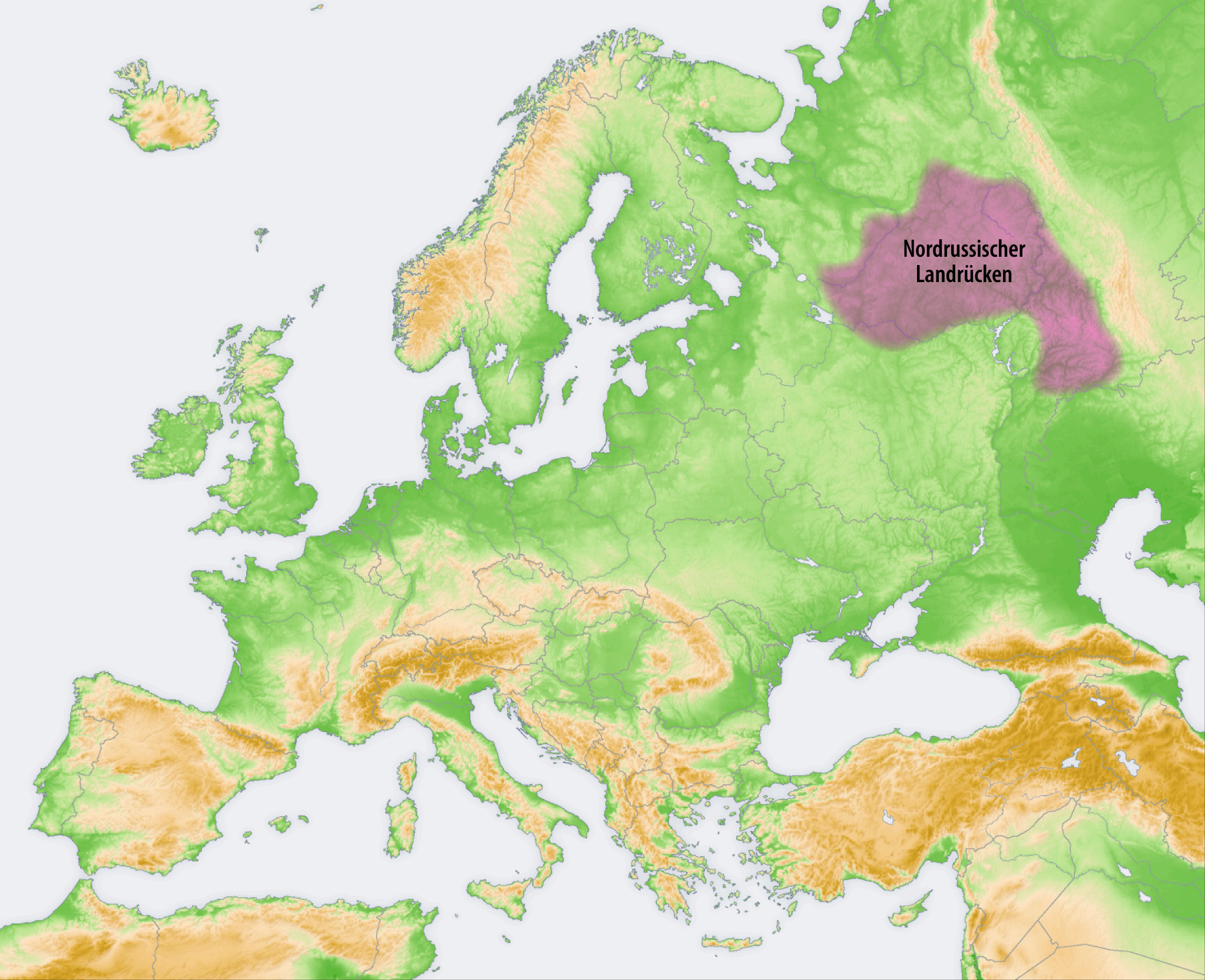
Location of the Northern Ridge (purple) on the topographic map of Europe

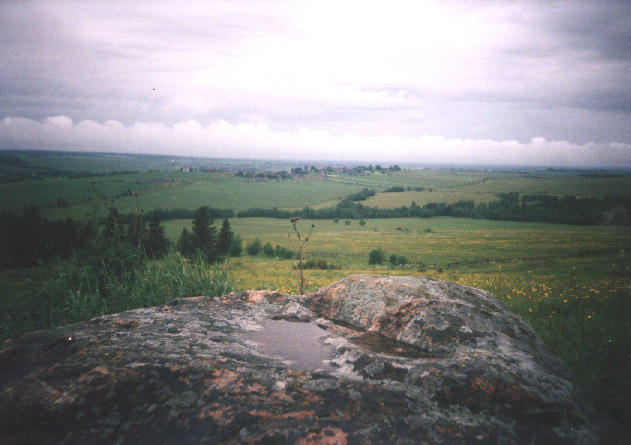
Isakova Gora, the highest point of the ridge

The Northern Ridge, Northern Uvaly, Severnyye Uvaly (Russian: Северные Увалы), is a chain of hills in the northern part of the East European Plain in Russia. The Northern Ridge divides the river basins of the Northern Dvina River (north) and the Volga River (south). The chain is located roughly in the west–east direction, between the source of the Kostroma River and the sources of the Vychegda River and the Kama River. The Northern Ridge is approximately 200 km long. Roughly, the chain is limited from the north by the valleys of the Sukhona and the Vychegda, and from the south by the course of the Volga in the west and by the course of the Kama in the east.

Administratively, the Northern Ridge is located in Kostroma, Vologda, Kirov Oblasts, the Komi Republic, and Perm Krai of Russia.

The landscape of the Northern Ridge originates from the Ice Age and has the glacial nature. The hills were polished by the glacier and currently achieve the height of 293 metres (961 ft) (in Babushkinsky District, Vologda Oblast). The rivers flow in deep ravines. The principal rivers which have their source in the Northern Ridge are the Yug, the Luza, the Unzha, the Sysola, and the Moloma.
