= Konyukhovo, Ustyuzhensky District, Vologda Oblast =

Konyukhovo Конюхово
- Village
- Location within Vologda Oblast Location within Russia
- Coordinates: 58°37′N 36°30′E
- Country: Russia
- Region: Vologda Oblast
- District: Ustyuzhensky District
- Time zone: UTC+3:00

Konyukhovo (Russian: Конюхо́во) is a rural locality (a village) in Nikiforovskoye Rural Settlement, Ustyuzhensky District, Vologda Oblast, Russia. The population was 17 as of 2002.

== Geography ==
Konyukhovo is located 26 km (16 mi) south of Ustyuzhna (the district's administrative centre) by road. Ivanovskoye is the nearest rural locality.
