= Alexeyevo, Vysokovsky Selsoviet, Vologodsky District, Vologda Oblast =

Alexeyevo Алексеево
- Village
- Location within Vologda Oblast Location within Russia
- Coordinates: 59°29′N 39°18′E
- Country: Russia
- Region: Vologda Oblast
- District: Vologodsky District
- Time zone: UTC+3:00

Alexeyevo (Russian: Алексеево) is a rural locality (a village) in Vysokovskoye Rural Settlement, Vologodsky District, Vologda Oblast, Russia. The population was 2 as of 2002.

== Geography ==
Alexeyevo is located 29 km northwest of Vologda (the district's administrative centre) by road. Selyunino is the nearest rural locality.
