= Tupitsyno, Sokolsky District, Vologda Oblast =

Tupitsyno Тупицыно
- Village
- Location within Vologda Oblast Location within Russia
- Coordinates: 59°32′N 39°56′E
- Country: Russia
- Region: Vologda Oblast
- District: Sokolsky District
- Time zone: UTC+3:00

Tupitsyno (Russian: Тупицыно) is a rural locality (a village) in Arkhangelskoye Rural Settlement, Sokolsky District, Vologda Oblast, Russia. The population was 11 as of 2002.

== Geography ==
Tupitsyno is located 15 km northwest of Sokol (the district's administrative centre) by road. Arkhangelskoye is the nearest rural locality.
