= Golenevo =

Golenevo Голенево
- Village
- Location within Vologda Oblast Location within Russia
- Coordinates: 59°06′N 39°55′E
- Country: Russia
- Region: Vologda Oblast
- District: Vologodsky District
- Time zone: UTC+3:00

Golenevo (Russian: Голенево) is a rural locality (a village) in Podlesnoye Rural Settlement, Vologodsky District, Vologda Oblast, Russia. The population was 8 as of 2002. There are 2 streets.

== Geography ==
Golenevo is located 17 km south of Vologda (the district's administrative centre) by road. Loptunovo is the nearest rural locality.
