= Snasudovo =

Snasudovo Снасудово
- Village
- Location within Vologda Oblast Location within Russia
- Coordinates: 59°08′N 40°00′E
- Country: Russia
- Region: Vologda Oblast
- District: Vologodsky District
- Time zone: UTC+3:00

Snasudovo (Russian: Снасудово) is a rural locality (a village) in Podlesnoye Rural Settlement, Vologodsky District, Vologda Oblast, Russia. The population was 91 as of 2002. There are 10 streets.

== Geography ==
Snasudovo is located 13 km southeast of Vologda (the district's administrative centre) by road. Moseykovo is the nearest rural locality.
