= Konyukhi =

Konyukhi Конюхи
- Settlement
- Location within Altai Krai Location within Russia
- Coordinates: 53°10′N 83°42′E
- Country: Russia
- Region: Altai Krai
- District: Barnaul
- Time zone: UTC+7:00

Konyukhi (Russian: Конюхи) is a rural locality (a settlement) in Barnaul, Altai Krai, Russia. The population was 18 as of 2013.

== Geography ==
Konyukhi is located 27 km south of Barnaul by road. Belmesyovo is the nearest rural locality.
