= Mitropolye =

Mitropolye Митрополье
- Village
- Location within Vologda Oblast Location within Russia
- Coordinates: 59°32′N 39°08′E
- Country: Russia
- Region: Vologda Oblast
- District: Vologodsky District
- Time zone: UTC+3:00

Mitropolye (Russian: Митрополье) is a rural locality (a village) in Staroselskoye Rural Settlement, Vologodsky District, Vologda Oblast, Russia. The population was 2 as of 2002.

== Geography ==
Mitropolye is located 74 km northwest of Vologda (the district's administrative centre) by road. Kostromino is the nearest rural locality.
