= Vologda (river) =

Vologda Russian: Вологда
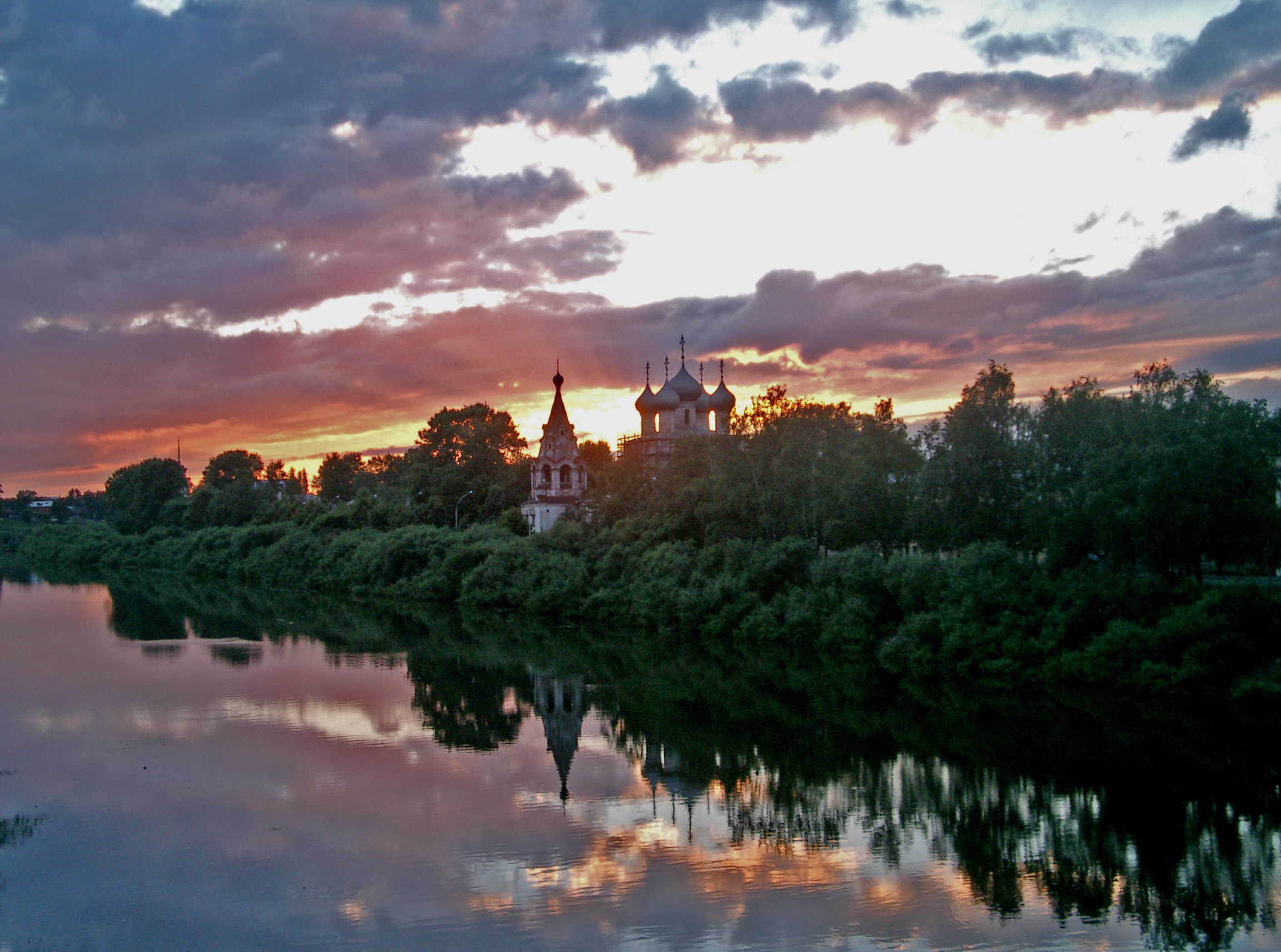
- The Vologda in the center of the city of Vologda

Location
- Country: Russia

Physical characteristics
- Mouth: Sukhona
  - coordinates: 59.2862°N 40.2165°E
- Length: 155 km (96 mi)
- Basin size: 3,030 km^{2} (1,170 sq mi)

Basin features
- Progression: Sukhona→ Northern Dvina→ White Sea

The Northern Dvina basin. The Vologda is shown on the map.

The Vologda (Russian: Вологда) is a river in Sheksninsky and Vologodsky Districts of Vologda Oblast as well as in the city of Vologda in Russia. A right-tributary of the Sukhona, it is 155 kilometres (96 mi) long, and the area of its basin 3,030 square kilometres (1,170 sq mi). The principal tributary is the Toshnya (right). The river takes its name from the city of Vologda, which is located on the river Vologda.

According to Max Vasmer's Etymological Dictionary, the name "Vologda" originates from a Uralic language and means "a white city". Another, less reliable account suggests that the city was named after the river and its name should be translated as "white water" (compare Eastern Mari volgədo "light"). Folk-etymology sometimes associates the name Vologda with the Russian word volok (Russian: волок) meaning "portage" or "stretch of forest".

The source of the Vologda lies in the western part of Vologodsky District. The river flows north, enters Sheksninsky District for several kilometers, returns to Vologodsky District and turns southwest. The valley of the Vologda is heavily populated. Upstream of the city of Vologda, the river accepts the Toshnya from the right and turns east, flowing through the city of Vologda. East of Vologda, the river flows northeast past unpopulated swampy areas and joins the Sukhona in the village of Ustye-Vologodskoye.

The river basin of the Vologda comprises the major part of Vologodsky District, as well as minor areas of Sheksninsky and Gryazovetsky Districts of Vologda Oblast. It belongs to the basins of the Northern Dvina and of the White Sea.

The Vologda is navigable from its confluence with the Toshnya River, however, there is no passenger navigation.
