= Sukhona =

River in the European part of Russia

Sukhona Russian: Сухона
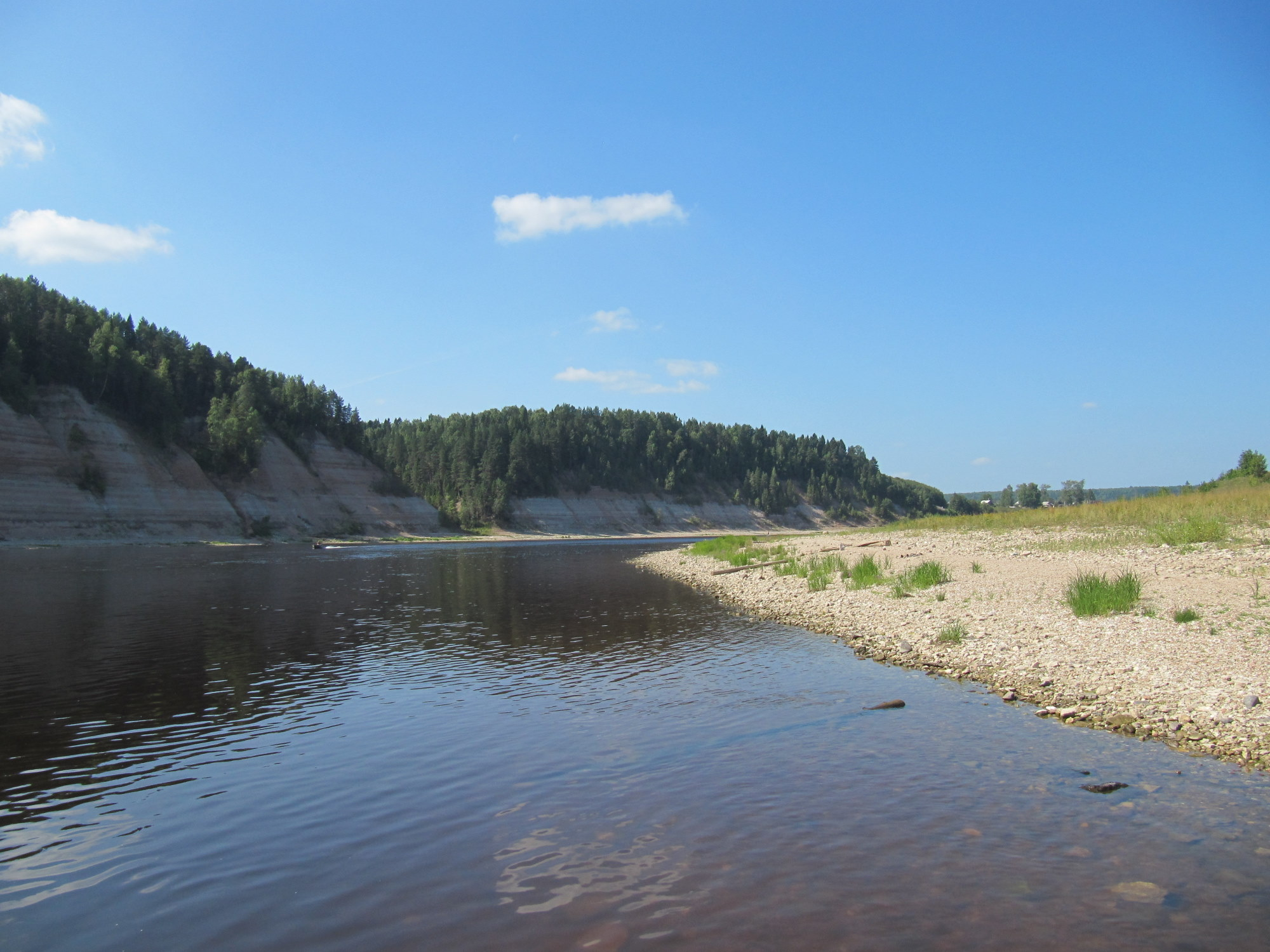
- The Sukhona in the locality of Opoki

Location
- Country: Russia

Physical characteristics
- Mouth: Northern Dvina
  - coordinates: 60°43′58″N 46°19′41″E
- Length: 558 km (347 mi)
- Basin size: 50,300 km^{2} (19,400 sq mi)
- Discharge
  - average: 456 cubic metres per second (16,100 cu ft/s)

Basin features
- Progression: Northern Dvina→ White Sea

Map of the Northern Dvina basin. The Sukhona is shown on the map.

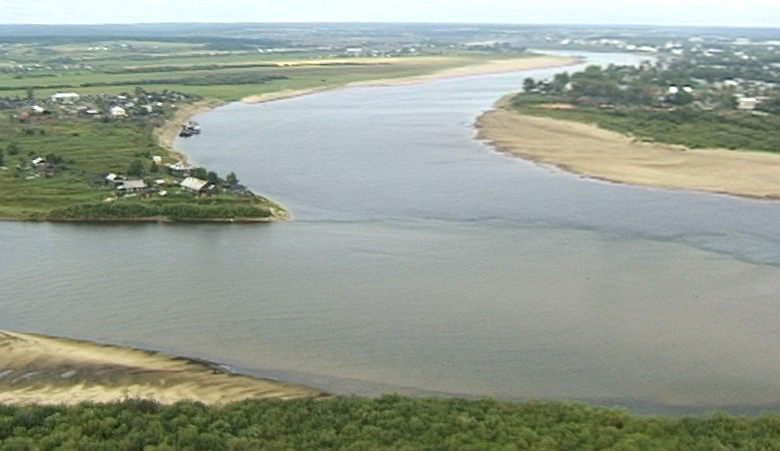
The Northern Dvina starts as the confluence of the Yug (left) and the Sukhona (top) in the town of Veliky Ustyug

The Sukhona (Russian: Су́хона) is a river in the European part of Russia, a tributary of the Northern Dvina. The course of the Sukhona lies in Ust-Kubinsky, Sokolsky, Mezhdurechensky, Totemsky, Tarnogsky, Nyuksensky, and Velikoustyugsky Districts of Vologda Oblast in Russia. It is 558 kilometres (347 mi) long, and the area of its basin 50,300 square kilometres (19,400 sq mi). The Sukhona joins the Yug near the town of Veliky Ustyug, forming the Northern Dvina, one of the biggest rivers of European Russia.

The biggest tributaries of the Sukhona are the Vologda (right), the Lezha (right), the Pelshma (left), the Dvinitsa (left), the Tolshma (right), the Tsaryova (left), the Uftyuga (left), and the Gorodishna (right).

== Etymology ==
According to the Max Vasmer's Etymological Dictionary, the name of the river originates from the Russian and most likely means "a river with a dry (hard) bottom".

== Physical geography ==
The river basin of the Sukhona comprises vast areas in the central and eastern parts of Vologda Oblast, in the south of Arkhangelsk Oblast, and in the north of Kostroma Oblast. In particular, the city of Vologda is located in the river basin of the Sukhona. The basin also includes Lake Kubenskoye, one of the biggest lakes in Vologda Oblast. The river basin is bounded from the south by the western part of the Northern Ridge, which separates the basins of the Sukhona and the Kostroma. From the north, the Sukhona river basin is bounded in the western part by the Kharovsk Ridge hill chain which separates it from the river basin of the Vaga.

The towns of Sokol, Totma, and Veliky Ustyug, as well as the villages and district centers Shuyskoye and Nyuksenitsa, are located on the banks of the Sukhona.

The source of the Sukhona is in the south-eastern part of Lake Kubenskoye. The Sukhona flows out in the south-eastern direction, accepts the Vologda and the Lezha from the right and turns northeast. Most of the river course runs over hilly landscape with tall banks. The Sukhona freezes up in late October - November and stays under the ice until late April - early May.

== Tributaries ==
- Major left: Pelshma, Dvinitsa, Strelitsa, Tsareva, Uftyuga, Verkhnyaya Yorga, Nizhnyaya Yorga
- Major right: Vologda, Lezha, Ikhalitsa, Tolshma, Ledenga, Pechenga, Gorodishna, Strelna, Luzhenga
- Other: Pechenzhitsa (right))

== Navigation and canals ==
The Sukhona is navigable, but there is no passenger navigation except for ferry crossings. The lower course of the Kubena and Lake Kubenskoye are navigable as well. The northern part of Lake Kubenskoye, which belongs to the basin of the Sukhona, is connected by Northern Dvina Canal with the town of Kirillov and the Sheksna, thus connecting the basins of the White Sea and the Volga. In the 19th century, the canal and Lake Kubenskoye were the main waterway connecting the Volga with the White Sea. However, in the 1930s the White Sea – Baltic Canal was built, and the Northern Dvina Canal lost its significance. The canal is still in operation, serving cargo traffic and occasional cruise ships, which then proceed to Lake Kubenskoye.

== History ==
The area was populated by Finnic peoples and then colonized by the Novgorod Republic, with the exception was Veliky Ustyug, which was part of Vladimir-Suzdal Principality. Totma has been first mentioned in the chronicles in 1137, and Veliky Ustyug — in 1207. In the 13th century the Novgorod merchants already reached the White Sea. The area was attractive in the first instance because of the fur trading. The main waterway from Novgorod into the Northern Dvina was along the Volga and its tributary, the Sheksna, along the Slavyanka into Lake Nikolskoye, then the boats were taken by land to Lake Blagoveshchenskoye, from there downstream along the Porozovitsa into Lake Kubenskoye and further to the Sukhona and the Northern Dvina.

Until the 1700s, Arkhangelsk was the main trading harbour for the sea trade of Russia and Western Europe, and the Sukhona was on the main trading route connecting the central Russia with Arkhangelsk. Peter the Great drastically changed the situation, by founding Saint-Petersburg in 1703, thus opening the way for the Baltic Sea trade, and by constructing the highway between Saint-Petersburg and Arkhangelsk via Kargopol. The river quickly lost its role as the leading trading route, which was accelerated by the construction of the railway between Vologda and Arkhangelsk between 1894 and 1897.
