= Gryazovetsky Uyezd =

Subdivision of the Vologda Governorate of the Russian Empire

Gryazovetsky Uyezd (Russian: Грязовецкий уезд) was one of the subdivisions of the Vologda Governorate of the Russian Empire. It was situated in the southwestern part of the governorate. Its administrative centre was Gryazovets. In terms of present-day administrative borders, the territory of Gryazovetsky Uyezd is divided between the Gryazovetsky and Mezhdurechensky districts of Vologda Oblast.

== Demographics ==
At the time of the Russian Empire Census of 1897, Gryazovetsky Uyezd had a population of 105,438. Of these, 99.9% spoke Russian as their native language.
