= Shuyskoye, Vologda Oblast =

Shuyskoye Шуйское
- Selo
- Interactive map of Shuyskoye
- Location of Shuyskoye Shuyskoye (Vologda Oblast)
- Coordinates: 59°22′N 41°02′E
- Country: Russia
- Federal subject: Vologda Oblast
- Administrative district: Mezhdurechensky District
- Selsoviet: Ustyansky Selsoviet
- First mention: 1627

Population (2010 Census)
  - Total: 2,250
  - Estimate (2010): 2,220 (−1.3%)

Administrative status
  - Capital of: Mezhdurechensky District, Sukhonsky Selsoviet

Municipal status
  - Municipal district: Mezhdurechensky Municipal District
  - Rural settlement: Sukhonskoye Rural Settlement
  - Capital of: Mezhdurechensky Municipal District, Sukhonskoye Rural Settlement
- Time zone: UTC+3 (MSK)
- Postal code: 161050
- OKTMO ID: 19632424101

Shuyskoye (Russian: Шу́йское) is a rural locality (a selo) and the administrative center of Mezhdurechensky District of Vologda Oblast, Russia, located on the right bank of the Sukhona River. It also serves as the administrative center of Sukhonsky Selsoviet, one of the eight selsoviets into which the district is administratively divided. Municipally, it is the administrative center of Sukhonskoye Rural Settlement. Population: 2,250 (2010 census); 2,436 (2002 census); 2,531 (1989 Soviet census).

== History ==
The area was populated by Finnic peoples and then colonized by the Novgorod Republic. The principal direction of the colonization was along the Sukhona, which at the time was the main waterway connecting central Russia with the White Sea. In the 15th century, the area gradually went under the control of the Grand Duchy of Moscow, after being split into insignificant principalities. The lands on the right bank of the Sukhona form the historical region of Mitropolye, the name originating from the fact that once they were dependent on the Metropolitan of Rostov. The selo of Shuyskoye was first mentioned in 1555 as Shuysky Nizovets and achieved prominence as a settlement of shipbuilders, delivering ships mainly to Vologda.

In the course of the administrative reform carried out in 1708 by Peter the Great the area was included into Archangelgorod Governorate. In 1780, the governorate was abolished and transformed into Vologda Viceroyalty. The viceroyalty was abolished in 1796, and the part of it which included Shuyskoye was made Vologda Governorate. In the 19th century, Shuyskoye was the center of Shuyskaya Volost of Totemsky Uyezd. In 1919, it was transferred to Gryazovetsky Uyezd. In 1924, Gryazovetsky Uyezd was abolished, and its area, including Shuyskoye, was transferred to Vologodsky Uyezd.

On July 15, 1929, several governorates, including Vologda Governorate, were merged into Northern Krai, and the uyezds were abolished. Instead, Shuysky District with the administrative center in Shuyskoye was established as part of Vologda Okrug. In 1931, Shuysky District was renamed into Mezhdurechensky District.

== Economy ==
=== Industry ===
The economy of Shuyskoye and Mezhdurechensky District is based on timber industry. There is also food industry, in particular, soft drink production.

=== Transportation ===
Shuyskoye is connected by an all-seasonal road with Vologda and Gryazovets. To get to the villages on the left bank of the Sukhona by car one needs to detour via Vologda and Kadnikov.

The Sukhona is navigable in the district limits, however, there is no passenger navigation.

== Culture and recreation ==
There are two museums located in Shuyskoye, the Mezhdurechensky District Museum and Nikolay Rubtsov Memorial museum. Nikolay Rubtsov, the Russian poet, never lived in Shuyskoye, however, he studied and worked in Totma, and his girlfriend at the time was living in Shuyskoye. It is presumed that Rubtsov visited Shuyskoye on at least two occasions.

Aleksandr Korkin, a Russian mathematician, was born in Shuyskoye, but left for Vologda to study in the secondary school and never lived in Shuyskoye afterwards.
