= Mezhdurechensky District, Vologda Oblast =

Mezhdurechensky District Междуреченский район
- District
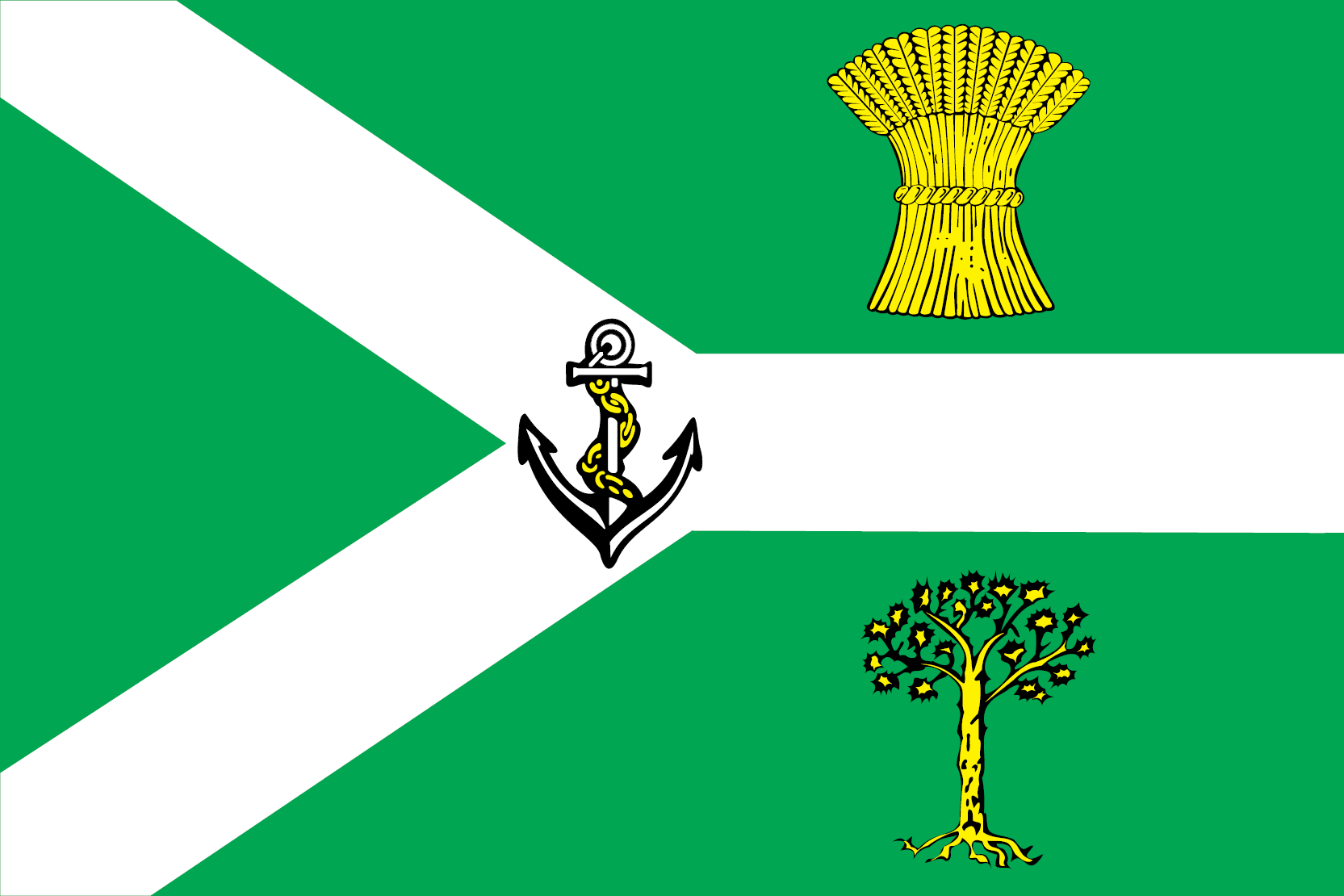
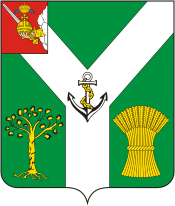
- Flag Coat of arms
- Location of Mezhdurechensky District in Vologda Oblast
- Coordinates: 59°22′N 41°02′E
- Country: Russia
- Federal subject: Vologda Oblast
- Established: July 15, 1929
- Administrative center: Shuyskoye

Area
  - Total: 3,600 km^{2} (1,400 sq mi)

Population (2010 Census)
  - Total: 6,112
  - Density: 1.7/km^{2} (4.4/sq mi)
  - Urban: 0%
  - Rural: 100%

Administrative structure
  - Administrative divisions: 8 selsoviet
  - Inhabited localities: 156 rural localities

Municipal structure
  - Municipally incorporated as: Mezhdurechensky Municipal District
  - Municipal divisions: 0 urban settlements, 5 rural settlements
- Time zone: UTC+3 (MSK)
- OKTMO ID: 19632000
- Website: http://www.mr35.ru/

Mezhdurechensky District (Russian: Междуре́ченский райо́н) is an administrative and municipal district (raion), one of the twenty-six in Vologda Oblast, Russia. It is located in the center of the oblast and borders with Sokolsky District in the north, Totemsky District in the northeast, Soligalichsky District of Kostroma Oblast in the southeast, Gryazovetsky District in the south, and with Vologodsky District in the west. The area of the district is 3,600 square kilometers (1,400 sq mi). Its administrative center is the rural locality (a selo) of Shuyskoye. District's population: 6,112 (2010 Census); 7,641 (2002 Census); 9,361 (1989 Soviet census). The population of Shuyskoye accounts for 36.8% of the district's total population. As of 2010, Mezhdurechensky District had the lowest population among all the districts of Vologda Oblast.

== Geography ==
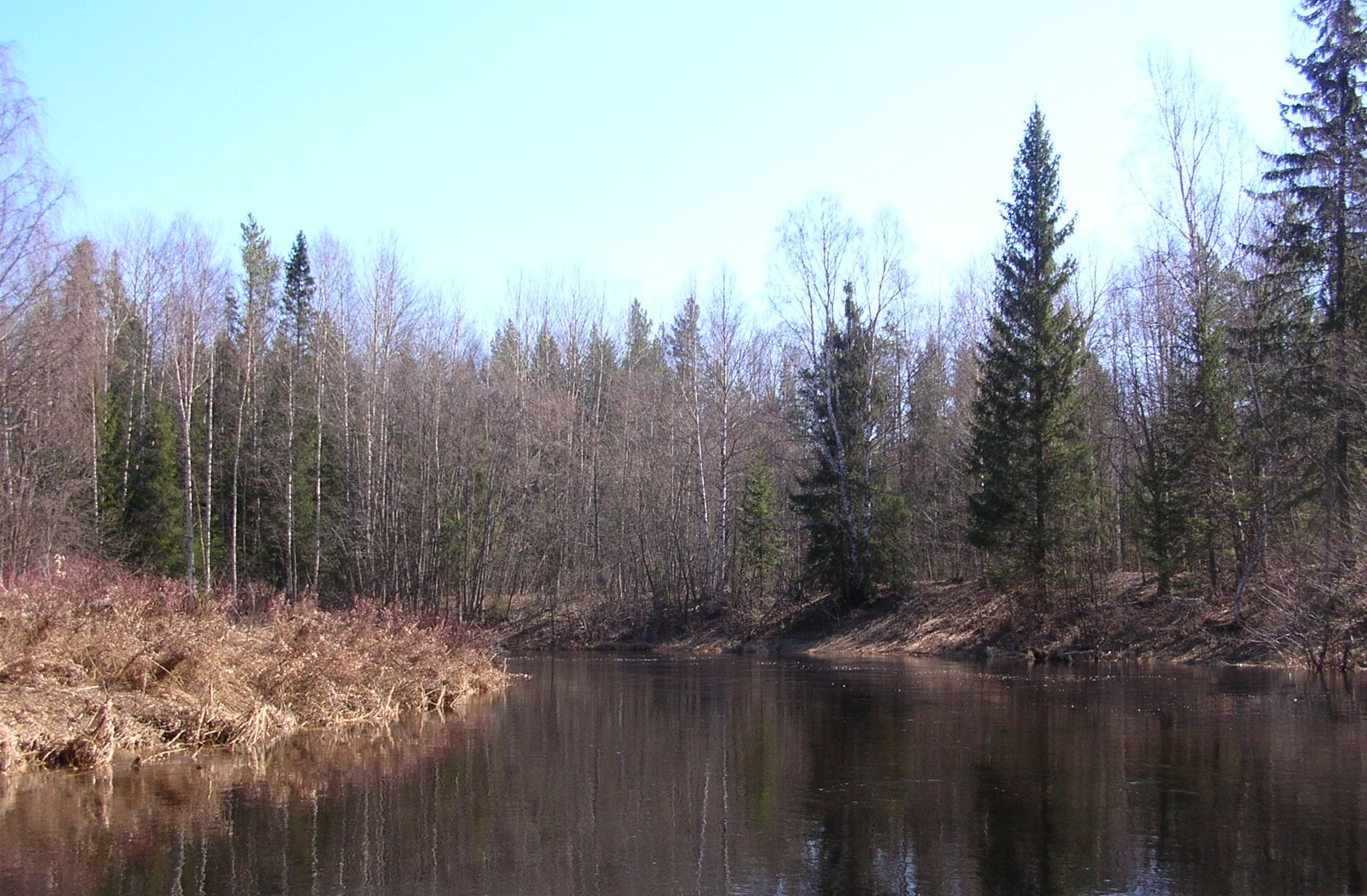
The mouth of the Voya River, seen from the Ikhalitsa River

Mezhdurechensky District is elongated from west to east and is organized along the Sukhona River, which in the western part of the district forms the border with Sokolsky District, and to the east enters the district and crosses it in the easterly direction. The biggest tributaries of the Sukhona within the district are the Lezha (right), the Dvinitsa (left), the Shuya (right), and the Ikhalitsa (right). A few rivers in the areas in the south of the district drain into the Monza River, which belongs to the basin of the Kostroma River. The district thus lies on the divide between the basins of the Northern Dvina and Volga Rivers, or between the Arctic Ocean and the Caspian Sea.

Considerable areas within the district are covered by coniferous forests.

Swamps cover up to 14% of the district's territory. The biggest one is the Bolshaya Chist Swamp located between the valleys of the Sukhona and the Tolshma and shared by Totemsky and Mezhdurechensky Districts and Kostroma Oblast. The area of the swamp is about 200 square kilometers (77 sq mi), making it the largest swamp in Vologda Oblast; the major part of it is treeless.

== History ==
The area was populated by Finnic peoples and then colonized by the Novgorod Republic. The principal direction of the colonization was along the Sukhona, which at the time was the main waterway connecting central Russia with the White Sea. In the 15th century, the area gradually fell under the control of the Grand Duchy of Moscow, after being split into insignificant principalities such as the Principality of Avnega. The selo of Shuyskoye was first mentioned in 1555 as Shuysky Nizovets and achieved prominence in the 17th century as a settlement of shipbuilders, delivering ships mainly to Vologda. In 1370, Avnezhsky Monastery was established on the bank of the Sukhona at the mouth of the Avnega River.

In the course of the administrative reform carried out in 1708 by Peter the Great, the area was included into Archangelgorod Governorate. In 1780, the governorate was abolished and transformed into Vologda Viceroyalty. The viceroyalty was abolished in 1796, and the part of it which included the area of what is now Mezhdurechensky District was made into Vologda Governorate. The area was split between Totemsky, Gryazovetsky, and Vologodsky Uyezds.

On July 15, 1929, several governorates, including Vologda Governorate, were merged into Northern Krai, and the uyezds were abolished. Instead, Shuysky District with the administrative center in the selo of Shuyskoye was established as a part of Vologda Okrug. In 1931, Shuysky District was renamed Mezhdurechensky. In the following years, the first-level administrative division of Russia kept changing. In 1936, Northern Krai was transformed into Northern Oblast. In 1937, Northern Oblast was split into Arkhangelsk Oblast and Vologda Oblast. Mezhdurechensky District remained in Vologda Oblast ever since.

On July 15, 1929, Tolshmensky District with the administrative center in the selo of Krasnoye was also established. On July 30, 1931, it was abolished and divided between Shuysky and Totemsky Districts.

On January 25, 1935, Biryakovsky District was established on the lands which previously belonged to Sokolsky and Mezhdurechensky Districts. The administrative center of the district became the selo of Biryakovo, currently in Sokolsky District. In 1959, it was abolished and split between Sokolsky and Mezhdurechensky Districts.

== Economy ==
=== Industry ===
The economy of the district is based on timber industry. There is also food industry, soft drink production in particular.

=== Agriculture ===
As of 2010, there were five state enterprises and twenty farms in the district. They are mostly engaged in milk production.

=== Transportation ===
Shuyskoye is connected by an all-seasonal road with Vologda and Gryazovets. There are no bridges over the Sukhona in the district, and in order to get from one bank of the Sukhona to the other bank by car, one needs to detour via Vologda and Kadnikov.

The only railroad in the district is the Monza Railroad, built for timber transport and operated by the timber production authorities, which runs along the border of Vologda and Kostroma Oblasts. The railroad crosses the southern part of Mezhdurechensky District. The plans to extend it further east to Nikolsk were never realized.

The Sukhona is navigable within the district limits; however, there is no passenger navigation.

== Culture and recreation ==
The district contains one archaeological monument of federal significance (the Chudinovo site) and three historical monuments of local significance.

There are two museums in the district, both located in Shuyskoye: the Mezhdurechensky District Museum and Nikolay Rubtsov Memorial Museum. Nikolay Rubtsov, a Russian poet, never lived in Shuyskoye; however, he studied and worked in Totma, and his girlfriend at the time was living in Shuyskoye. It is presumed that Rubtsov visited Shuyskoye on at least two occasions.

Aleksandr Korkin, a Russian mathematician, was born in Shuyskoye, but left for Vologda to study in the secondary school and never lived in Shuyskoye afterwards.
