= Malaya Semyonovskaya =

Malaya Semyonovskaya Малая Семёновская
- Village
- Location within Vologda Oblast Location within Russia
- Coordinates: 59°59′N 42°50′E
- Country: Russia
- Region: Vologda Oblast
- District: Totemsky District
- Time zone: UTC+3:00

Malaya Semyonovskaya (Russian: Малая Семёновская) is a rural locality (a village) in Pyatovskoye Rural Settlement, Totemsky District, Vologda Oblast, Russia. The population was 5 as of 2002.

== Geography ==
Malaya Semyonovskaya is located 7 km northeast of Totma (the district's administrative centre) by road. Chalovskaya is the nearest rural locality.
