= Varnitsy =

Varnitsy Варницы
- Village
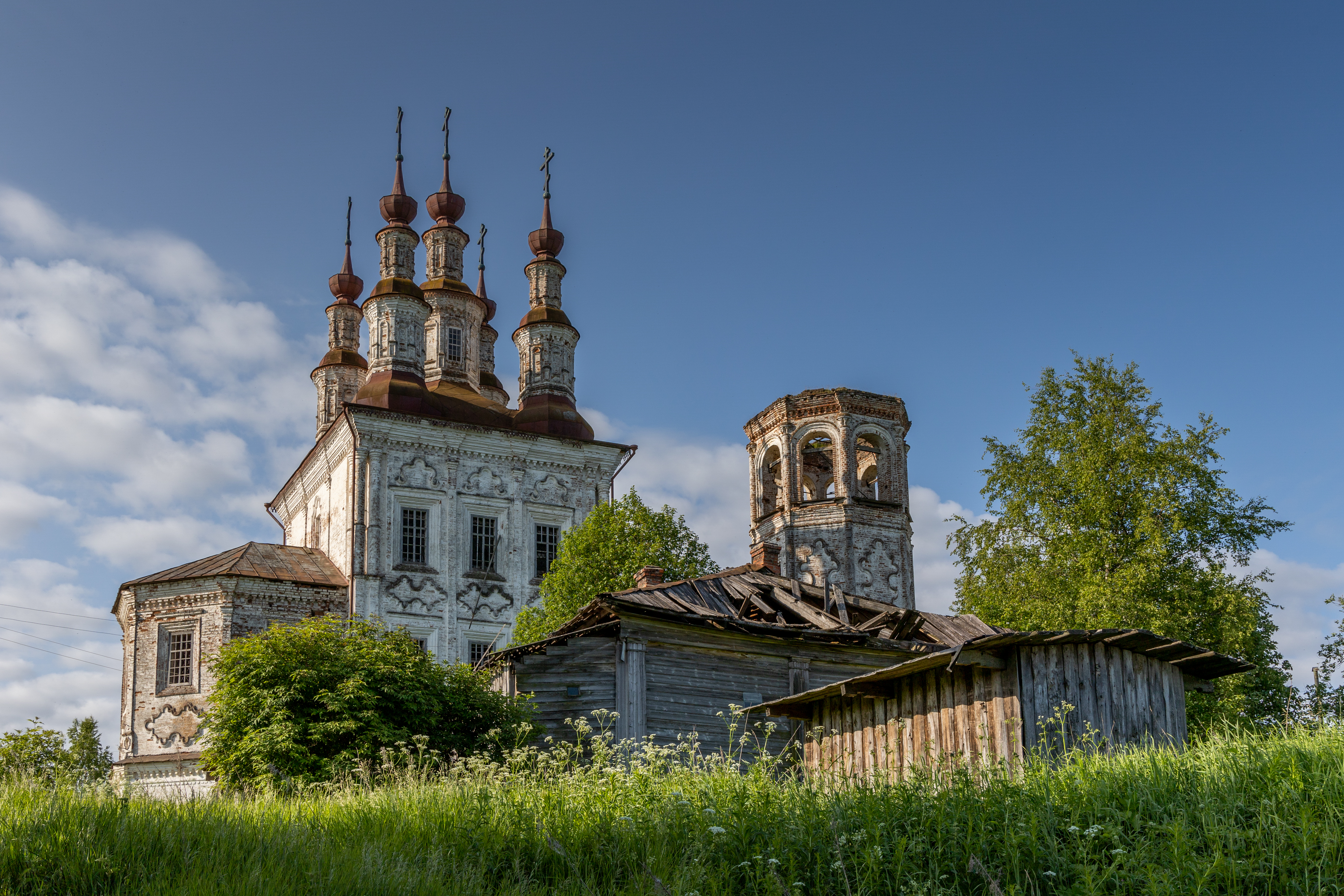
- Closed Church of the Resurrection of Christ

- Location within Vologda Oblast Location within Russia
- Coordinates: 59°59′N 42°45′E
- Country: Russia
- Region: Vologda Oblast
- District: Totemsky District
- Time zone: UTC+3:00

Varnitsy (Russian: Варницы) is a rural locality (a village) in Pyatovskoye Rural Settlement, Totemsky District, Vologda Oblast, Russia. The population was 791 as of 2002. There are 16 streets.

== Geography ==
Varnitsy is located 2 km north of Totma (the district's administrative centre) by road. Pyatovskaya is the nearest rural locality.
