= Maslikha, Vologda Oblast =

Maslikha Маслиха
- Village
- Location within Vologda Oblast Location within Russia
- Coordinates: 59°41′N 41°54′E
- Country: Russia
- Region: Vologda Oblast
- District: Totemsky District
- Time zone: UTC+3:00

Maslikha (Russian: Маслиха) is a rural locality (a village) in Pogorelovskoye Rural Settlement, Totemsky District, Vologda Oblast, Russia. The population was 10 as of 2002.

== Geography ==
Maslikha is located 63 km southwest of Totma (the district's administrative centre) by road. Yakunikha is the nearest rural locality.
