= Tryznovo =

Tryznovo Трызново
- Village
- Location within Vologda Oblast Location within Russia
- Coordinates: 59°28′N 42°33′E
- Country: Russia
- Region: Vologda Oblast
- District: Totemsky District
- Time zone: UTC+3:00

Tryznovo (Russian: Трызново) is a rural locality (a village) in Tolshmenskoye Rural Settlement, Totemsky District, Vologda Oblast, Russia. The population was 9 as of 2002.

== Geography ==
Tryznovo is located 79 km south of Totma (the district's administrative centre) by road. Surovtsovo is the nearest rural locality.
