= Zuikha =

Zuikha Зуиха
- Village
- Location within Vologda Oblast Location within Russia
- Coordinates: 59°51′N 42°19′E
- Country: Russia
- Region: Vologda Oblast
- District: Totemsky District
- Time zone: UTC+3:00

Zuikha (Russian: Зуиха) is a rural locality (a village) in Kalininskoye Rural Settlement, Totemsky District, Vologda Oblast, Russia. The population was 6 as of 2002.

== Geography ==
Zuikha is located 31 km southwest of Totma (the district's administrative centre) by road. Orlovka is the nearest rural locality.
