= Gavshino =

Gavshino Гавшино
- Village
- Location within Vologda Oblast Location within Russia
- Coordinates: 60°21′N 42°04′E
- Country: Russia
- Region: Vologda Oblast
- District: Totemsky District
- Time zone: UTC+3:00

Gavshino (Russian: Гавшино) is a rural locality (a village) in Moseyevskoye Rural Settlement, Totemsky District, Vologda Oblast, Russia. The population was 2 as of 2002.

== Geography ==
Gavshino is located 70 km northwest of Totma (the district's administrative centre) by road. Kontsevskaya is the nearest rural locality.
