= Sovetsky, Totemsky District, Vologda Oblast =

Sovetsky Советский
- Settlement
- Location within Vologda Oblast Location within Russia
- Coordinates: 59°55′N 42°43′E
- Country: Russia
- Region: Vologda Oblast
- District: Totemsky District
- Time zone: UTC+3:00

Sovetsky (Russian: Советский) is a rural locality (a settlement) in Pyatovskoye Rural Settlement, Totemsky District, Vologda Oblast, Russia. The population was 1,447 as of 2002. There are 21 streets.

== Geography ==
Sovetsky is located 7 km southwest of Totma (the district's administrative centre) by road. Zadnyaya is the nearest rural locality.
