= Galitskaya =

Galitskaya Галицкая
- Village
- Location within Vologda Oblast Location within Russia
- Coordinates: 59°59′N 42°44′E
- Country: Russia
- Region: Vologda Oblast
- District: Totemsky District
- Time zone: UTC+3:00

Galitskaya (Russian: Галицкая) is a rural locality (a village) in Pyatovskoye Rural Settlement, Totemsky District, Vologda Oblast, Russia. The population was 84 as of 2002. There are 4 streets.

== Geography ==
Galitskaya is located 3 km north of Totma (the district's administrative centre) by road. Varnitsy is the nearest rural locality.
