= Mishukovo =

Mishukovo (Russian: Мишуково) is the name of several rural localities in Russia.

- Mishukovo, Chuvash Republic, a selo in Mishukovskoye Rural Settlement of Poretsky District in the Chuvash Republic
- Mishukovo, Leningrad Oblast, a village in Shugozerskoye Settlement Municipal Formation of Tikhvinsky District in Leningrad Oblast
- Mishukovo, Dmitrovsky District, Moscow Oblast, a village in Kulikovskoye Rural Settlement of Dmitrovsky District in Moscow Oblast
- Mishukovo, Noginsky District, Moscow Oblast, a village in Yamkinskoye Rural Settlement of Noginsky District in Moscow Oblast
- Mishukovo, Murmansk Oblast, an inhabited locality in Mezhdurechensky Territorial Okrug of Kolsky District in Murmansk Oblast
- Mishukovo, Nizhny Novgorod Oblast, a selo in Yuryevsky Selsoviet of Gaginsky District in Nizhny Novgorod Oblast
- Mishukovo, Ryazan Oblast, a village in Savostyanovsky Rural Okrug of Kasimovsky District in Ryazan Oblast
- Mishukovo, Smolensk Oblast, a village in Malyshevskoye Rural Settlement of Yelninsky District in Smolensk Oblast
- Mishukovo, Tver Oblast, a village in Molodotudskoye Rural Settlement of Oleninsky District in Tver Oblast
- Mishukovo, Vologda Oblast, a village in Vozhbalsky Selsoviet of Totemsky District in Vologda Oblast
- Mishukovo, Yaroslavl Oblast, a village in Pestretsovsky Rural Okrug of Yaroslavsky District in Yaroslavl Oblast
