= Osovaya =

Osovaya Осовая
- Village
- Location within Vologda Oblast Location within Russia
- Coordinates: 59°43′N 42°27′E
- Country: Russia
- Region: Vologda Oblast
- District: Totemsky District
- Time zone: UTC+3:00

Osovaya (Russian: Осовая) is a rural locality (a village) in Kalininskoye Rural Settlement, Totemsky District, Vologda Oblast, Russia. The population was 21 as of 2002.

== Geography ==
Osovaya is located 47 km southwest of Totma (the district's administrative centre) by road. Pavlovskaya is the nearest rural locality.
