= Nizhnyaya Pechenga =

Nizhnyaya Pechenga Нижняя Печеньга
- Village
- Location within Vologda Oblast Location within Russia
- Coordinates: 60°04′N 43°33′E
- Country: Russia
- Region: Vologda Oblast
- District: Totemsky District
- Time zone: UTC+3:00

Nizhnyaya Pechenga (Russian: Нижняя Печеньга) is a rural locality (a village) in Medvedevskoye Rural Settlement, Totemsky District, Vologda Oblast, Russia. The population was 37 as of 2002.

== Geography ==
Nizhnyaya Pechenga is located 57 km northeast of Totma (the district's administrative centre) by road. Mikhaylovka is the nearest rural locality.
