= Ilyukhinskaya =

Ilyukhinskaya Илюхинская
- Village
- Location within Vologda Oblast Location within Russia
- Coordinates: 60°07′N 41°56′E
- Country: Russia
- Region: Vologda Oblast
- District: Totemsky District
- Time zone: UTC+3:00

Ilyukhinskaya (Russian: Илюхинская) is a rural locality (a village) in Vozhbalskoye Rural Settlement, Totemsky District, Vologda Oblast, Russia. The population was 1 as of 2002.

== Geography ==
Ilyukhinskaya is located 70 km northwest of Totma (the district's administrative centre) by road. Nikitinskaya is the nearest rural locality.
