= Ukhtanga =

Ukhtanga Ухтанга
- Village
- Location within Vologda Oblast Location within Russia
- Coordinates: 59°50′N 42°39′E
- Country: Russia
- Region: Vologda Oblast
- District: Totemsky District
- Time zone: UTC+3:00

Ukhtanga (Russian: Ухтанга) is a rural locality (a village) in Kalininskoye Rural Settlement, Totemsky District, Vologda Oblast, Russia. The population was 7 as of 2002.

== Geography ==
Ukhtanga is located 44 km southwest of Totma (the district's administrative centre) by road. Churilovka is the nearest rural locality.
