= Ryazanka =

Ryazanka Рязанка
- Village
- Location within Vologda Oblast Location within Russia
- Coordinates: 59°54′N 42°31′E
- Country: Russia
- Region: Vologda Oblast
- District: Totemsky District
- Time zone: UTC+3:00

Ryazanka (Russian: Рязанка) is a rural locality (a village) in Kalininskoye Rural Settlement, Totemsky District, Vologda Oblast, Russia. The population was 32 as of 2002.

== Geography ==
Ryazanka is located 39 km southwest of Totma (the district's administrative centre) by road. Selo is the nearest rural locality.
