= Yakunikha =

Yakunikha Якуниха
- Village
- Location within Vologda Oblast Location within Russia
- Coordinates: 59°41′N 41°56′E
- Country: Russia
- Region: Vologda Oblast
- District: Totemsky District
- Time zone: UTC+3:00

Yakunikha (Russian: Якуниха) is a rural locality (a village) in Pogorelovskoye Rural Settlement, Totemsky District, Vologda Oblast, Russia. The population was 48 as of 2002.

== Geography ==
Yakunikha is located 61 km southwest of Totma (the district's administrative centre) by road. Fedorovskaya is the nearest rural locality.
