= Nikitin Pochinok =

Nikitin Pochinok Никитин Починок
- Village
- Location within Vologda Oblast Location within Russia
- Coordinates: 60°15′N 42°18′E
- Country: Russia
- Region: Vologda Oblast
- District: Totemsky District
- Time zone: UTC+3:00

Nikitin Pochinok (Russian: Никитин Починок) is a rural locality (a village) in Moseyevskoye Rural Settlement, Totemsky District, Vologda Oblast, Russia. The population was 18 as of 2002.

== Geography ==
Nikitin Pochinok is located 58 km northwest of Totma (the district's administrative centre) by road. Danilov Pochinok is the nearest rural locality.
