= Kudrinskaya, Totemsky District, Vologda Oblast =

Kudrinskaya Кудринская
- Village
- Location within Vologda Oblast Location within Russia
- Coordinates: 59°59′N 42°17′E
- Country: Russia
- Region: Vologda Oblast
- District: Totemsky District
- Time zone: UTC+3:00

Kudrinskaya (Russian: Кудринская) is a rural locality (a village) and the administrative center of Vozhbalskoye Rural Settlement, Totemsky District, Vologda Oblast, Russia. The population was 281 as of 2002.

== Geography ==
Kudrinskaya is located 42 km west of Totma (the district's administrative centre) by road. Sergeyevo is the nearest rural locality.
