= Kozhinskaya =

Kozhinskaya Кожинская
- Village
- Location within Vologda Oblast Location within Russia
- Coordinates: 60°09′N 42°20′E
- Country: Russia
- Region: Vologda Oblast
- District: Totemsky District
- Time zone: UTC+3:00

Kozhinskaya (Russian: Кожинская) is a rural locality (a village) in Moseyevskoye Rural Settlement, Totemsky District, Vologda Oblast, Russia. The population was 10 as of 2002.

== Geography ==
Kozhinskaya is located 35 km northwest of Totma (the district's administrative centre) by road. Fominskaya is the nearest rural locality.
