= Vydrino, Vologda Oblast =

Vydrino Выдрино
- Village
- Location within Vologda Oblast Location within Russia
- Coordinates: 59°57′N 42°44′E
- Country: Russia
- Region: Vologda Oblast
- District: Totemsky District
- Time zone: UTC+3:00

Vydrino (Russian: Выдрино) is a rural locality (a village) in Pyatovskoye Rural Settlement, Totemsky District, Vologda Oblast, Russia. The population was 74 as of 2002.

== Geography ==
Vydrino is located 2 km southwest of Totma (the district's administrative centre) by road. Savino is the nearest rural locality.
