= Pervomaysky, Totemsky District, Vologda Oblast =

Pervomaysky Первомайский
- Settlement
- Location within Vologda Oblast Location within Russia
- Coordinates: 59°24′N 42°48′E
- Country: Russia
- Region: Vologda Oblast
- District: Totemsky District
- Time zone: UTC+3:00

Pervomaysky (Russian: Первомайский) is a rural locality (a settlement) in Tolshmenskoye Rural Settlement, Totemsky District, Vologda Oblast, Russia. The population was 101 as of 2002. There are 5 streets.

== Geography ==
The distance to Totma is 113 km, to Nikolskoye is 18 km. Golebatovo is the nearest rural locality.
