= Lodygino, Vologda Oblast =

Lodygino Лодыгино
- Village
- Location within Vologda Oblast Location within Russia
- Coordinates: 59°58′N 42°18′E
- Country: Russia
- Region: Vologda Oblast
- District: Totemsky District
- Time zone: UTC+3:00

Lodygino (Russian: Лодыгино) is a rural locality (a village) in Vozhbalskoye Rural Settlement, Totemsky District, Vologda Oblast, Russia. The population was 2 as of 2002.

== Geography ==
Lodygino is located 40 km west of Totma (the district's administrative centre) by road. Berezhok is the nearest rural locality.
