= Vorlygino =

Vorlygino Ворлыгино
- Village
- Location within Vologda Oblast Location within Russia
- Coordinates: 59°59′N 42°44′E
- Country: Russia
- Region: Vologda Oblast
- District: Totemsky District
- Time zone: UTC+3:00

Vorlygino (Russian: Ворлыгино) is a rural locality (a village) in Pyatovskoye Rural Settlement, Totemsky District, Vologda Oblast, Russia. The population was 21 as of 2002.

== Geography ==
Vorlygino is located 2 km northwest of Totma (the district's administrative centre) by road. Pyatovskaya is the nearest rural locality.
