= Kochenga =

Kochenga Коченьга
- Village
- Location within Vologda Oblast Location within Russia
- Coordinates: 60°09′N 43°32′E
- Country: Russia
- Region: Vologda Oblast
- District: Totemsky District
- Time zone: UTC+3:00

Kochenga (Russian: Коченьга) is a rural locality (a village) in Medvedevskoye Rural Settlement, Totemsky District, Vologda Oblast, Russia. The population was 37 as of 2002.

== Geography ==
Kochenga is located 54 km northeast of Totma (the district's administrative centre) by road.
