= Vaulovo, Vologda Oblast =

Vaulovo Ваулово
- Village
- Location within Vologda Oblast Location within Russia
- Coordinates: 59°26′N 42°50′E
- Country: Russia
- Region: Vologda Oblast
- District: Totemsky District
- Time zone: UTC+3:00

Vaulovo (Russian: Ваулово) is a rural locality (a village) in Tolshmenskoye Rural Settlement, Totemsky District, Vologda Oblast, Russia. The population was 21 as of 2002.

== Geography ==
Vaulovo is located 101 km south of Totma (the district's administrative centre) by road. Pervomaysky is the nearest rural locality.
