= Maximovskaya =

Maximovskaya Максимовская
- Village
- Location within Vologda Oblast Location within Russia
- Coordinates: 59°52′N 42°22′E
- Country: Russia
- Region: Vologda Oblast
- District: Totemsky District
- Time zone: UTC+3:00

Maximovskaya (Russian: Максимовская) is a rural locality (a village) in Kalininskoye Rural Settlement, Totemsky District, Vologda Oblast, Russia. The population was 2 as of 2002.

== Geography ==
Maximovskaya is located 29 km southwest of Totma (the district's administrative centre) by road. Klimovskaya is the nearest rural locality.
