= Pogorelovo, Totemsky District, Vologda Oblast =

Pogorelovo Погорелово
- Village
- Location within Vologda Oblast Location within Russia
- Coordinates: 59°42′N 42°02′E
- Country: Russia
- Region: Vologda Oblast
- District: Totemsky District
- Time zone: UTC+3:00

Pogorelovo (Russian: Погорелово) is a rural locality (a village) and the administrative center of Pogorelovskoye Rural Settlement, Totemsky District, Vologda Oblast, Russia. The population was 388 as of 2002. There are 7 streets.

== Geography ==
Pogorelovo is located 56 km southwest of Totma (the district's administrative centre) by road. Boyarskoye is the nearest rural locality.
