= Knyazhaya =

Knyazhaya Княжая
- Village
- Location within Vologda Oblast Location within Russia
- Coordinates: 59°58′N 42°50′E
- Country: Russia
- Region: Vologda Oblast
- District: Totemsky District
- Time zone: UTC+3:00

Knyazhaya (Russian: Княжая) is a rural locality (a village) in Pyatovskoye Rural Settlement, Totemsky District, Vologda Oblast, Russia. The population was only 9 residents as of 2002.

== Geography ==
Knyazhaya is located 6 km east of Totma (the district's administrative centre) by road. Posyolok Myasokombinata is the nearest rural locality.
