= Golebatovo =

Golebatovo Голебатово
- Village
- Location within Vologda Oblast Location within Russia
- Coordinates: 59°23′N 42°47′E
- Country: Russia
- Region: Vologda Oblast
- District: Totemsky District
- Time zone: UTC+3:00

Golebatovo (Russian: Голебатово) is a rural locality (a village) in Tolshmenskoye Rural Settlement, Totemsky District, Vologda Oblast, Russia. The population was 12 as of 2002. There are 4 streets.

== Geography ==
Golebatovo is located 95 km south of Totma (the district's administrative centre) by road. Uspenye is the nearest rural locality.
