= Braginskaya =

Braginskaya Брагинская
- Village
- Location within Vologda Oblast Location within Russia
- Coordinates: 59°59′N 42°44′E
- Country: Russia
- Region: Vologda Oblast
- District: Totemsky District
- Time zone: UTC+3:00

Braginskaya (Russian: Брагинская) is a rural locality (a village) in Pyatovskoye Rural Settlement, Totemsky District, Vologda Oblast, Russia. The population was 52 as of 2002.

== Geography ==
Braginskaya is located 4 km northwest of Totma (the district's administrative centre) by road. Galitskaya is the nearest rural locality.
