= Kamchuga (village) =

Kamchuga Камчуга
- Village
- Location within Vologda Oblast Location within Russia
- Coordinates: 60°02′N 43°10′E
- Country: Russia
- Region: Vologda Oblast
- District: Totemsky District
- Time zone: UTC+3:00

Kamchuga (Russian: Камчуга) is a rural locality (a village) in Medvedevskoye Rural Settlement, Totemsky District, Vologda Oblast, Russia. The population was 23 as of 2002.

== Geography ==
Kamchuga is located 30 kilometers northeast of Totma (the district's administrative centre) by road. Kamchuga (settlement) is the nearest rural locality.
