= Bolshoy Gorokh =

Bolshoy Gorokh Большой Горох
- Village
- Location within Vologda Oblast Location within Russia
- Coordinates: 59°45′N 42°32′E
- Country: Russia
- Region: Vologda Oblast
- District: Totemsky District
- Time zone: UTC+3:00

Bolshoy Gorokh (Russian: Большой Горох) is a rural locality (a village) in Kalininskoye Rural Settlement, Totemsky District, Vologda Oblast, Russia. The population was 58 as of 2002.

== Geography ==
Bolshoy Gorokh is located 41 km southwest of Totma (the district's administrative centre) by road. Osovaya is the nearest rural locality.
