= Surovtsovo =

Surovtsovo Суровцово
- Village
- Location within Vologda Oblast Location within Russia
- Coordinates: 59°27′N 42°34′E
- Country: Russia
- Region: Vologda Oblast
- District: Totemsky District
- Time zone: UTC+3:00

Surovtsovo (Russian: Суровцово) is a rural locality (a village) in Tolshmenskoye Rural Settlement, Totemsky District, Vologda Oblast, Russia. The population was 4 as of 2002.

== Geography ==
Surovtsovo is located 80 km south of Totma (the district's administrative centre) by road. Galkino is the nearest rural locality.
