= Churilovka =

Churilovka Чуриловка
- Settlement
- Location within Vologda Oblast Location within Russia
- Coordinates: 59°50′N 42°40′E
- Country: Russia
- Region: Vologda Oblast
- District: Totemsky District
- Time zone: UTC+3:00

Churilovka (Russian: Чуриловка) is a rural locality (a settlement) in Velikodvorskoye Rural Settlement, Totemsky District, Vologda Oblast, Russia. The population was 348 as of 2002.

== Geography ==
Churilovka is located 27 km southwest of Totma (the district's administrative centre) by road. Ukhtanga is the nearest rural locality.
