= Vershininskaya =

Vershininskaya Вершининская
- Village
- Location within Vologda Oblast Location within Russia
- Coordinates: 60°19′N 41°55′E
- Country: Russia
- Region: Vologda Oblast
- District: Totemsky District
- Time zone: UTC+3:00

Vershininskaya (Russian: Вершининская) is a rural locality (a village) in Moseyevskoye Rural Settlement, Totemsky District, Vologda Oblast, Russia. The population was 18 as of 2002.

== Geography ==
Vershininskaya is located 76 km northwest of Totma (the district's administrative centre) by road. Zharovsky Pogost is the nearest rural locality.
