= Toporikha =

Toporikha Топориха
- Village
- Location within Vologda Oblast Location within Russia
- Coordinates: 59°40′N 42°04′E
- Country: Russia
- Region: Vologda Oblast
- District: Totemsky District
- Time zone: UTC+3:00

Toporikha (Russian: Топориха) is a rural locality (a village) in Pogorelovskoye Rural Settlement, Totemsky District, Vologda Oblast, Russia. The population was 22 as of 2002. There are 6 streets.

== Geography ==
Toporikha is located 58 km southwest of Totma (the district's administrative centre) by road. Svetitsa is the nearest rural locality.
