= Yermolitsa =

Yermolitsa Ермолица
- Village
- Location within Vologda Oblast Location within Russia
- Coordinates: 59°23′N 42°44′E
- Country: Russia
- Region: Vologda Oblast
- District: Totemsky District
- Time zone: UTC+3:00

Yermolitsa (Russian: Ермолица) is a rural locality (a village) in Tolshmenskoye Rural Settlement, Totemsky District, Vologda Oblast, Russia. The population was 14 as of 2002.

== Geography ==
Yermolitsa is located 93 km south of Totma (the district's administrative centre) by road. Uspenye is the nearest rural locality.
