= Nikitinskaya, Totemsky District, Vologda Oblast =

Nikitinskaya Никитинская
- Village
- Location within Vologda Oblast Location within Russia
- Coordinates: 60°07′N 41°55′E
- Country: Russia
- Region: Vologda Oblast
- District: Totemsky District
- Time zone: UTC+3:00

Nikitinskaya (Russian: Никитинская) is a rural locality (a village) in Vozhbalskoye Rural Settlement, Totemsky District, Vologda Oblast, Russia. The population was 2 as of 2002.

== Geography ==
Nikitinskaya is located 71 km northwest of Totma (the district's administrative centre) by road. Ilyukhinskaya is the nearest rural locality.
