= Zadnyaya, Totemsky District, Vologda Oblast =

Zadnyaya Задняя
- Village
- Location within Vologda Oblast Location within Russia
- Coordinates: 59°56′N 42°43′E
- Country: Russia
- Region: Vologda Oblast
- District: Totemsky District
- Time zone: UTC+3:00

Zadnyaya (Russian: Задняя) is a rural locality (a village) in Pyatovskoye Rural Settlement, Totemsky District, Vologda Oblast, Russia. The population was 520 as of 2002. There are 9 streets.

== Geography ==
Zadnyaya is located 4 km southwest of Totma (the district's administrative center by road. Glubokoye is the nearest rural locality.
