= Bolshaya Semyonovskaya =

Bolshaya Semyonovskaya Большая Семёновская
- Village
- Location within Vologda Oblast Location within Russia
- Coordinates: 59°59′55″N 42°45′20″E
- Country: Russia
- Region: Vologda Oblast
- District: Totemsky District

Population (2010)
  - Total: 25
- Time zone: UTC+3:00

Bolshaya Semyonovskaya (Russian: Большая Семёновская) is a rural locality (a village) in Pyatovskoye Rural Settlement, Totemsky District, Vologda Oblast, Russia. The population consisted of 25 people, as of the 2010 census.

== Geography ==
Bolshaya Semyonovskaya is located 4 km north of Totma (the district's administrative centre) by road. Uglitskaya is the nearest rural locality.
