= Manylovo, Vologda Oblast =

Manylovo Манылово
- Village
- Location within Vologda Oblast Location within Russia
- Coordinates: 59°35′N 42°19′E
- Country: Russia
- Region: Vologda Oblast
- District: Totemsky District
- Time zone: UTC+3:00

Manylovo (Russian: Манылово) is a rural locality (a village) in Tolshmenskoye Rural Settlement, Totemsky District, Vologda Oblast, Russia. The population was 49 as of 2002.

== Geography ==
Manylovo is located 73 km southwest of Totma (the district's administrative centre) by road. Manylovsky Pogost is the nearest rural locality.
