= Komaritsa =

Komaritsa Комарица
- Village
- Location within Vologda Oblast Location within Russia
- Coordinates: 59°40′N 42°05′E
- Country: Russia
- Region: Vologda Oblast
- District: Totemsky District
- Time zone: UTC+3:00

Komaritsa (Russian: Комарица) is a rural locality (a village) in Pogorelovskoye Rural Settlement, Totemsky District, Vologda Oblast, Russia. The population was 10 as of 2002.

== Geography ==
Komaritsa is located 59 km southwest of Totma (the district's administrative centre) by road. Toporikha is the nearest rural locality.
