= Knyazhikha, Vologda Oblast =

Knyazhikha Княжиха
- Village
- Location within Vologda Oblast Location within Russia
- Coordinates: 59°40′N 42°45′E
- Country: Russia
- Region: Vologda Oblast
- District: Totemsky District
- Time zone: UTC+3:00

Knyazhikha (Russian: Княжиха) is a rural locality (a village) in Velikodvorskoye Rural Settlement, Totemsky District, Vologda Oblast, Russia. The population was 127 as of 2002.

== Geography ==
Knyazhikha is located 48 km south of Totma (the district's administrative centre) by road. Veliky Dvor is the nearest rural locality.
