= Kameshkurye =

Kameshkurye Камешкурье
- Village
- Location within Vologda Oblast Location within Russia
- Coordinates: 59°30′N 42°30′E
- Country: Russia
- Region: Vologda Oblast
- District: Totemsky District
- Time zone: UTC+3:00

Kameshkurye (Russian: Камешкурье) is a rural locality (a village) in Tolshmenskoye Rural Settlement, Totemsky District, Vologda Oblast, Russia. The population was 16 as of 2002.

== Geography ==
Kameshkurye is located 75 km south of Totma (the district's administrative centre) by road. Nikolskoye is the nearest rural locality.
