= Pritykino =

Pritykino Притыкино
- Village
- Location within Vologda Oblast Location within Russia
- Coordinates: 59°58′N 42°43′E
- Country: Russia
- Region: Vologda Oblast
- District: Totemsky District
- Time zone: UTC+3:00

Pritykino (Russian: Притыкино) is a rural locality (a village) in Pyatovskoye Rural Settlement, Totemsky District, Vologda Oblast, Russia. The population was 8 as of 2002.

== Geography ==
Pritykino is located 3 km southwest of Totma (the district's administrative centre) by road. Totma is the nearest rural locality.
