= Seredskaya =

Seredskaya Середская
- Village
- Location within Vologda Oblast Location within Russia
- Coordinates: 60°19′N 42°04′E
- Country: Russia
- Region: Vologda Oblast
- District: Totemsky District
- Time zone: UTC+3:00

Seredskaya (Russian: Середская) is a rural locality (a village) in Moseyevskoye Rural Settlement, Totemsky District, Vologda Oblast, Russia. The population was 141 as of 2002.

== Geography ==
Seredskaya is located 67 km northwest of Totma (the district's administrative centre) by road. Pelevikha is the nearest rural locality.
