= Chasovnoye =

Chasovnoye Часовное
- Village
- Location within Vologda Oblast Location within Russia
- Coordinates: 60°08′N 42°27′E
- Country: Russia
- Region: Vologda Oblast
- District: Totemsky District
- Time zone: UTC+3:00

Chasovnoye (Russian: Часовное) is a rural locality (a village) in Moseyevskoye Rural Settlement, Totemsky District, Vologda Oblast, Russia. The population was 6 as of 2002.

== Geography ==
Chasovnoye is located 30 km northwest of Totma (the district's administrative centre) by road. Moseyevo is the nearest rural locality.
