= Kondratyevskaya =

Kondratyevskaya Кондратьевская
- Village
- Location within Vologda Oblast Location within Russia
- Coordinates: 60°09′N 42°27′E
- Country: Russia
- Region: Vologda Oblast
- District: Totemsky District
- Time zone: UTC+3:00

Kondratyevskaya (Russian: Кондратьевская) is a rural locality (a village) in Moseyevskoye Rural Settlement, Totemsky District, Vologda Oblast, Russia. The population was 12 as of 2002.

== Geography ==
Kondratyevskaya is located 32 km northwest of Totma (the district's administrative centre) by road. Moseyevo is the nearest rural locality.
