= Dyagilevo, Totemsky District, Vologda Oblast =

Dyagilevo Дягилево
- Village
- Location within Vologda Oblast Location within Russia
- Coordinates: 60°09′N 42°25′E
- Country: Russia
- Region: Vologda Oblast
- District: Totemsky District
- Time zone: UTC+3:00

Dyagilevo (Russian: Дягилево) is a rural locality (a village) in Moseyevskoye Rural Settlement, Totemsky District, Vologda Oblast, Russia. The population was 4 as of 2002.

== Geography ==
Dyagilevo is located 32 km northwest of Totma (the district's administrative centre) by road. Moseyevo is the nearest rural locality.
