= Chernyakovo, Totemsky District, Vologda Oblast =

Chernyakovo Черняково
- Village
- Location within Vologda Oblast Location within Russia
- Coordinates: 59°58′N 42°47′E
- Country: Russia
- Region: Vologda Oblast
- District: Totemsky District
- Time zone: UTC+3:00

Chernyakovo (Russian: Черняково) is a rural locality (a village) in Pyatovskoye Rural Settlement, Totemsky District, Vologda Oblast, Russia. The population was 328 as of 2002. There are 6 streets.

== Geography ==
Chernyakovo is located 2 km southeast of Totma (the district's administrative centre) by road. Malaya Popovskaya is the nearest rural locality.
