= Manylovsky Pogost =

Manylovsky Pogost Маныловский Погост
- Village
- Location within Vologda Oblast Location within Russia
- Coordinates: 59°35′N 42°19′E
- Country: Russia
- Region: Vologda Oblast
- District: Totemsky District
- Time zone: UTC+3:00

Manylovsky Pogost (Russian: Маныловский Погост) is a rural locality (a village) in Tolshmenskoye Rural Settlement, Totemsky District, Vologda Oblast, Russia. The population was 43 as of 2002.

== Geography ==
Manylovsky Pogost is located 74 km southwest of Totma (the district's administrative centre) by road. Manylovo is the nearest rural locality.
