= Kalininskoye, Vologda Oblast =

Kalininskoye Калининское
- Village
- Location within Vologda Oblast Location within Russia
- Coordinates: 59°53′N 42°27′E
- Country: Russia
- Region: Vologda Oblast
- District: Totemsky District
- Time zone: UTC+3:00

Kalininskoye (Russian: Калининское) is a rural locality (a village) in Kalininskoye Rural Settlement, Totemsky District, Vologda Oblast, Russia. The population was 18 as of 2002.

== Geography ==
Kalininskoye is located 23 km southwest of Totma (the district's administrative centre) by road. Gridinskaya is the nearest rural locality.
