= Nefedikha =

Nefedikha Нефедиха
- Village
- Location within Vologda Oblast Location within Russia
- Coordinates: 59°42′N 42°42′E
- Country: Russia
- Region: Vologda Oblast
- District: Totemsky District
- Time zone: UTC+3:00

Nefedikha (Russian: Нефедиха) is a rural locality (a village) in Velikodvorskoye Rural Settlement, Totemsky District, Vologda Oblast, Russia. The population was 7 as of 2002.

== Geography ==
Nefedikha is located 46 km southwest of Totma (the district's administrative centre) by road. Davydikha is the nearest rural locality.
