= Mys, Totemsky District, Vologda Oblast =

Mys Мыс
- Village
- Location within Vologda Oblast Location within Russia
- Coordinates: 59°47′N 42°38′E
- Country: Russia
- Region: Vologda Oblast
- District: Totemsky District
- Time zone: UTC+3:00

Mys (Russian: Мыс) is a rural locality (a village) in Kalininskoye Rural Settlement, Totemsky District, Vologda Oblast, Russia. The population was 22 as of 2002.

== Geography ==
Mys is located 38 km southwest of Totma (the district's administrative centre) by road. Ustye is the nearest rural locality.
