= Neklyudikha =

Neklyudikha Неклюдиха
- Village
- Location within Vologda Oblast Location within Russia
- Coordinates: 59°59′N 42°59′E
- Country: Russia
- Region: Vologda Oblast
- District: Totemsky District
- Time zone: UTC+3:00

Neklyudikha (Russian: Неклюдиха) is a rural locality (a village) in Medvedevskoye Rural Settlement, Totemsky District, Vologda Oblast, Russia. The population was 1 as of 2002.

== Geography ==
Neklyudikha is located 72 km east of Totma (the district's administrative centre) by road. Kolupaiha is the nearest rural locality.
