= Uspenye =

Uspenye Успенье
- Selo
- Location within Vologda Oblast Location within Russia
- Coordinates: 59°24′N 42°46′E
- Country: Russia
- Region: Vologda Oblast
- District: Totemsky District
- Time zone: UTC+3:00

Uspenye (Russian: Успенье) is a rural locality (a selo) in Tolshmenskoye Rural Settlement, Totemsky District, Vologda Oblast, Russia. The population was 310 as of 2002. There are 4 streets.

== Geography ==
Uspenye is located 94 km south of Totma (the district's administrative centre) by road. Golevatovo is the nearest rural locality.
