= Pelevikha, Totemsky District, Vologda Oblast =

Pelevikha Пелевиха
- Village
- Location within Vologda Oblast Location within Russia
- Coordinates: 60°19′N 42°04′E
- Country: Russia
- Region: Vologda Oblast
- District: Totemsky District
- Time zone: UTC+3:00

Pelevikha (Russian: Пелевиха) is a rural locality (a village) in Moseyevskoye Rural Settlement, Totemsky District, Vologda Oblast, Russia. The population was 61 as of 2002.

== Geography ==
Pelevikha is located 68 km northwest of Totma (the district's administrative centre) by road. Seredskaya is the nearest rural locality.
