= Kontsevskaya =

Kontsevskaya Концевская
- Village
- Location within Vologda Oblast Location within Russia
- Coordinates: 60°20′N 42°03′E
- Country: Russia
- Region: Vologda Oblast
- District: Totemsky District
- Time zone: UTC+3:00

Kontsevskaya (Russian: Концевская) is a rural locality (a village) in Moseyevskoye Rural Settlement, Totemsky District, Vologda Oblast, Russia. The population was 3 as of 2002.

== Geography ==
Kontsevskaya is located 68 km northwest of Totma (the district's administrative centre) by road. Pelevikha is the nearest rural locality.
