= Shulevo =

Shulevo Шулево
- Village
- Location within Vologda Oblast Location within Russia
- Coordinates: 59°58′N 42°17′E
- Country: Russia
- Region: Vologda Oblast
- District: Totemsky District
- Time zone: UTC+3:00

Shulevo (Russian: Шулево) is a rural locality (a village) in Vozhbalskoye Rural Settlement, Totemsky District, Vologda Oblast, Russia. The population was 8 as of 2002.

== Geography ==
Shulevo is located 42 km west of Totma (the district's administrative centre) by road. Mishukovo is the nearest rural locality.
