= Posyolok Myasokombinata =

Posyolok Myasokombinata Посёлок Мясокомбината
- Settlement
- Location within Vologda Oblast Location within Russia
- Coordinates: 59°57′N 42°48′E
- Country: Russia
- Region: Vologda Oblast
- District: Totemsky District
- Time zone: UTC+3:00

Posyolok Myasokombinata (Russian: Посёлок Мясокомбината) is a rural locality (a settlement) in Pyatovskoye Rural Settlement, Totemsky District, Vologda Oblast, Russia. The population was 200 as of 2002.

== Geography ==
Posyolok Myasokombinata is located 4 km southeast of Totma (the district's administrative centre) by road. Tekstilshchiki is the nearest rural locality.
