= Radchino =

Radchino Радчино
- Village
- Location within Vologda Oblast Location within Russia
- Coordinates: 59°51′N 42°22′E
- Country: Russia
- Region: Vologda Oblast
- District: Totemsky District
- Time zone: UTC+3:00

Radchino (Russian: Радчино) is a rural locality (a village) in Kalininskoye Rural Settlement, Totemsky District, Vologda Oblast, Russia. The population was 13 as of 2002.

== Geography ==
Radchino is located 29 km southwest of Totma (the district's administrative centre) by road. Tabory is the nearest rural locality.
