= Rodnaya =

Rodnaya Родная
- Village
- Location within Vologda Oblast Location within Russia
- Coordinates: 59°50′N 41°59′E
- Country: Russia
- Region: Vologda Oblast
- District: Totemsky District
- Time zone: UTC+3:00

Rodnaya (Russian: Родная) is a rural locality (a village) in Pogorelovskoye Rural Settlement, Totemsky District, Vologda Oblast, Russia. The population was 104 as of 2002.

== Geography ==
Rodnaya is located 56 km southwest of Totma (the district's administrative centre) by road. Manylovitsa is the nearest rural locality.
