= Antusheva Gora =

Antusheva Gora Антушева Гора
- Village
- Location within Vologda Oblast Location within Russia
- Coordinates: 60°20′N 41°56′E
- Country: Russia
- Region: Vologda Oblast
- District: Totemsky District
- Time zone: UTC+3:00

Antusheva Gora (Russian: Антушева Гора) is a rural locality (a village) in Moseyevskoye Rural Settlement, Totemsky District, Vologda Oblast, Russia. The population was 9 as of 2002.

== Geography ==
Antusheva Gora is located 79 km northwest of Totma (the district's administrative centre) by road. Petrishcheva Gora is the nearest rural locality.
