= Fedorovskaya =

Fedorovskaya Федоровская
- Village
- Location within Vologda Oblast Location within Russia
- Coordinates: 59°41′N 41°55′E
- Country: Russia
- Region: Vologda Oblast
- District: Totemsky District
- Time zone: UTC+3:00

Fedorovskaya (Russian: Федоровская) is a rural locality (a village) in Pogorelovskoye Rural Settlement, Totemsky District, Vologda Oblast, Russia. The population was 23 as of September 11, 2001.

== Geography ==
Fedorovskaya is located 62 km southwest of Totma (the district's administrative centre) by road. Yakunikha is the nearest rural locality.
