= Nelyubino =

Nelyubino Нелюбино
- Village
- Location within Vologda Oblast Location within Russia
- Coordinates: 59°59′N 42°50′E
- Country: Russia
- Region: Vologda Oblast
- District: Totemsky District
- Time zone: UTC+3:00

Nelyubino (Russian: Нелюбино) is a rural locality (a village) in Pyatovskoye Rural Settlement, Tarnogsky District, Vologda Oblast, Russia. The population was 33 as of 2002.

== Geography ==
Nelyubino is located 6 km northwest of Totma (the district's administrative centre) by road. Lesnikovo is the nearest rural locality.
