= Ignachevo, Totemsky District, Vologda Oblast =

Ignachevo Игначево
- Village
- Location within Vologda Oblast Location within Russia
- Coordinates: 59°55′N 42°31′E
- Country: Russia
- Region: Vologda Oblast
- District: Totemsky District
- Time zone: UTC+3:00

Ignachevo (Russian: Игначево) is a rural locality (a village) in Kalininskoye Rural Settlement, Totemsky District, Vologda Oblast, Russia. The population was seven inhabitants as of 2002.

== Geography ==
Ignachevo is located 18 km southwest of Totma (the district's administrative centre) by road. Lenino is the nearest rural locality.
