= Pogost, Vologda Oblast =

Pogost Погост
- Village
- Location within Vologda Oblast Location within Russia
- Coordinates: 59°42′N 42°02′E
- Country: Russia
- Region: Vologda Oblast
- District: Totemsky District
- Time zone: UTC+3:00

Pogost (Russian: Погост) is a rural locality (a village) in Pogorelovskoye Rural Settlement, Totemsky District, Vologda Oblast, Russia. The population was 104 as of 2002. There are 3 streets.

== Geography ==
Pogost is located 56 km southwest of Totma (the district's administrative centre) by road. Pogorelovo is the nearest rural locality.
