= Lobanikha, Totemsky District, Vologda Oblast =

Lobanikha Лобаниха
- Village
- Location within Vologda Oblast Location within Russia
- Coordinates: 60°02′N 43°03′E
- Country: Russia
- Region: Vologda Oblast
- District: Totemsky District
- Time zone: UTC+3:00

Lobanikha (Russian: Лобаниха) is a rural locality (a village) in Medvedevskoye Rural Settlement, Totemsky District, Vologda Oblast, Russia. The population was 10 as of 2002.

== Geography ==
Lobanikha is located 20 km northeast of Totma (the district's administrative centre) by road. Sovinskaya is the nearest rural locality.
