= Krutaya Osyp =

Krutaya Osyp Крутая Осыпь
- Settlement
- Location within Vologda Oblast Location within Russia
- Coordinates: 60°04′N 42°09′E
- Country: Russia
- Region: Vologda Oblast
- District: Totemsky District
- Time zone: UTC+3:00

Krutaya Osyp (Russian: Крутая Осыпь) is a rural locality (a settlement) in Vozhbalskoye Rural Settlement, Totemsky District, Vologda Oblast, Russia. The population was 237 as of 2002.

== Geography ==
Krutaya Osyp is located 54 km northwest of Totma (the district's administrative centre) by road. Zakharovskaya is the nearest rural locality.
