= Yekimikha =

Yekimikha Екимиха
- Village
- Location within Vologda Oblast Location within Russia
- Coordinates: 59°52′N 42°26′E
- Country: Russia
- Region: Vologda Oblast
- District: Totemsky District
- Time zone: UTC+3:00

Yekimikha (Russian: Екимиха) is a rural locality (a village) in Kalininskoye Rural Settlement, Totemsky District, Vologda Oblast, Russia. The population was 58 as of 2002.

== Geography ==
Yekimikha is located 25 km southwest of Totma (the district's administrative centre) by road. Tsareva is the nearest rural locality.
