= Ugryumovskaya =

Ugryumovskaya Угрюмовская
- Village
- Location within Vologda Oblast Location within Russia
- Coordinates: 60°07′N 41°57′E
- Country: Russia
- Region: Vologda Oblast
- District: Totemsky District
- Time zone: UTC+3:00

Ugryumovskaya (Russian: Угрюмовская) is a rural locality (a village) in Vozhbalskoye Rural Settlement, Totemsky District, Vologda Oblast, Russia. The population was 5 as of 2002.

== Geography ==
Ugryumovskaya is located 69 km northwest of Totma (the district's administrative centre) by road. Zakharovskaya is the nearest rural locality.
