= Manylovitsa =

Manylovitsa Маныловица
- Village
- Location within Vologda Oblast Location within Russia
- Coordinates: 59°44′N 42°03′E
- Country: Russia
- Region: Vologda Oblast
- District: Totemsky District
- Time zone: UTC+3:00

Manylovitsa (Russian: Маныловица) is a rural locality (a village) in Pogorelovskoye Rural Settlement, Totemsky District, Vologda Oblast, Russia. The population was 88 as of 2002.

== Geography ==
Manylovitsa is located 56 km southwest of Totma (the district's administrative centre) by road. Gorbentsovo is the nearest rural locality.
