= Savino, Totemsky District, Vologda Oblast =

Savino Савино
- Village
- Location within Vologda Oblast Location within Russia
- Coordinates: 59°57′N 42°44′E
- Country: Russia
- Region: Vologda Oblast
- District: Totemsky District
- Time zone: UTC+3:00

Savino (Russian: Савино) is a rural locality (a village) in Pyatovskoye Rural Settlement, Totemsky District, Vologda Oblast, Russia. The population was 190 as of 2002. There are 3 streets.

== Geography ==
Savino is located 2 km southwest of Totma (the district's administrative centre) by road. Vydrino is the nearest rural locality.
