= Kotelnoye, Totemsky District, Vologda Oblast =

Kotelnoye Котельное
- Settlement
- Location within Vologda Oblast Location within Russia
- Coordinates: 59°39′N 42°07′E
- Country: Russia
- Region: Vologda Oblast
- District: Totemsky District
- Time zone: UTC+3:00

Kotelnoye (Russian: Котельное) is a rural locality (a settlement) in Pogorelovskoye Rural Settlement, Totemsky District, Vologda Oblast, Russia. The population was 56 as of 2002. There are 2 streets.

== Geography ==
Kotelnoye is located 61 km southwest of Totma (the district's administrative centre) by road. Svetitsa is the nearest rural locality.
