= Malaya Popovskaya =

Malaya Popovskaya Малая Поповская
- Village
- Location within Vologda Oblast Location within Russia
- Coordinates: 59°58′N 42°47′E
- Country: Russia
- Region: Vologda Oblast
- District: Totemsky District
- Time zone: UTC+3:00

Malaya Popovskaya (Russian: Малая Поповская) is a rural locality (a village) in Pyatovskoye Rural Settlement, Totemsky District, Vologda Oblast, Russia. The population was 55 as of 2002.

== Geography ==
Malaya Popovskaya is located 2 km east of Totma (the district's administrative centre) by road. Totma is the nearest rural locality.
