= Vorotishna =

Vorotishna Воротишна
- Village
- Location within Vologda Oblast Location within Russia
- Coordinates: 59°32′N 42°27′E
- Country: Russia
- Region: Vologda Oblast
- District: Totemsky District
- Time zone: UTC+3:00

Vorotishna (Russian: Воротишна) is a rural locality (a village) in Tolshmenskoye Rural Settlement, Totemsky District, Vologda Oblast, Russia. The population was 23 as of 2002.

== Geography ==
Vorotishna is located 84 km southwest of Totma (the district's administrative centre) by road. Shulgino is the nearest rural locality.
