= Pustosh, Totemsky District, Vologda Oblast =

Pustosh Пустошь
- Village
- Location within Vologda Oblast Location within Russia
- Coordinates: 60°06′N 42°44′E
- Country: Russia
- Region: Vologda Oblast
- District: Totemsky District
- Time zone: UTC+3:00

Pustosh (Russian: Пустошь) is a rural locality (a village) in Pyatovskoye Rural Settlement, Totemsky District, Vologda Oblast, Russia. The population was 13 as of 2002.

== Geography ==
Pustosh is located 18 km north of Totma (the district's administrative centre) by road. Matveyevo is the nearest rural locality.
