= Telpino =

Telpino Тельпино
- Village
- Location within Vologda Oblast Location within Russia
- Coordinates: 60°00′N 42°20′E
- Country: Russia
- Region: Vologda Oblast
- District: Totemsky District
- Time zone: UTC+3:00

Telpino (Russian: Тельпино) is a rural locality (a village) in Vozhbalskoye Rural Settlement, Totemsky District, Vologda Oblast, Russia. The population was 11 as of 2002.

== Geography ==
Telpino is located 47 km west of Totma (the district's administrative centre) by road. Panovo is the nearest rural locality.
