= Desyatina, Vologda Oblast =

Desyatina Десятина
- Village
- Location within Vologda Oblast Location within Russia
- Coordinates: 59°54′N 42°42′E
- Country: Russia
- Region: Vologda Oblast
- District: Totemsky District
- Time zone: UTC+3:00

Desyatina (Russian: Десятина) is a rural locality (a village) in Pyatovskoye Rural Settlement, Totemsky District, Vologda Oblast, Russia. The population was 41 as of 2002.

== Geography ==
Desyatina is located 10 km southwest of Totma (the district's administrative centre) by road. Sovetsky is the nearest rural locality.
