= Gremyachy, Totemsky District, Vologda Oblast =

Gremyachy Гремячий
- Settlement
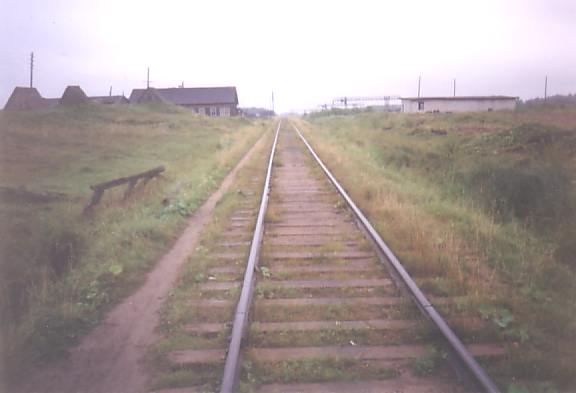

- Location within Vologda Oblast Location within Russia
- Coordinates: 59°19′N 42°32′E
- Country: Russia
- Region: Vologda Oblast
- District: Totemsky District
- Time zone: UTC+3:00

Gremyachy (Russian: Гремячий) is a rural locality (a settlement) in Tolshmenskoye Rural Settlement, Totemsky District, Vologda Oblast, Russia. The population was 481 as of 2002. There are 13 streets.

== Geography ==
Gremyachy is located 96 km (60 mi) south of Totma (the district's administrative centre) by road. Sosnovaya is the nearest rural locality.
