= Ust-Yedenga =

Ust-Yedenga Усть-Еденьга
- Settlement
- Location within Vologda Oblast Location within Russia
- Coordinates: 59°57′N 42°50′E
- Country: Russia
- Region: Vologda Oblast
- District: Totemsky District
- Time zone: UTC+3:00

Ust-Yedenga (Russian: Усть-Еденьга) is a rural locality (a settlement) in Pyatovskoye Rural Settlement, Totemsky District, Vologda Oblast, Russia. The population was 225 as of 2002.

== Geography ==
Ust-Yedenga is located 5 km southeast of Totma (the district's administrative centre) by road. Tekstilshchiki is the nearest rural locality.
