= Shulgino, Totemsky District, Vologda Oblast =

Shulgino Шульгино
- Village
- Location within Vologda Oblast Location within Russia
- Coordinates: 59°32′N 42°26′E
- Country: Russia
- Region: Vologda Oblast
- District: Totemsky District
- Time zone: UTC+3:00

Shulgino (Russian: Шульгино) is a rural locality (a village) in Tolshmenskoye Rural Settlement, Totemsky District, Vologda Oblast, Russia. The population was 2 as of 2002.

== Geography ==
Shulgino is located 85 km southwest of Totma (the district's administrative centre) by road. Filino is the nearest rural locality.
