= Svetitsa, Totemsky District, Vologda Oblast =

Svetitsa Светица
- Village
- Location within Vologda Oblast Location within Russia
- Coordinates: 59°41′N 42°05′E
- Country: Russia
- Region: Vologda Oblast
- District: Totemsky District
- Time zone: UTC+3:00

Svetitsa (Russian: Светица) is a rural locality (a village) in Pogorelovskoye Rural Settlement, Totemsky District, Vologda Oblast, Russia. The population was 4 as of 2002. There are 5 streets.

== Geography ==
Svetitsa is located 57 km southwest of Totma (the district's administrative centre) by road. Toporikha is the nearest rural locality.
