= Lesnikovo, Vologda Oblast =

Lesnikovo Лесниково
- Village
- Location within Vologda Oblast Location within Russia
- Coordinates: 59°59′N 42°51′E
- Country: Russia
- Region: Vologda Oblast
- District: Totemsky District
- Time zone: UTC+3:00

Lesnikovo (Russian: Лесниково) is a rural locality (a village) in Pyatovskoye Rural Settlement, Totemsky District, Vologda Oblast, Russia. The population was 11 as of 2002.

== Geography ==
Lesnikovo is located 7 km northeast of Totma (the district's administrative centre) by road. Nelyubino is the nearest rural locality.
