= Karitsa, Vologda Oblast =

Karitsa Карица
- Settlement
- Location within Vologda Oblast Location within Russia
- Coordinates: 59°18′N 42°50′E
- Country: Russia
- Region: Vologda Oblast
- District: Totemsky District
- Time zone: UTC+3:00

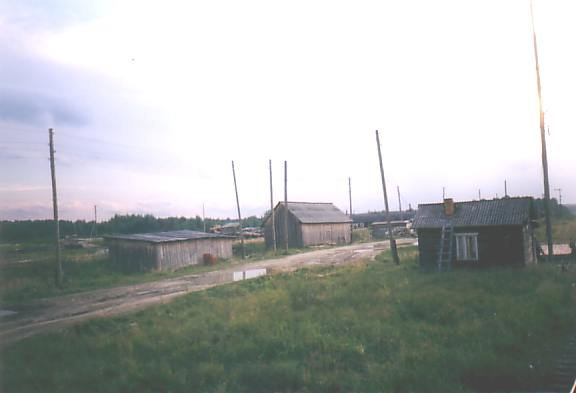
Karitsa, Totemsky District, Vologda Oblast

Karitsa (Russian: Карица) is a rural locality (a settlement) in Tolshmenskoye Rural Settlement, Totemsky District, Vologda Oblast, Russia. The population was 475 as of 2002. There are 10 streets.

== Geography ==
Karitsa is located 107 km south of Totma (the district's administrative centre) by road. Pervomaysky is the nearest rural locality.
