= Chobotovo =

Chobotovo Чоботово
- Village
- Location within Vologda Oblast Location within Russia
- Coordinates: 59°58′N 42°44′E
- Country: Russia
- Region: Vologda Oblast
- District: Totemsky District
- Time zone: UTC+3:00

Chobotovo (Russian: Чоботово) is a rural locality (a village) in Pyatovskoye Rural Settlement, Totemsky District, Vologda Oblast, Russia. The population was 16 as of 2002.

== Geography ==
Chobotovo is located 2 km southwest of Totma (the district's administrative centre) by road. Pritykino is the nearest rural locality.
