= Levinskoye =

Levinskoye Левинское
- Village
- Location within Vologda Oblast Location within Russia
- Coordinates: 59°52′N 42°24′E
- Country: Russia
- Region: Vologda Oblast
- District: Totemsky District
- Time zone: UTC+3:00

Levinskoye (Russian: Левинское) is a rural locality (a village) in Kalininskoye Rural Settlement, Totemsky District, Vologda Oblast, Russia. The population was 15 as of 2002.

== Geography ==
Levinskoye is located 29 km southwest of Totma (the district's administrative centre) by road. Korovinskaya is the nearest rural locality.
