= Anikin Pochinok =

Anikin Pochinok Аникин Починок
- Village
- Location within Vologda Oblast Location within Russia
- Coordinates: 59°26′N 42°35′E
- Country: Russia
- Region: Vologda Oblast
- District: Totemsky District
- Time zone: UTC+3:00

Anikin Pochinok (Russian: Аникин Починок) is a rural locality (a village) in Tolshmenskoye Rural Settlement, Totemsky District, Vologda Oblast, Russia. The population was 34 as of 2002.

== Geography ==
Anikin Pochinok is located 82 km southwest of Totma (the district's administrative centre) by road. Galkino is the nearest rural locality.
