= Ust-Tsareva =

Ust-Tsareva Усть-Царева
- Settlement
- Location within Vologda Oblast Location within Russia
- Coordinates: 59°53′N 42°40′E
- Country: Russia
- Region: Vologda Oblast
- District: Totemsky District
- Time zone: UTC+3:00

Ust-Tsareva (Russian: Усть-Царева) is a rural locality (a settlement) in Pyatovskoye Rural Settlement, Totemsky District, Vologda Oblast, Russia. The population was 63 as of 2002.

== Geography ==
Ust-Tsareva is located 13 km southwest of Totma (the district's administrative centre) by road. Desyatina is the nearest rural locality.
