= Tsaryova, Vologda Oblast =

Tsaryova Царева
- Settlement
- Location within Vologda Oblast Location within Russia
- Coordinates: 59°52′N 42°25′E
- Country: Russia
- Region: Vologda Oblast
- District: Totemsky District
- Time zone: UTC+3:00

Tsaryova (Russian: Царева) is a rural locality (a settlement) and the administrative center of Kalininskoye Rural Settlement, Totemsky District, Vologda Oblast, Russia. The population was 396 as of 2002.

== Geography ==
Tsaryova is located 26 km southwest of Totma (the district's administrative centre) by road. Yekimikha is the nearest rural locality.
