= Sinyakovo =

Sinyakovo Синяково
- Village
- Location within Vologda Oblast Location within Russia
- Coordinates: 59°22′N 42°45′E
- Country: Russia
- Region: Vologda Oblast
- District: Totemsky District
- Time zone: UTC+3:00

Sinyakovo (Russian: Синяково) is a rural locality (a village) in Tolshmenskoye Rural Settlement, Totemsky District, Vologda Oblast, Russia. The population was 4 as of 2002.

== Geography ==
Sinyakovo is located 96 km south of Totma (the district's administrative centre) by road. Luchkino is the nearest rural locality.
