= Yurenino =

Yurenino Юренино
- Village
- Location within Vologda Oblast Location within Russia
- Coordinates: 59°23′N 42°46′E
- Country: Russia
- Region: Vologda Oblast
- District: Totemsky District
- Time zone: UTC+3:00

Yurenino (Russian: Юренино) is a rural locality (a village) in Tolshmenskoye Rural Settlement, Totemsky District, Vologda Oblast, Russia. The population was 12 as of 2002.

== Geography ==
Yurenino is located 94 km south of Totma (the district's administrative centre) by road. Pervomaysky is the nearest rural locality.
