= Tekstilshchiki, Vologda Oblast =

Tekstilshchiki Текстильщики
- Settlement
- Location within Vologda Oblast Location within Russia
- Coordinates: 59°57′N 42°49′E
- Country: Russia
- Region: Vologda Oblast
- District: Totemsky District
- Time zone: UTC+3:00

Tekstilshchiki (Russian: Текстильщики) is a rural locality (a settlement) in Pyatovskoye Rural Settlement, Totemsky District, Vologda Oblast, Russia. The population was 653 as of 2010. There are 7 streets.

== Geography ==
Tekstilshchiki is located 5 km southeast of Totma (the district's administrative centre) by road. Ust-Yedenga is the nearest rural locality.
