= Danilov Pochinok =

Village in Vologda Oblast, Russia

Danilov Pochinok Данилов Починок
- Village
- Location within Vologda Oblast Location within Russia
- Coordinates: 60°16′N 42°15′E
- Country: Russia
- Region: Vologda Oblast
- District: Totemsky District
- Time zone: UTC+3:00

Danilov Pochinok (Russian: Данилов Починок) is a rural locality (a village) in Moseyevskoye Rural Settlement, Totemsky District, Vologda Oblast, Russia. The population was 220 as of 2002.

== Geography ==
Danilov Pochinok is located 55 km northwest of Totma (the district's administrative centre) by road. Meleshovo is the nearest rural locality.
