= Kamchuga (settlement) =

Kamchuga Камчуга
- Settlement
- Location within Vologda Oblast Location within Russia
- Coordinates: 60°02′N 43°10′E
- Country: Russia
- Region: Vologda Oblast
- District: Totemsky District
- Time zone: UTC+3:00

Kamchuga (Russian: Камчуга) is a rural locality (a settlement) and the administrative center of Medvedevskoye Rural Settlement, Totemsky District, Vologda Oblast, Russia. The population was 760 as of 2002. There are five streets.

== Geography ==
Kamchuga is located 29 km northeast of Totma (the district's administrative centre) by road. Kamchuga (village) is the nearest rural locality.
