= Sergeyevo, Totemsky District, Vologda Oblast =

Sergeyevo Сергеево
- Village
- Location within Vologda Oblast Location within Russia
- Coordinates: 59°58′N 42°17′E
- Country: Russia
- Region: Vologda Oblast
- District: Totemsky District
- Time zone: UTC+3:00

Sergeyevo (Russian: Сергеево) is a rural locality (a village) in Vozhbalskoye Rural Settlement, Totemsky District, Vologda Oblast, Russia. The population was 20 as of 2002.

== Geography ==
Sergeyevo is located 41 km west of Totma (the district's administrative centre) by road. Kudrinskaya is the nearest rural locality.
