= Cherepanikha, Totemsky District, Vologda Oblast =

Cherepanikha Черепаниха
- Village
- Location within Vologda Oblast Location within Russia
- Coordinates: 59°38′N 42°14′E
- Country: Russia
- Region: Vologda Oblast
- District: Totemsky District
- Time zone: UTC+3:00

Cherepanikha (Russian: Черепаниха) is a rural locality (a village) in Pogorelovskoye Rural Settlement, Totemsky District, Vologda Oblast, Russia. The population was 33 as of 2002.

== Geography ==
Cherepanikha is located 65 km southwest of Totma (the district's administrative centre) by road. Krasnoye is the nearest rural locality.
