= Uglitskaya =

Uglitskaya Углицкая
- Village
- Location within Vologda Oblast Location within Russia
- Coordinates: 59°59′N 42°45′E
- Country: Russia
- Region: Vologda Oblast
- District: Totemsky District
- Time zone: UTC+3:00

Uglitskaya (Russian: Углицкая) is a rural locality (a village) in Pyatovskoye Rural Settlement, Totemsky District, Vologda Oblast, Russia. The population was 31 as of 2002.

== Geography ==
Uglitskaya is located 3 km north of Totma (the district's administrative centre) by road. Varnitsy is the nearest rural locality.
