= Puzovka =

Puzovka Пузовка
- Village
- Location within Vologda Oblast Location within Russia
- Coordinates: 59°28′N 42°32′E
- Country: Russia
- Region: Vologda Oblast
- District: Totemsky District
- Time zone: UTC+3:00

Puzovka (Russian: Пузовка) is a rural locality (a village) in Tolshmenskoye Rural Settlement, Totemsky District, Vologda Oblast, Russia. The population was 15 as of 2002.

== Geography ==
Puzovka is located 77 km south of Totma (the district's administrative centre) by road. Nikolskoye is the nearest rural locality.
