= Lukinskaya, Totemsky District, Vologda Oblast =

Lukinskaya Лукинская
- Village
- Location within Vologda Oblast Location within Russia
- Coordinates: 59°54′N 42°28′E
- Country: Russia
- Region: Vologda Oblast
- District: Totemsky District
- Time zone: UTC+3:00

Lukinskaya (Russian: Лукинская) is a rural locality (a village) in Kalininskoye Rural Settlement, Totemsky District, Vologda Oblast, Russia. The population was 8 as of 2002.

== Geography ==
Lukinskaya is located 21 km southwest of Totma (the district's administrative centre) by road. Selo is the nearest rural locality.
