= Pyatovskaya, Totemsky District, Vologda Oblast =

Pyatovskaya Пятовская
- Village
- Location within Vologda Oblast Location within Russia
- Coordinates: 59°59′N 42°45′E
- Country: Russia
- Region: Vologda Oblast
- District: Totemsky District
- Time zone: UTC+3:00

Pyatovskaya (Russian: Пятовская) is a rural locality (a village) and the administrative center of Pyatovskoye Rural Settlement, Totemsky District, Vologda Oblast, Russia. The population was 109 as of 2002. There are 2 streets.

== Geography ==
Pyatovskaya is located 1 km northwest of Totma (the district's administrative centre) by road. Totma is the nearest rural locality.
