= Krasnoye, Totemsky District, Vologda Oblast =

Krasnoye Красное
- Selo
- Location within Vologda Oblast Location within Russia
- Coordinates: 59°38′N 42°14′E
- Country: Russia
- Region: Vologda Oblast
- District: Totemsky District
- Time zone: UTC+3:00

Krasnoye (Russian: Красное) is a rural locality (a selo) in Tolshmenskoye Rural Settlement, Totemsky District, Vologda Oblast, Russia. The population was 51 as of 2002. There are 3 streets.

== Geography ==
Krasnoye is located 66 km southwest of Totma (the district's administrative centre) by road. Cherepanikha is the nearest rural locality.
