= Matveyevo, Totemsky District, Vologda Oblast =

Matveyevo Матвеево
- Village
- Location within Vologda Oblast Location within Russia
- Coordinates: 60°05′N 42°48′E
- Country: Russia
- Region: Vologda Oblast
- District: Totemsky District
- Time zone: UTC+3:00

Matveyevo (Russian: Матвеево) is a rural locality (a village) in Pyatovskoye Rural Settlement, Totemsky District, Vologda Oblast, Russia. The population was 241 as of 2002. There are 5 streets.

== Geography ==
Matveyevo is located 14 km northeast of Totma (the district's administrative centre) by road. Kormakino is the nearest rural locality.
