= Nikolskoye, Totemsky District, Vologda Oblast =

Nikolskoye Никольское
- Selo
- Location within Vologda Oblast Location within Russia
- Coordinates: 59°29′N 42°31′E
- Country: Russia
- Region: Vologda Oblast
- District: Totemsky District
- Time zone: UTC+11111111

Nikolskoye (Russian: Никольское) is a rural locality (a selo) and the administrative center of Tolshmenskoye Rural Settlement, Totemsky District, Vologda Oblast, Russia. The population was 511 as of 2002. There are 10 streets.

== Geography ==
Nikolskoye is located 75 km south of Totma (the district's administrative centre) by road. Puzovka is the nearest rural locality.
