= Kashinskoye =

Kashinskoye Кашинское
- Village
- Location within Vologda Oblast Location within Russia
- Coordinates: 59°51′N 42°23′E
- Country: Russia
- Region: Vologda Oblast
- District: Totemsky District
- Time zone: UTC+3:00

Kashinskoye (Russian: Кашинское) is a rural locality (a village) in Kalininskoye Rural Settlement, Totemsky District, Vologda Oblast, Russia. The population was 14 as of 2002.

== Geography ==
Kashinskoye is located 30 km southwest of Totma (the district's administrative centre) by road. Tabory is the nearest rural locality.
