= Mishukovo, Vologda Oblast =

Mishukovo Мишуково
- Village
- Location within Vologda Oblast Location within Russia
- Coordinates: 59°58′N 42°16′E
- Country: Russia
- Region: Vologda Oblast
- District: Totemsky District
- Time zone: UTC+3:00

Mishukovo (Russian: Мишуково) is a rural locality (a village) in Vozhbalskoye Rural Settlement, Totemsky District, Vologda Oblast, Russia. The population was 20 as of 2002.

== Geography ==
Mishukovo is located 43 km west of Totma (the district's administrative centre) by road. Pakhtusovo is the nearest rural locality.
