= Kashinsky =

Kashinsky (masculine), Kashinskaya (feminine), or Kashinskoye (neuter) may refer to:

- Kashinsky District, a district of Tver Oblast, Russia
- Kashinsky (family), a Tver princely family of Rurikid stock
- Kashinskoye, a rural locality (a village) in Vologda Oblast, Russia
