= Feodosy Vakhrushov =

Russian painter

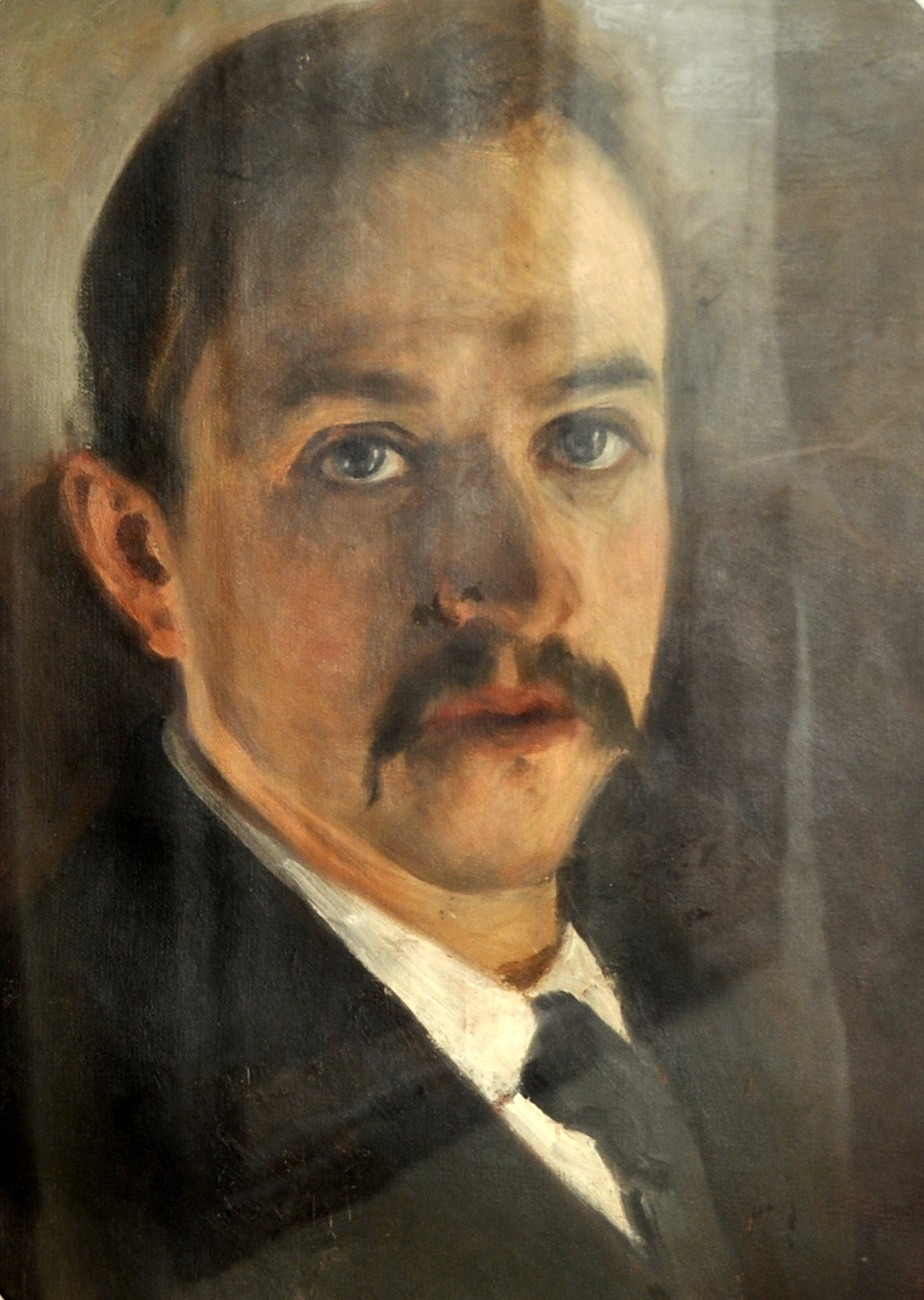
- Self-portrait
- Born: 26 February 1870; Totma, Totemsky Uyezd, Vologda Governorate, Russian Empire
- Died: 8 December 1931 (aged 61); Totma

Feodosy Mikhailovich Vakhrushov (Russian: Феодосий Михайлович Вахрушов; February 26, 1870 – December 8, 1931) was a Russian painter.

== Biography ==
Feodosy Vakhrushov was born in Totma, Vologda Governorate, Russian Empire.

The drawings of young Vakhrushev attracted the attention of Khaminova, the widow of a wealthy merchant. She was an educated woman who occasionally stopped in Totma, making trips from Solvychegodsk to Saint Petersburg. Khaminova helped him move to Tsarskoye Selo, where he lived for two years in the family of M. N. Vasiliev, adjunct professor of the Academy of Arts.

In 1886–1888 he studied at the School of Drawing, Sculpture and Architecture at the Imperial Academy of Arts.

In 1890 he became a student at the Academy of Arts.

Since 1895, he was taught by the notable painter Ilya Repin for two years.

== Gallery ==
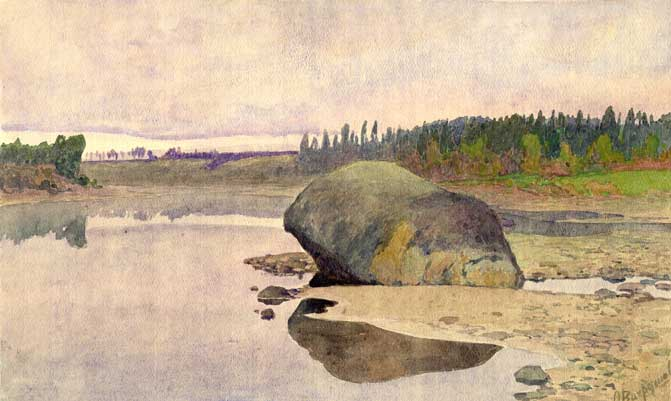

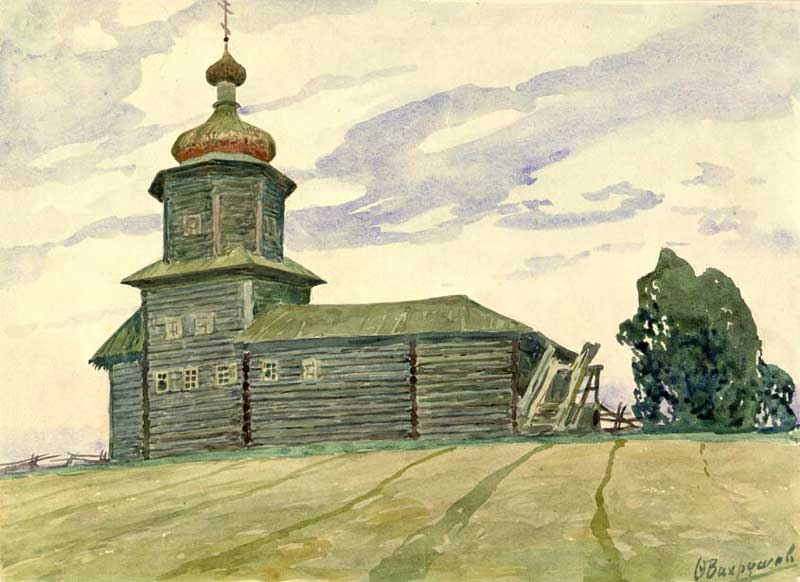

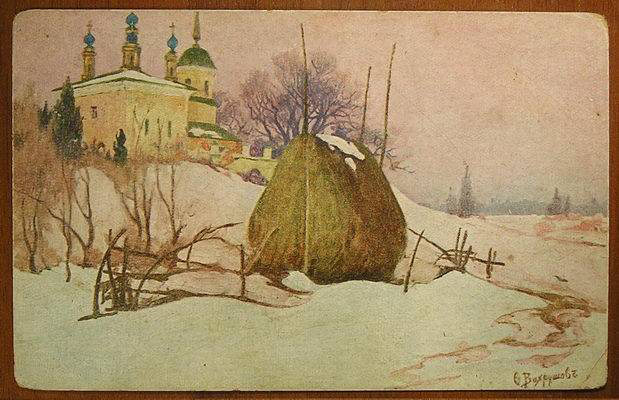
