= Totemsky District =

Totemsky District Тотемский район (Russian)
- District
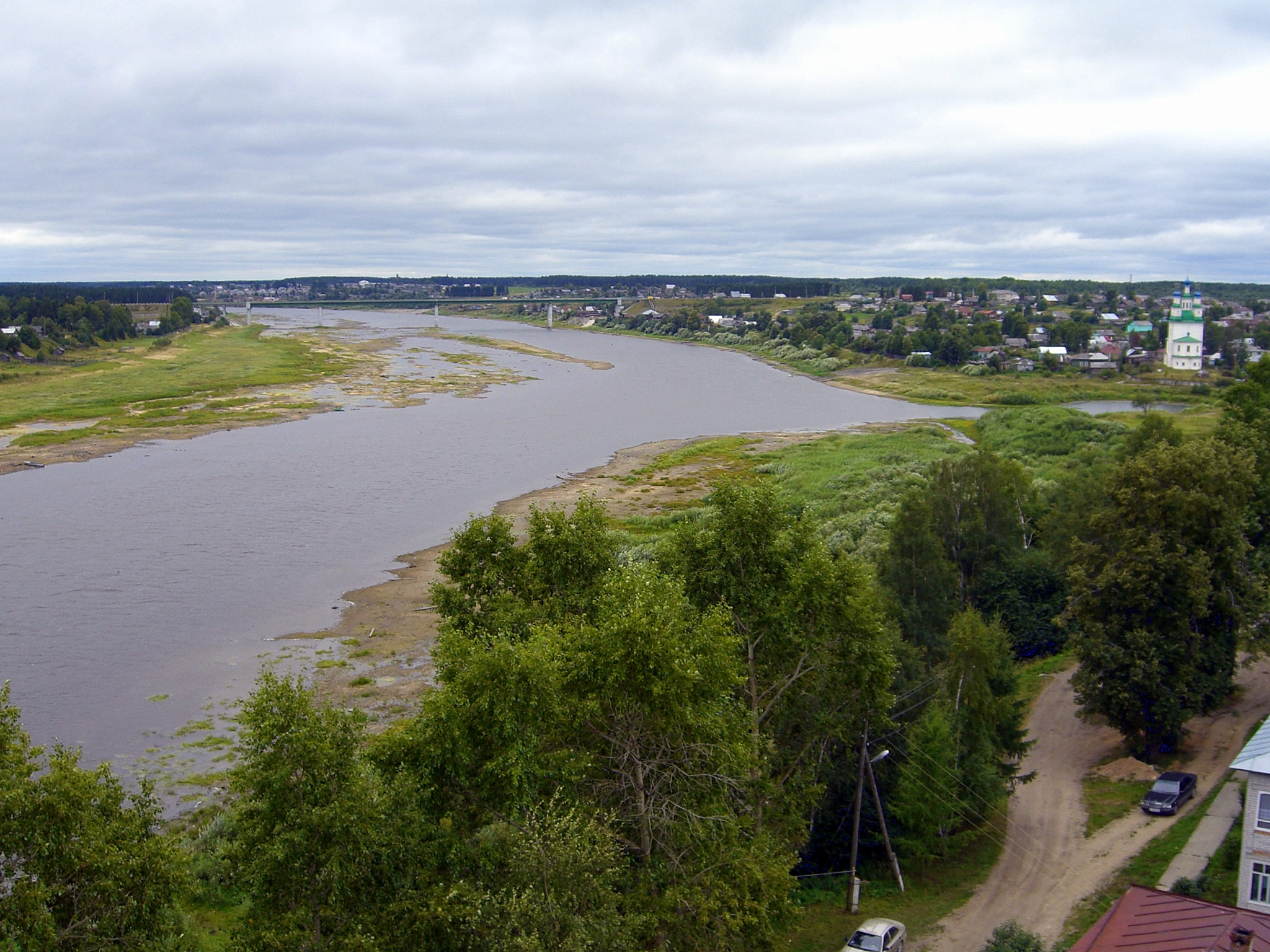
- The Sukhona River near the town of Totma in Totemsky District

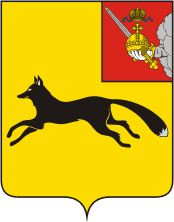
- Flag Coat of arms
- Location of Totemsky District in Vologda Oblast
- Coordinates: 59°58′N 42°45′E
- Country: Russia
- Federal subject: Vologda Oblast
- Established: July 15, 1929
- Administrative center: Totma

Area
  - Total: 8,200 km^{2} (3,200 sq mi)

Population (2010 Census)
  - Total: 23,315
  - Density: 2.8/km^{2} (7.4/sq mi)
  - Urban: 42.0%
  - Rural: 58.0%

Administrative structure
  - Administrative divisions: 1 Towns of district significance, 15 Selsoviets
  - Inhabited localities: 1 cities/towns, 225 rural localities

Municipal structure
  - Municipally incorporated as: Totemsky Municipal District
  - Municipal divisions: 1 urban settlements, 6 rural settlements
- Time zone: UTC+3 (MSK)
- OKTMO ID: 19646000
- Website: http://www.totma-region.ru

Totemsky District (Russian: То́темский райо́н) is an administrative and municipal district (raion), one of the twenty-six in Vologda Oblast, Russia. It is located in the east of the oblast and borders with Verkhovazhsky and Tarnogsky Districts in the north, Nyuksensky District in the northeast, Babushkinsky District in the east, Chukhlomsky and Soligalichsky Districts of Kostroma Oblast in the south, Mezhdurechensky and Sokolsky Districts in the southwest, and with Syamzhensky District in the west. The area of the district is 8,200 square kilometers (3,200 sq mi). Its administrative center is the town of Totma. Population: 23,315 (2010 census); 26,392 (2002 Census); 27,907 (1989 Soviet census). The population of Totma accounts for 42.0% of the district's total population.

== Geography ==
The district is elongated from south to north, with a protrusion in the northeast. The main waterway within the district limits is the Sukhona River, which crosses it from southwest to northeast. Almost all of the district lies in the basin of the Sukhona and its tributaries, including the Tolshma from the right and the Tsaryova and Yedenga from the left. Minor areas in the north of the district belong to the basins of the Vaga and Kuloy Rivers. In particular, Lake Sonduzhskoye, by far the biggest lake in the district, is the source of the Kuloy. Minor areas in the west of the district belong to the basin of the Syamzhena, a tributary of the Kubena. Some rivers in the south of the district drain into the Unzha and the Kostroma and thus, eventually, into the Volga. The divide between the basins of the Northern Dvina and the Volga, which crosses the southern part of the district, is marked by the western part of the Northern Ridge hill chain.

Considerable areas within the district are covered by coniferous forests.

Swamps cover up to 8% of the area of the district. The biggest one is the Bolshaya Chist Swamp located between the valleys of the Sukhona and the Tolshma and shared by Totemsky and Mezhdurechensky Districts and by Kostroma Oblast. The area of the swamp is about 200 square kilometers (77 sq mi) and it is mostly treeless. Bolshaya Chist is the largest area swamp in Vologda Oblast. Other swamps are located in the north of the district, in particular in the valleys of the Kuloy and the Uftyuga. Lake Sonduzhskoye is surrounded by swamps.

== History ==
Totma was first mentioned in the chronicles in 1137. It was founded by Novgorodians, who used the Sukhona River as the main waterway leading to the north and eventually to the White Sea. In the 13th century, salt production started around Totma, and the town, which was originally located downstream of the current place, was relocated. In 1539–1541, Totma was plundered by Kazan Tatars, after which a fortress was built. In the 16th century, Totma was one of the most prosperous towns of the Russian North, due to its salt production and trade. In 1554, monk Feodosy Sumorin founded the Transfiguration Monastery. In the 17th and 18th centuries, Totma was visited by Peter the Great three times, which was rather exceptional given the remote location of the town. In the 18th century, Totma was one of the main centers of the exploration of and the trade with Alaska. In particular, Ivan Kuskov, the first administrator of Fort Ross, a Russian fortress in California, was a native of Totma.

In the course of the administrative reform carried out in 1708 by Peter the Great, the area was included into Archangelgorod Governorate. Totma was explicitly mentioned as one of the towns included in the governorate. In 1780, the governorate was abolished and transformed into Vologda Viceroyalty; simultaneously, Totemsky Uyezd was established. The viceroyalty was abolished in 1796, and the part of it which included Totma became Vologda Governorate.

On July 15, 1929, several governorates, including Vologda Governorate, were merged into Northern Krai, and the uyezds were abolished. Instead, Totemsky District with the administrative center in the town of Totma was established as a part of Vologda Okrug. It included parts of the former area of Totemsky Uyezd. In the following years, the first-level administrative division of Russia kept changing. In 1936, Northern Krai was transformed into Northern Oblast. In 1937, Northern Oblast itself was split into Arkhangelsk Oblast and Vologda Oblast. Totemsky District remained in Vologda Oblast ever since.

On July 15, 1929, Tolshmensky District with the administrative center in the selo of Krasnoye was also established. On July 30, 1931, it was abolished and divided between Shuysky and Totemsky Districts. Syamzhensky District, which was also established on July 15, 1929, was likewise abolished on July 30, 1931 and divided between Totemsky and Kharovsky Districts. On January 25, 1935, Syamzhensky District was re-established.

== Administrative and municipal divisions ==
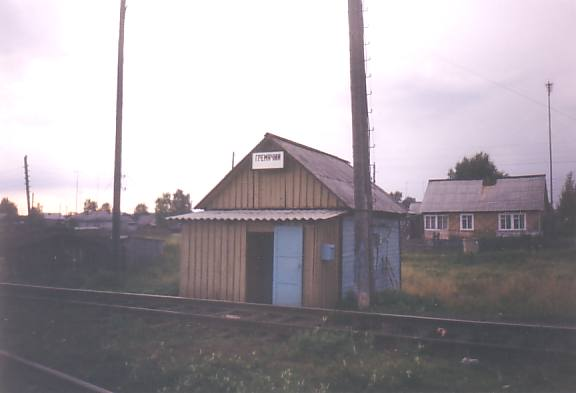
The Monza Railroad station in the settlement of Gremyachy, which is administratively a part of Gryazovetsky District, but municipally is a part of Totemsky Municipal District

As an administrative division, the district is divided into one town of district significance (Totma) and fifteen selsoviets. As a municipal division, the district is incorporated as Totemsky Municipal District and is divided into one urban and six rural settlements. The municipal district includes all of the inhabited localities of the administrative district, as well as two rural localities (the settlements of Gremyachy and Karitsa) from Gryazovetsky District.

== Economy ==
Industry (including the energy, gas, and water networks) employs 12.7% of the population of the district; further 17.1% are employed in agriculture, 15.9% in education, 12.6% in transportation services, and 11.6% in the trade.

=== Industry ===
Food industry is the major industry in the district.

=== Transportation ===
Paved roads connect Totma with Vologda via Kadnikov (southwest), Veliky Ustyug via Nyuksenitsa (northeast), and Nikolsk via Imeni Babushkina (east). Before the road between Totma and Veliky Ustyug along the Sukhona was completed in the first decade of the 2000s, the only connection between the towns was via Nikolsk.

The only railroad in the district is the Monza Railroad, built for timber transport and operated by the timber production authorities, which runs along the border of Vologda and Kostroma Oblasts. The railroad crosses Totemsky District from west to east. Plans to extend it further east to Nikolsk were never realized.

While the Sukhona is navigable within the district limits, there is no passenger navigation.

== Culture and recreation ==
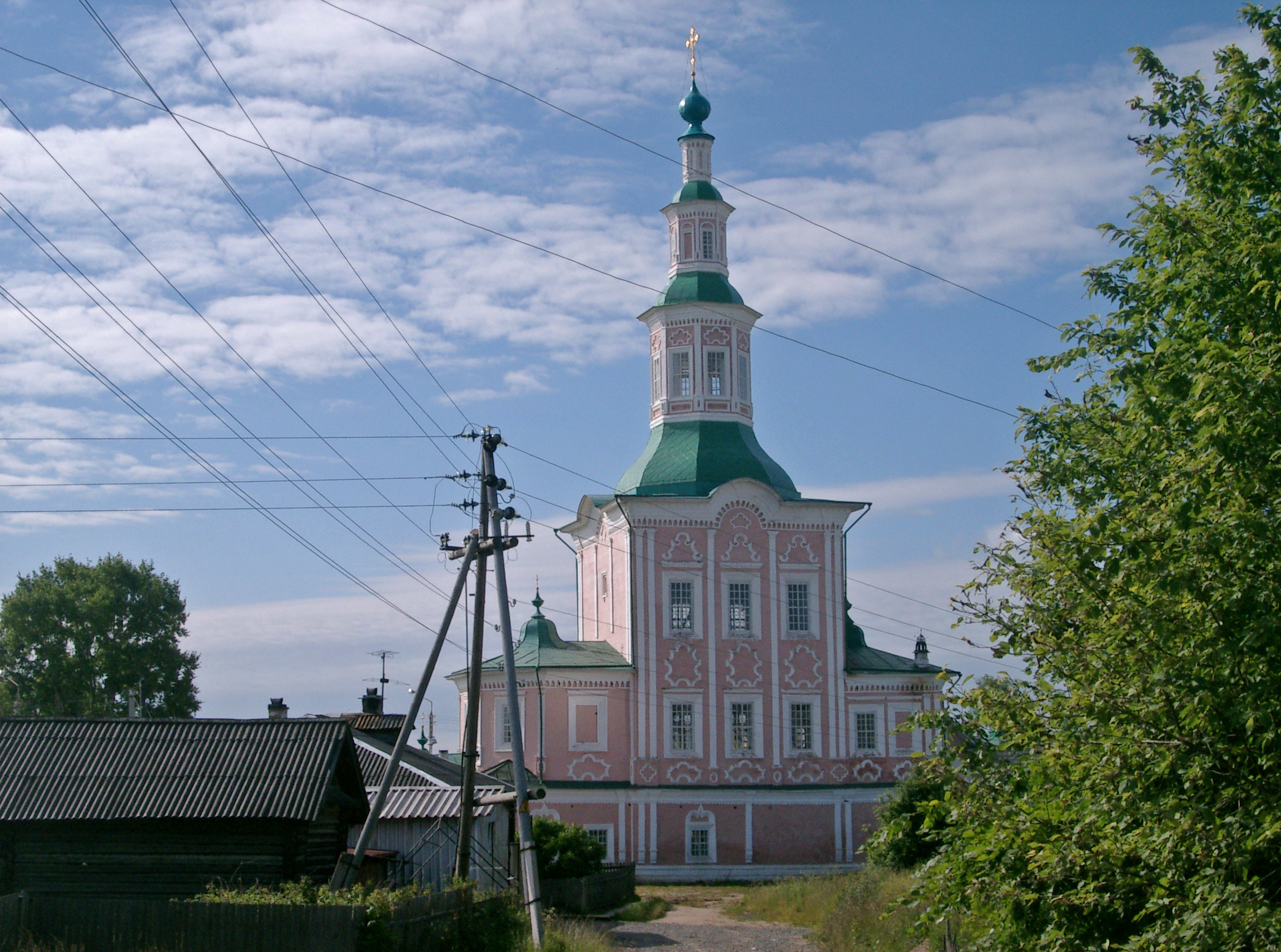
The Nativity Church in Totma (1746–1748)

Totma is a historical town which preserved, along with other heritage, several churches, all of which have similar structure not related to any other region of Russia. A Totma church is a building on which the church proper is based on one side and the bell-tower on the other side, so that the construction reminds a ship. This style is sometimes referred to as Totma Baroque.

Totemsky District has a high concentration of historical, archaeological, and architectural monuments. The district contains sixteen objects classified as cultural and historical heritage by Russian Federal law (twelve of them in the town of Totma), and additionally ninety-nine objects classified as cultural and historical heritage of local importance (seventy-four of them in Totma). Most of these are churches and chapels located in the area.

The monuments classified as cultural heritage by the federal law are the following:

- the complex of the Resurrection Church and the Assumption Church (1744–1755) in Totma
- the Nativity Church (1746–1748) in Totma
- the Trinity Church in Zelenskaya Rybatskaya Sloboda (1768–1772) in Totma
- the complex of the Church of the Entry into Jerusalem and the Church of St. John the Baptist (1738–1740) in Totma
- the Kholodilov House (middle of the 19th century) in Totma
- the ensemble of Spaso-Sumorin Monastery (1685–1689) in Totma
- the town hall of Totma
- the house where Anatoly Lunacharsky lived in 1903–1904
- the Pogost in the village of Predtecha (the Nativity Church and the Church of St. John the Baptist). The wooden Church of St. John the Baptist collapsed in 2007.
- the former location of the Totma fortress
- the Krugletsky burial ground

Totma hosts five state museums: the Totma Regional Museum, founded in 1915, the museum of Church Antiquities, the House of Ivan Kuskov, the museum of Sea Explorers (in the building of the Church of the Entry into Jerusalem), and the museum of artifacts in Spaso-Sumorin Monastery. There is also a museum in the settlement of Tsaryova, which shows ethnographic collections.

Russian poet Nikolay Rubtsov spent eight years, from 1942 (age of 6) to 1950, in an orphanage in the selo of Nikolskoye of Totemsky District. He then moved to Totma, where in 1952 he graduated from a college and then left the town.
