= Totma =

Totma Тотьма
- Town
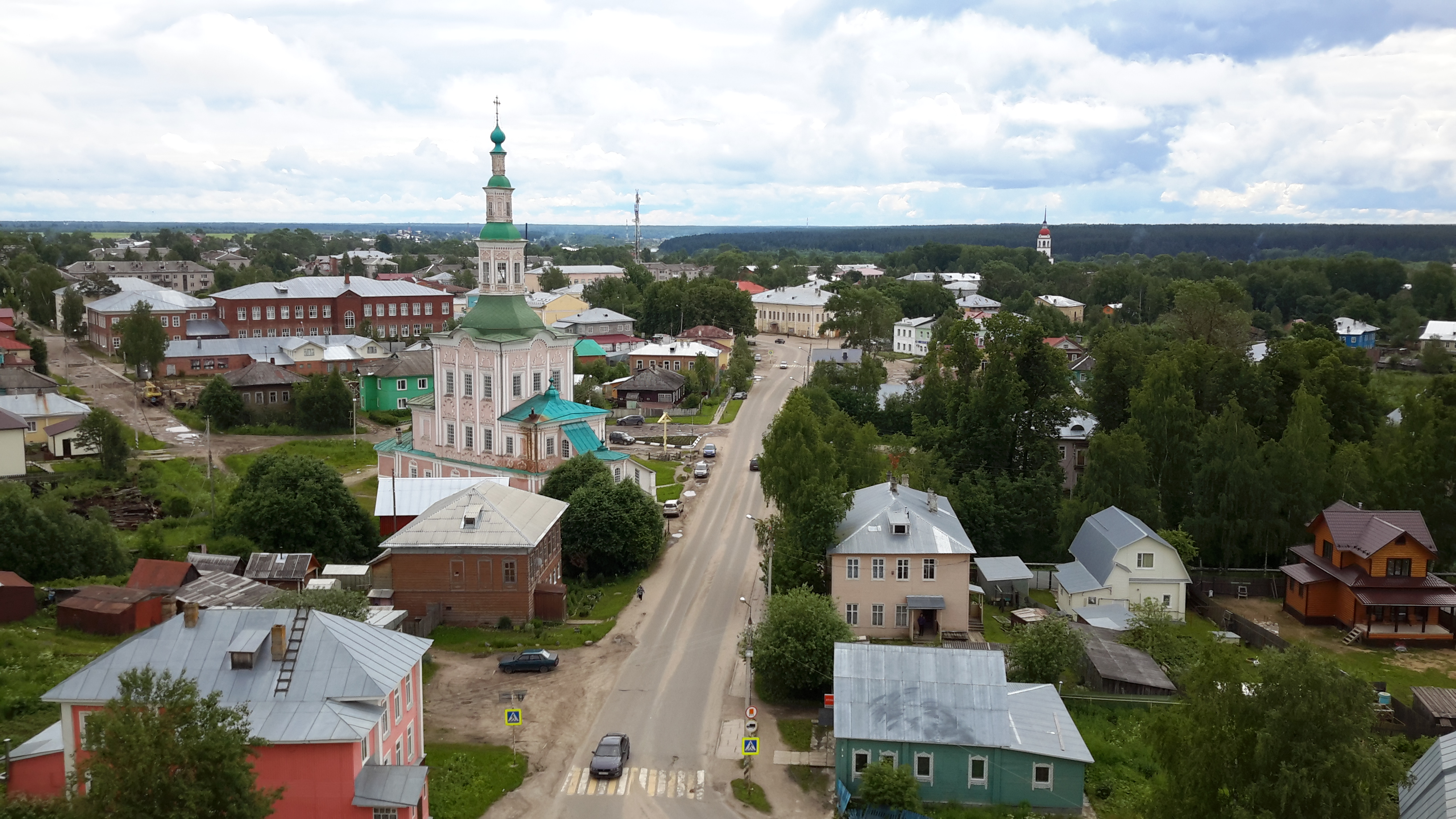
- Lenin (Kirov) Street in Totma

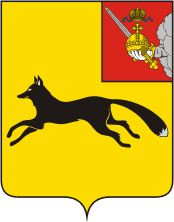
- Flag Coat of arms
- Interactive map of Totma
- Location of Totma Totma (Vologda Oblast)
- Coordinates: 59°58′N 42°45′E
- Country: Russia
- Federal subject: Vologda Oblast
- Administrative district: Totemsky District
- Town of district significanceSelsoviet: Totma
- First mentioned: 1137 or 1138
- Elevation: 130 m (430 ft)

Population (2010 Census)
  - Total: 9,785
  - Estimate (2023): 8,647 (−11.6%)

Administrative status
  - Capital of: Totemsky District, town of district significance of Totma

Municipal status
  - Municipal district: Totemsky Municipal District
  - Urban settlement: Totma Urban Settlement
  - Capital of: Totemsky Municipal District, Totma Urban Settlement
- Time zone: UTC+3 (MSK)
- Postal code: 161300
- OKTMO ID: 19646101001

Totma (Russian: То́тьма) is a town and the administrative center of Totemsky District in Vologda Oblast, Russia, located on the left bank of the Sukhona River at its confluence with the Pesya Denga, 217 kilometers (135 mi) northeast of Vologda, the administrative center of the oblast. Population: 9,785 (2010 census); 10,531 (2002 census); 10,622 (1989 Soviet census).

== History ==
It was first mentioned in the chronicles in 1137 (according to other sources—in 1138) as the pogost of Todma (Тодма). It was founded by Novgorodians, who used the Sukhona as the main waterway leading to the north and eventually to the White Sea. The name "Totma" is nevertheless of Finno-Ugrian origin, which, together with archeological discoveries, indicates that an earlier settlement on the site of the present town was established by the Merya people. The original pogost was located 16 kilometers (9.9 mi) downstream of the current location, close to the mouth of the Staraya Totma River. In the 13th century, salt production started around Totma and the town was relocated. In 1539, Totma was plundered by Kazan Tatars; a fortress was built after this event. In 1554, monk Feodosy Sumorin founded the Transfiguration Monastery. In the 16th–17th centuries, Totma was one of the most prosperous towns of the Russian North, due to the trade and to the salt production. In the 17th and 18th centuries, Totma was visited several times by Peter the Great, which was rather exceptional given the remote location of the town.

In the course of the administrative reform carried out in 1708 by Peter the Great, Totma was included into Archangelgorod Governorate and named one of the towns constituting the governorate. In the 18th century, Totma was one of the main centers of the exploration of and the trade with Alaska. In particular, Ivan Kuskov, the first administrator of Fort Ross, a Russian fortress in California, was a native of Totma. In 1780, Totma became the seat of Totemsky Uyezd of Vologda Viceroyalty, and since 1796 it was a part of Vologda Governorate.

In the 19th century, Totma quickly lost its significance as the foreign trade was rerouted from Arkhangelsk to St. Petersburg and the river transportation was gradually replaced by railways and highways. The railway from Vologda to Arkhangelsk was constructed along the shortest way via Konosha and bypassed Totma, while the old highway from Moscow to Arkhangelsk never ran via Totma. Until the late 1990s, the only road through Totma connected Vologda with Veliky Ustyug via Nikolsk. In the second half of the 19th century, Totma was frequently used as a destination for political exile.

On July 15, 1929, several governorates, including Vologda Governorate, were merged into Northern Krai and the uyezds were abolished. Totma became the administrative center of Totemsky District, which included parts of former Totemsky Uyezd.

== Administrative and municipal status ==
Within the framework of administrative divisions, Totma serves as the administrative center of Totemsky District. As an administrative division, it is incorporated within Totemsky District as the town of district significance of Totma. As a municipal division, the town of district significance of Totma is incorporated within Totemsky Municipal District as Totma Urban Settlement.

== Geography ==
=== Climate ===
Climate data for Totma (extremes 1883-present)
Month	Jan	Feb	Mar	Apr	May	Jun	Jul	Aug	Sep	Oct	Nov	Dec	Year
Record high °C (°F)	4.6 (40.3)	5.0 (41.0)	15.3 (59.5)	27.1 (80.8)	31.0 (87.8)	34.4 (93.9)	35.2 (95.4)	35.2 (95.4)	28.2 (82.8)	22.5 (72.5)	12.6 (54.7)	7.4 (45.3)	35.2 (95.4)
Mean daily maximum °C (°F)	−7.8 (18.0)	−6.0 (21.2)	0.4 (32.7)	8.7 (47.7)	16.7 (62.1)	20.8 (69.4)	23.4 (74.1)	20.2 (68.4)	13.9 (57.0)	5.8 (42.4)	−1.6 (29.1)	−5.6 (21.9)	7.4 (45.3)
Daily mean °C (°F)	−10.8 (12.6)	−9.6 (14.7)	−4.0 (24.8)	3.3 (37.9)	10.6 (51.1)	15.1 (59.2)	17.8 (64.0)	14.8 (58.6)	9.5 (49.1)	3.1 (37.6)	−3.7 (25.3)	−8.1 (17.4)	3.2 (37.7)
Mean daily minimum °C (°F)	−13.9 (7.0)	−12.9 (8.8)	−8.1 (17.4)	−1.4 (29.5)	4.9 (40.8)	9.5 (49.1)	12.4 (54.3)	10.2 (50.4)	6.0 (42.8)	1.0 (33.8)	−5.7 (21.7)	−10.8 (12.6)	−0.7 (30.7)
Record low °C (°F)	−45.3 (−49.5)	−42.7 (−44.9)	−35.6 (−32.1)	−26.3 (−15.3)	−10.7 (12.7)	−3.9 (25.0)	−1.4 (29.5)	−2.2 (28.0)	−7.0 (19.4)	−22.2 (−8.0)	−35.9 (−32.6)	−45.8 (−50.4)	−45.8 (−50.4)
Average precipitation mm (inches)	46.3 (1.82)	35.2 (1.39)	34.8 (1.37)	33.6 (1.32)	45.0 (1.77)	67.8 (2.67)	75.1 (2.96)	71.6 (2.82)	52.1 (2.05)	62.0 (2.44)	52.1 (2.05)	46.6 (1.83)	622.2 (24.49)
Source: pogoda.ru.net

== Economy ==
=== Industry ===
The most important industry in Totma is the food industry.

=== Transportation ===
Paved roads connect Totma with Vologda via Kadnikov (southwest), Veliky Ustyug via Nyuksenitsa (northeast), and Nikolsk via Imeni Babushkina (east). Before the road between Totma and Veliky Ustyug along the Sukhona was completed in the first decade of the 2000s, the only connection between the towns was via Nikolsk.

The Sukhona is navigable in Totma; however, there is no passenger navigation.

== Culture and recreation ==
Totma is a historical town which preserved, along with other heritage, several churches which have all similar structure not related to any other region of Russia. A Totma church is a building on which the church proper is based on one side and the bell-tower on the other side so that the construction reminds a ship. This style is sometimes referred to as Totma Baroque.

Totma contains twelve objects classified as cultural and historical heritage by Russian Federal law and additionally seventy-four objects classified as cultural and historical heritage of local importance. The town of Totma is classified as a historical town by the Ministry of Culture of Russian Federation, which implies certain restrictions on construction in the historical center.

The monuments classified as cultural heritage by the federal law are the following:

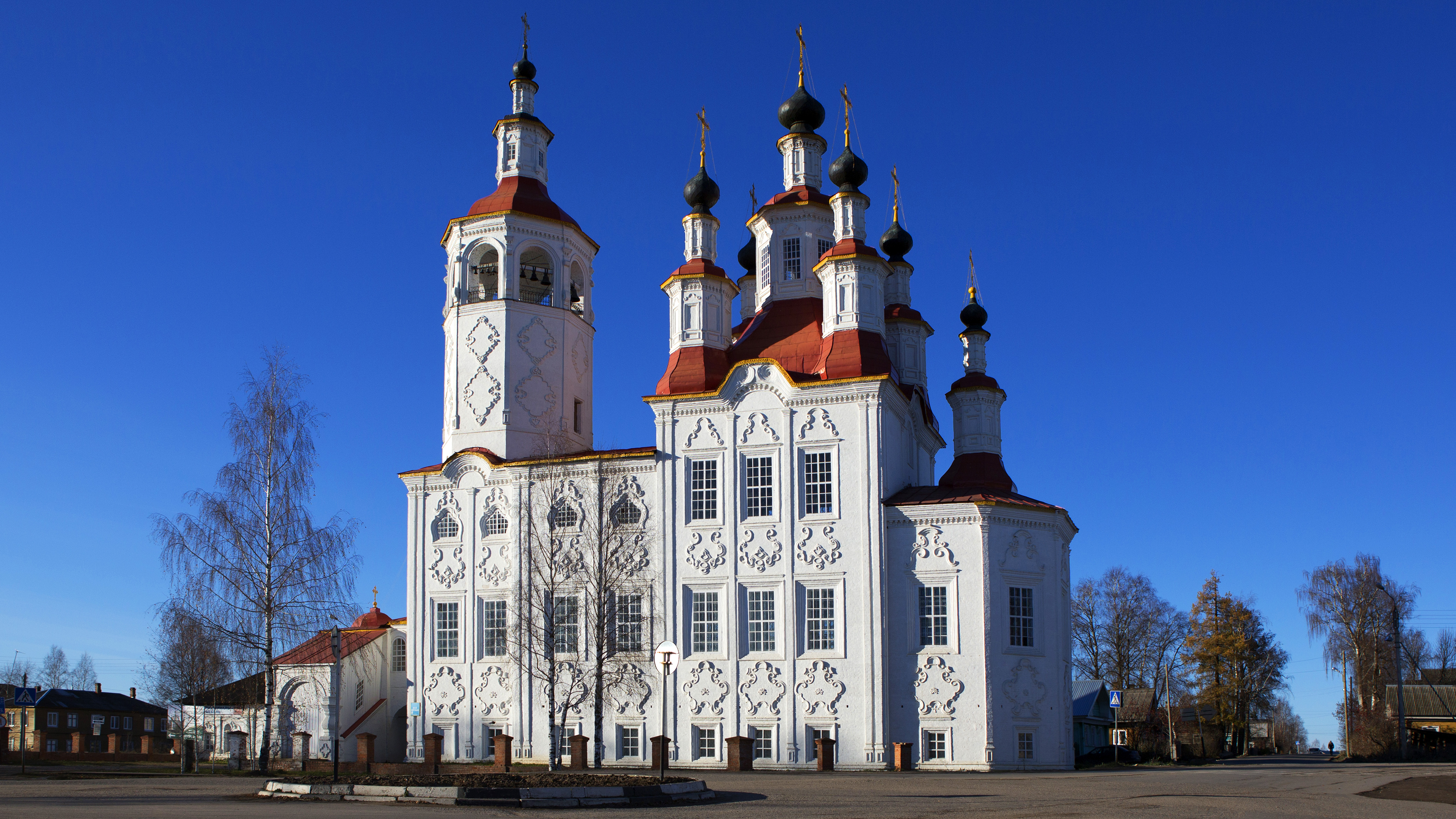
The Church of the Entry into Jerusalem

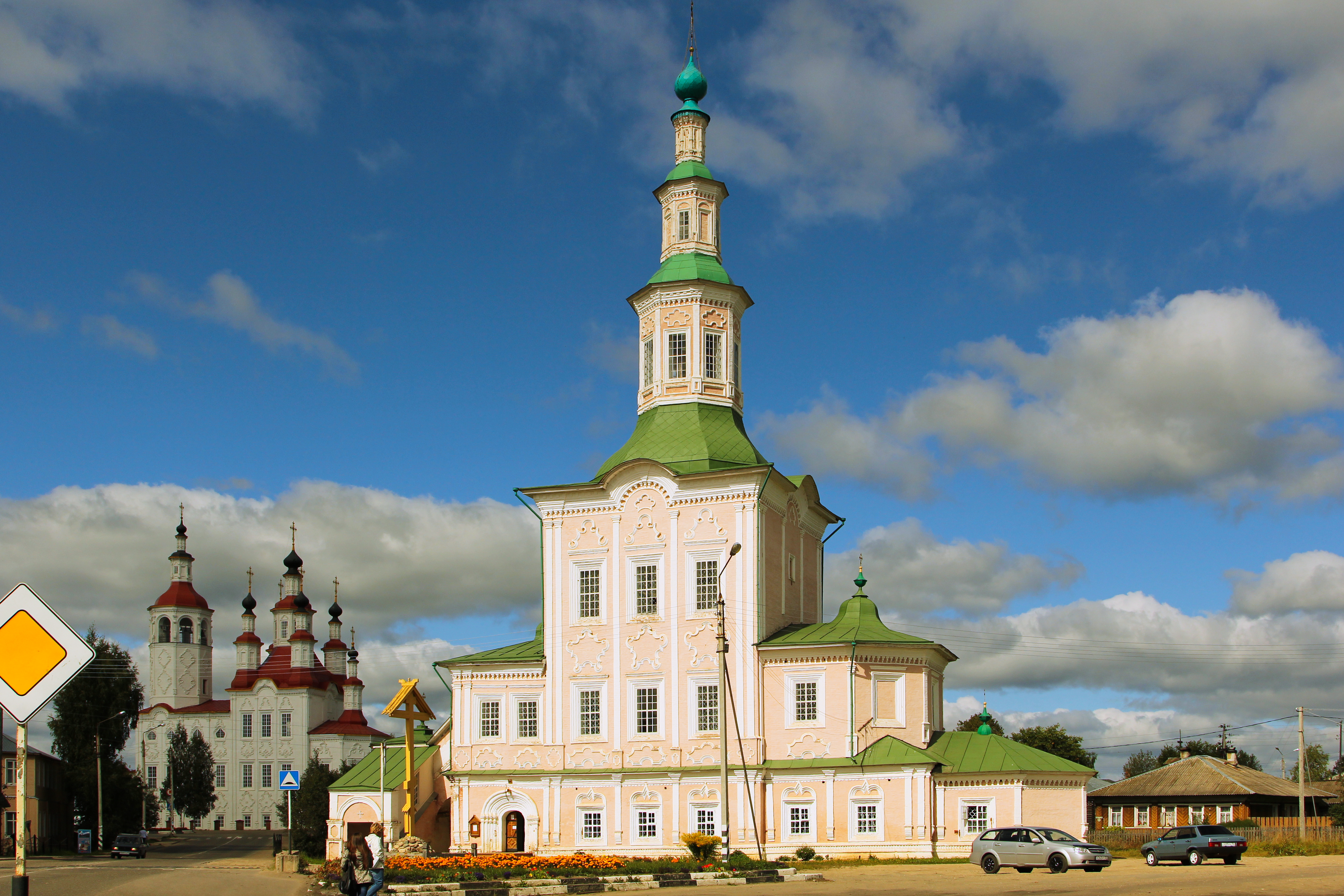
Church of the Nativity of Christ

- The complex of the Resurrection Church and the Assumption Church (1744–1755)
- The Nativity Church (1746–1748)
- The Trinity Church in Zelenskaya Rybatskaya Sloboda (1768–1772)
- The complex of the Church of the Entry into Jerusalem and the Church of St. John the Baptist (1738–1740)
- The Kholodilov House (middle of 19th century)
- The ensemble of Spaso-Sumorin Monastery (1685–1689)
- The town hall
- The house where Anatoly Lunacharsky lived in 1903-1904

Totma hosts five six museums:

- The Totma Regional Museum, founded in 1915. Feodosy Vakhrushov, a landscape painter, was the founder of the museum, and the museum presents a display of his paintings
- The museum of Church Antiquities
- The House of Ivan Kuskov
- The museum of Sea Explorers (in the building of the Church of the Entry into Jerusalem)
- The museum of artifacts in Spaso-Sumorin Monastery
- The Ship-Building Museum
