= Frolovo (inhabited locality) =

Frolovo (Russian: Фролово) is the name of several inhabited localities in Russia.

== Kaluga Oblast ==
As of 2010, five rural localities in Kaluga Oblast bear this name:

- Frolovo (Sovkhoz imeni Lenina Rural Settlement), Dzerzhinsky District, Kaluga Oblast, a village in Dzerzhinsky District; municipally, a part of Sovkhoz imeni Lenina Rural Settlement of that district
- Frolovo (Redkino Rural Settlement), Dzerzhinsky District, Kaluga Oblast, a village in Dzerzhinsky District; municipally, a part of Redkino Rural Settlement of that district
- Frolovo, Khvastovichsky District, Kaluga Oblast, a selo in Khvastovichsky District
- Frolovo (Frolovo Rural Settlement), Sukhinichsky District, Kaluga Oblast, a selo in Sukhinichsky District; municipally, a part of Frolovo Rural Settlement of that district
- Frolovo (Verkhovaya Rural Settlement), Sukhinichsky District, Kaluga Oblast, a selo in Sukhinichsky District; municipally, a part of Verkhovaya Rural Settlement of that district

== Kirov Oblast ==
As of 2010, one rural locality in Kirov Oblast bears this name:

- Frolovo, Kirov Oblast, a village in Mikheyevsky Rural Okrug of Lebyazhsky District

== Kostroma Oblast ==
As of 2010, four rural localities in Kostroma Oblast bear this name:

- Frolovo, Buysky District, Kostroma Oblast, a village in Tsentralnoye Settlement of Buysky District
- Frolovo, Makaryevsky District, Kostroma Oblast, a village in Nezhitinskoye Settlement of Makaryevsky District
- Frolovo, Manturovsky District, Kostroma Oblast, a village in Podvigalikhinskoye Settlement of Manturovsky District
- Frolovo, Soligalichsky District, Kostroma Oblast, a village in Burdukovskoye Settlement of Soligalichsky District

== Moscow Oblast ==
As of 2010, one rural locality in Moscow Oblast bears this name:

- Frolovo, Moscow Oblast, a village under the administrative jurisdiction of the City of Sergiyev Posad in Sergiyevo-Posadsky District

== Perm Krai ==
As of 2010, one rural locality in Perm Krai bears this name:

- Frolovo, Perm Krai, a village in Karagaysky District

== Pskov Oblast ==
As of 2010, three rural localities in Pskov Oblast bear this name:

- Frolovo, Nevelsky District, Pskov Oblast, a village in Nevelsky District
- Frolovo, Porkhovsky District, Pskov Oblast, a village in Porkhovsky District
- Frolovo, Pustoshkinsky District, Pskov Oblast, a village in Pustoshkinsky District

== Ryazan Oblast ==
As of 2010, five rural localities in Ryazan Oblast bear this name:

- Frolovo, Chuchkovsky District, Ryazan Oblast, a selo in Protasyevo-Uglyansky Rural Okrug of Chuchkovsky District
- Frolovo, Klepikovsky District, Ryazan Oblast, a village in Ushmorsky Rural Okrug of Klepikovsky District
- Frolovo, Korablinsky District, Ryazan Oblast, a village in Pekhletsky Rural Okrug of Korablinsky District
- Frolovo, Ryazansky District, Ryazan Oblast, a village in Shevtsovsky Rural Okrug of Ryazansky District
- Frolovo, Shilovsky District, Ryazan Oblast, a village in Mosolovsky Rural Okrug of Shilovsky District

== Smolensk Oblast ==
As of 2010, four rural localities in Smolensk Oblast bear this name:

- Frolovo, Dukhovshchinsky District, Smolensk Oblast, a village in Babinskoye Rural Settlement of Dukhovshchinsky District
- Frolovo, Khislavichsky District, Smolensk Oblast, a settlement under the administrative jurisdiction of Khislavichskoye Urban Settlement of Khislavichsky District
- Frolovo, Roslavlsky District, Smolensk Oblast, a village in Perenskoye Rural Settlement of Roslavlsky District
- Frolovo, Ugransky District, Smolensk Oblast, a village in Poldnevskoye Rural Settlement of Ugransky District

== Tver Oblast ==
As of 2010, ten rural localities in Tver Oblast bear this name:

- Frolovo, Belsky District, Tver Oblast, a village in Belsky District
- Frolovo (Shepelevskoye Rural Settlement), Kashinsky District, Tver Oblast, a village in Kashinsky District; municipally, a part of Shepelevskoye Rural Settlement of that district
- Frolovo (Karabuzinskoye Rural Settlement), Kashinsky District, Tver Oblast, a village in Kashinsky District; municipally, a part of Karabuzinskoye Rural Settlement of that district
- Frolovo, Kesovogorsky District, Tver Oblast, a village in Kesovogorsky District
- Frolovo, Kimrsky District, Tver Oblast, a village in Kimrsky District
- Frolovo, Konakovsky District, Tver Oblast, a village in Konakovsky District
- Frolovo, Oleninsky District, Tver Oblast, a village in Oleninsky District
- Frolovo, Rzhevsky District, Tver Oblast, a village in Rzhevsky District
- Frolovo, Selizharovsky District, Tver Oblast, a village in Selizharovsky District
- Frolovo, Zapadnodvinsky District, Tver Oblast, a village in Zapadnodvinsky District

== Volgograd Oblast ==
As of 2010, one urban locality in Volgograd Oblast bears this name:

- Frolovo, a town administratively incorporated as the town of oblast significance

== Vologda Oblast ==
As of 2010, five rural localities in Vologda Oblast bear this name:

- Frolovo, Shchetinsky Selsoviet, Cherepovetsky District, Vologda Oblast, a village in Shchetinsky Selsoviet of Cherepovetsky District
- Frolovo, Voskresensky Selsoviet, Cherepovetsky District, Vologda Oblast, a village in Voskresensky Selsoviet of Cherepovetsky District
- Frolovo, Mezhdurechensky District, Vologda Oblast, a village in Nozemsky Selsoviet of Mezhdurechensky District
- Frolovo, Sokolsky District, Vologda Oblast, a village in Chuchkovsky Selsoviet of Sokolsky District
- Frolovo, Totemsky District, Vologda Oblast, a village in Verkhnetolshmensky Selsoviet of Totemsky District

== Yaroslavl Oblast ==
As of 2010, two rural localities in Yaroslavl Oblast bear this name:

- Frolovo, Borisoglebsky District, Yaroslavl Oblast, a village in Pokrovsky Rural Okrug of Borisoglebsky District
- Frolovo, Lyubimsky District, Yaroslavl Oblast, a village in Kirillovsky Rural Okrug of Lyubimsky District
