= Yermolino (inhabited locality) =

Yermolino (Russian: Ермолино) is the name of several inhabited localities in Russia:

== Modern localities ==
=== Ivanovo Oblast ===
As of 2012, one rural locality in Ivanovo Oblast bears this name:

- Yermolino, Ivanovo Oblast, a selo in Furmanovsky District

=== Kaluga Oblast ===
As of 2012, one urban locality in Kaluga Oblast bears this name:

- Yermolino, Kaluga Oblast, a town in Borovsky District

=== Kostroma Oblast ===
As of 2012, two rural localities in Kostroma Oblast bear this name:

- Yermolino, Antropovsky District, Kostroma Oblast, a village in Prosekskoye Settlement of Antropovsky District; 58°32′N 42°56′E
- Yermolino, Buysky District, Kostroma Oblast, a village in Tsentralnoye Settlement of Buysky District; 58°38′N 41°16′E

=== Leningrad Oblast ===
As of 2012, one rural locality in Leningrad Oblast bears this name:

- Yermolino, Leningrad Oblast, a village in Yelizavetinskoye Settlement Municipal Formation of Gatchinsky District; 59°30′N 29°42′E

=== Moscow Oblast ===
As of 2012, five rural localities in Moscow Oblast bear this name:

- Yermolino, Dmitrovsky District, Moscow Oblast, a village under the administrative jurisdiction of Iksha Work Settlement in Dmitrovsky District
- Yermolino, Istrinsky District, Moscow Oblast, a village in Yermolinskoye Rural Settlement of Istrinsky District
- Yermolino, Leninsky District, Moscow Oblast, a selo under the administrative jurisdiction of the Town of Vidnoye in Leninsky District
- Yermolino, Solnechnogorsky District, Moscow Oblast, a village in Krivtsovskoye Rural Settlement of Solnechnogorsky District
- Yermolino, Taldomsky District, Moscow Oblast, a village in Yermolinskoye Rural Settlement of Taldomsky District

=== Nizhny Novgorod Oblast ===
As of 2012, two rural localities in Nizhny Novgorod Oblast bear this name:

- Yermolino, Lyskovsky District, Nizhny Novgorod Oblast, a selo in Kirikovsky Selsoviet of Lyskovsky District
- Yermolino, Sharangsky District, Nizhny Novgorod Oblast, a village in Rozhentsovsky Selsoviet of Sharangsky District

=== Novgorod Oblast ===
As of 2012, two rural localities in Novgorod Oblast bear this name:

- Yermolino, Novgorodsky District, Novgorod Oblast, a village in Yermolinskoye Settlement of Novgorodsky District
- Yermolino, Okulovsky District, Novgorod Oblast, a village in Borovenkovskoye Settlement of Okulovsky District

=== Omsk Oblast ===
As of 2012, one rural locality in Omsk Oblast bears this name:

- Yermolino, Omsk Oblast, a village in Troitsky Rural Okrug of Tyukalinsky District

=== Perm Krai ===
As of 2012, one rural locality in Perm Krai bears this name:

- Yermolino, Perm Krai, a village in Beryozovsky District

=== Pskov Oblast ===
As of 2012, one rural locality in Pskov Oblast bears this name:

- Yermolino, Pskov Oblast, a village in Bezhanitsky District

=== Smolensk Oblast ===
As of 2012, one rural locality in Smolensk Oblast bears this name:

- Yermolino, Smolensk Oblast, a village in Roslavlskoye Rural Settlement of Roslavlsky District

=== Tver Oblast ===
As of 2012, two rural localities in Tver Oblast bear this name:

- Yermolino, Firovsky District, Tver Oblast, a village in Rozhdestvenskoye Rural Settlement of Firovsky District
- Yermolino, Maksatikhinsky District, Tver Oblast, a village in Truzhenitskoye Rural Settlement of Maksatikhinsky District

=== Vladimir Oblast ===
As of 2012, one rural locality in Vladimir Oblast bears this name:

- Yermolino, Vladimir Oblast, a village in Petushinsky District

=== Vologda Oblast ===
As of 2012, four rural localities in Vologda Oblast bear this name:

- Yermolino, Chagodoshchensky District, Vologda Oblast, a village in Lukinsky Selsoviet of Chagodoshchensky District
- Yermolino, Gryazovetsky District, Vologda Oblast, a village in Rostilovsky Selsoviet of Gryazovetsky District
- Yermolino, Ust-Kubinsky District, Vologda Oblast, a village in Bogorodsky Selsoviet of Ust-Kubinsky District
- Yermolino, Vologodsky District, Vologda Oblast, a village in Kubensky Selsoviet of Vologodsky District

=== Yaroslavl Oblast ===
As of 2012, four rural localities in Yaroslavl Oblast bear this name:

- Yermolino, Borisoglebsky District, Yaroslavl Oblast, a village in Andreyevsky Rural Okrug of Borisoglebsky District
- Yermolino, Lyubimsky District, Yaroslavl Oblast, a village in Kirillovsky Rural Okrug of Lyubimsky District
- Yermolino, Pereslavsky District, Yaroslavl Oblast, a village in Perelessky Rural Okrug of Pereslavsky District
- Yermolino, Rybinsky District, Yaroslavl Oblast, a village in Nazarovsky Rural Okrug of Rybinsky District

== Abolished localities ==
- Yermolino, Parfenyevsky District, Kostroma Oblast, a village in Potrusovsky Selsoviet of Parfenyevsky District in Kostroma Oblast; abolished on October 18, 2004
