= Ermolao =

Ermolao is the Italian version of Greek masculine given name Ermolaos (Greek: Ἑρμόλαος), meaning "the people of Hermes". Notable people with the name include:

- Antonio Ermolao Paoletti (May 8, 1834, in Venice – December 13, 1912, in Venice) was an Italian painter
- Ermolao Barbaro (disambiguation)
- Ermolao Foscari

== See also ==
- Yermolay
- Hermolaus
- Ermolaos
