= Lyubim =

Town in Yaroslavl Oblast, Russia

Lyubim Любим
- Town
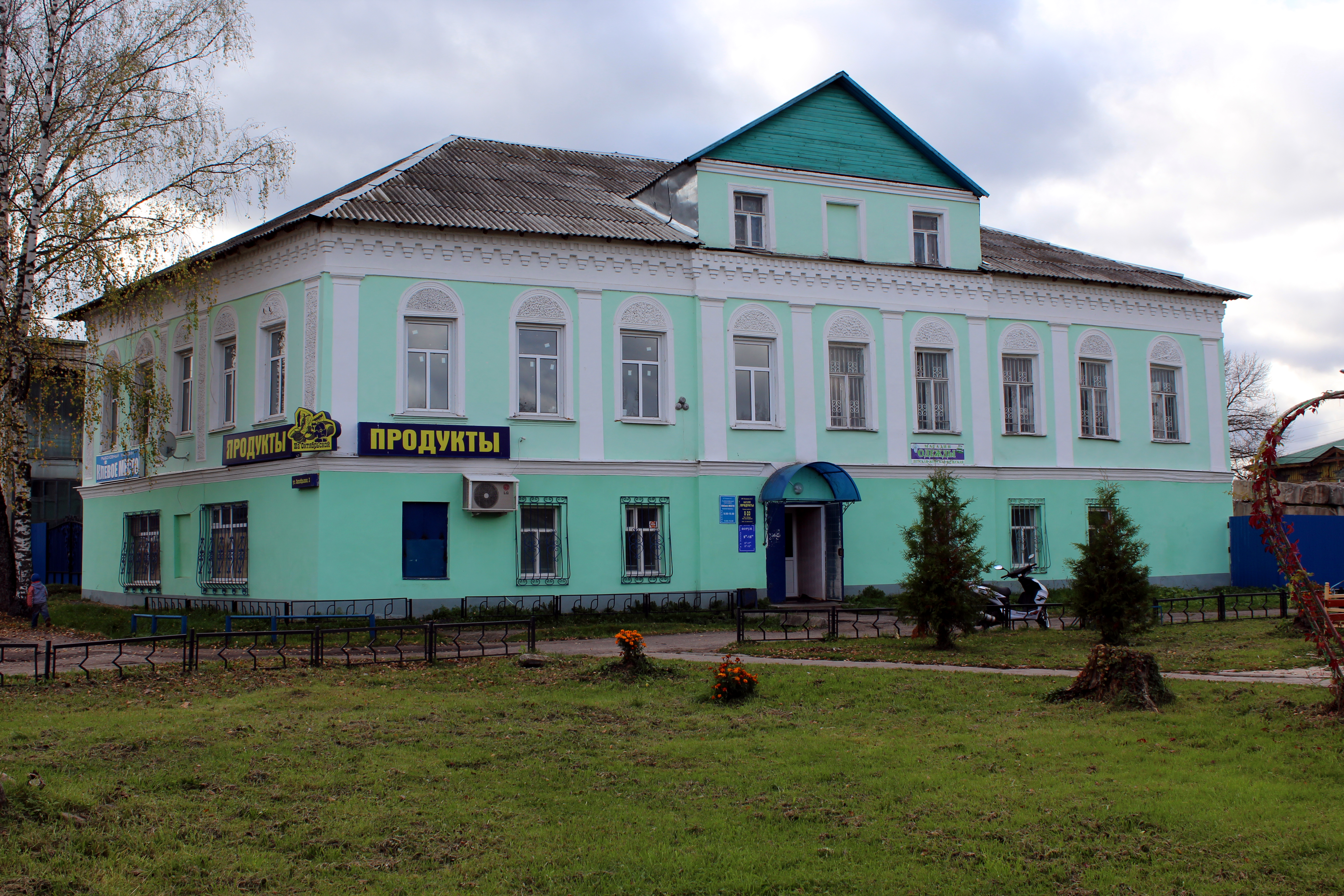

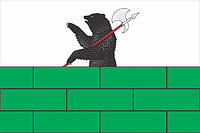
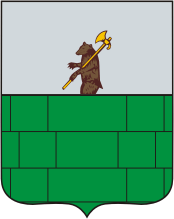
- Flag Coat of arms
- Interactive map of Lyubim
- Location of Lyubim Lyubim (Yaroslavl Oblast)
- Coordinates: 58°21′N 40°41′E
- Country: Russia
- Federal subject: Yaroslavl Oblast
- Administrative district: Lyubimsky District
- Town of district significanceSelsoviet: Lyubim
- Known since: 1546
- Town status since: 1777
- Elevation: 105 m (344 ft)

Population (2010 Census)
  - Total: 5,555
  - Estimate (1 January 2018): 5,076 (−8.6%)

Administrative status
  - Capital of: town of district significance of Lyubim

Municipal status
  - Municipal district: Lyubimsky Municipal District
  - Urban settlement: Lyubim Urban Settlement
  - Capital of: Lyubimsky Municipal District, Lyubim Urban Settlement
- Time zone: UTC+3 (MSK)
- Postal code: 152470
- OKTMO ID: 78618101001

Lyubim (Russian: Люби́м, IPA: [lʲʉˈbʲim]) is a town and the administrative center of Lyubimsky District in Yaroslavl Oblast, Russia, located by the Obnora River (a tributary of the Kostroma River). Population: 5,555 (2010 census); 6,254 (2002 census); 7,074 (1989 Soviet census).

== History ==
Known since 1546, it was granted town status in 1777.

== Administrative and municipal status ==
Within the framework of administrative divisions, Lyubim serves as the administrative center of Lyubimsky District. As an administrative division, it is incorporated within Lyubimsky District as the town of district significance of Lyubim. As a municipal division, the town of district significance of Lyubim, together with Lyubimsky Rural Okrug (which comprises seventeen rural localities), is incorporated within Lyubimsky Municipal District as Lyubim Urban Settlement.

== Economy ==
Lyubim is home to a railway station and some wood-processing industry.

== Notable people ==
- Leokadiya Kashperova (1872 - 1940): Russian pianist and Romantic composer.
