= Shacha =

Shacha may refer to:

- Shacha (company), a media company based in Rotterdam, Netherlands
- Shacha (Kostroma Oblast), a river in Russia, tributary of the Kostroma
- Shacha (Ryazan Oblast), a river in Russia, tributary of the Tsna
- Shacha sauce, a savory Chinese condiment used in Fujian and Taiwanese cuisine

== See also ==
- Shacha®, a registered trademark owned by Shacha Media.
