= Yermolin =

Yermolin or Ermolin (Russian: Ермолин) is a Russian masculine surname originating from the Russian masculine given name Yermolay; its feminine counterpart is Yermolina or Ermolina. The surname may refer to the following notable people:

- Anatoly Yermolin
- Oleg Yermolin (born 1972), Russian luger
- Vasili Yermolin (died between 1481 and 1485), Russian architect and sculptor

== See also ==
- Yermolino (disambiguation)
