= Pavlo-Obnorsky Monastery =

Russian Orthodox monastery

Coordinates: 58°45′43″N 40°20′10″E

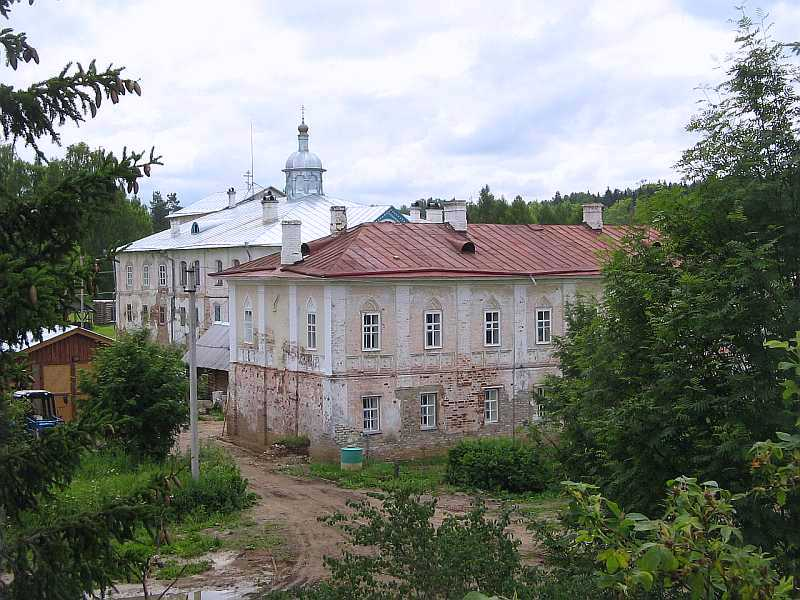
- General view of the monastery
- Interactive map of Pavlo-Obnorsky Monastery

Monastery information
- Full name: Павло-Обнорский монастырь
- Order: Russian Orthodox Church
- Established: 1414, 1994
- Disestablished: 1926
- Diocese: Vologda and Veliky Ustyug Eparchy

People
- Founder: Pavel of Obnora

Site
- Location: Yunosheskoye, Vologda Oblast, Russia
- Public access: Yes

Pavlo-Obnorsky Monastery (Russian: Павло-Обнорский монастырь) is a Russian Orthodox monastery founded by Pavel of Obnora in 1414. The monastery is located in the selo of Yunosheskoye on the bank of the Nurma River, a tributary of the Obnora River, in Gryazovetsky District in the southern part of Vologda Oblast, Russia. In the 17th century, this was one of the most influential monasteries in Russia. The monastery was abolished in 1924 and reestablished in 1994. As of 2011, it was one of the four active monasteries in Vologda Oblast.

== History ==
The monastery was founded by Pavel of Obnora. Pavel was looking for a remote place, and the area in the 15th century was covered by dense forests. The rules of the monastery were very strict by Russian standards. The first hegumen of the monastery was Alexios, a disciple of Pavel, and Pavel himself never took any formal role in the monastery. Some of the icons by Dionisius, one of the most famous Russian icon painters, were made in the monastery and have been preserved in the Tretyakov Gallery in Moscow. In 1538, the monastery was destroyed by Tatars. It was rebuilt, and the existing ensemble of the monastery was formed in the 16th to 18th centuries. The idea was to build an image of New Jerusalem. To this end, two artificial hills were erected, one with a church and another one with a chapel. The monastery was abolished in 1924. The buildings were used to host a school, an orphanage, and a sanatorium. It was reestablished in 1994 as a metochion of the Spaso-Prilutsky Monastery. In 2003, the Pavlo-Obnorsky Monastery became an independent entity.

== Architecture ==
The ensemble of the monastery was essentially neglected after the monastery was abolished in 1926. Restoration works started in the 1990s. The ensemble consists of

- The Assumption Church (1867);
- The Resurrection Church, built in 1862 as a skete about 300 metres (980 ft) from the monastery complex;
- The wooden Chapel of St. Pavel of Obnora (contemporary);
- The wooden Chapel of St. Pavel of Obnora at the spring (contemporary);

and the cells. The Trinity Church, built between 1505 and 1516, has been demolished.

The ensemble of the monastery, as well as separate buildings, are protected as cultural monuments of local significance.

== Gallery ==
=== Monastery in the 20th century ===
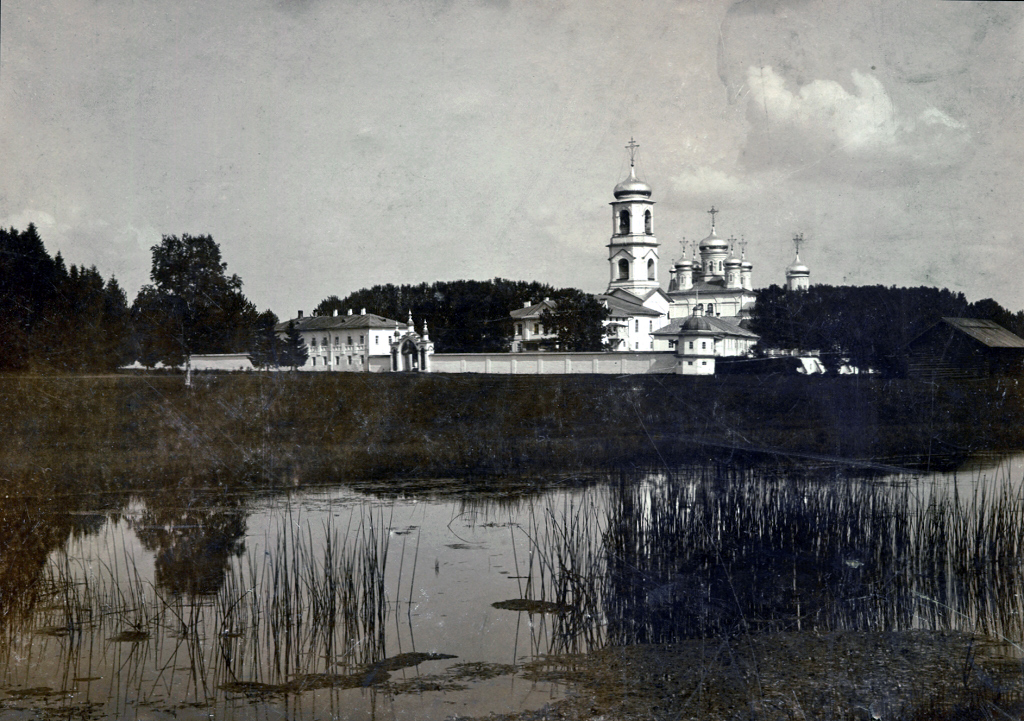
1917

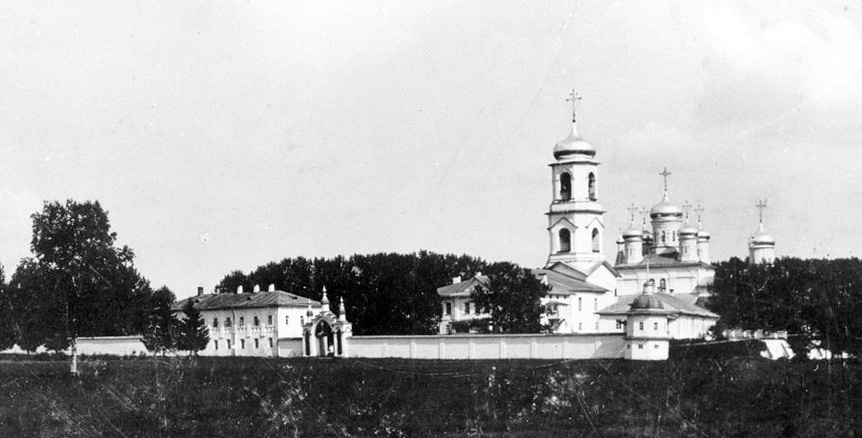
1900

=== The Assumption Church ===
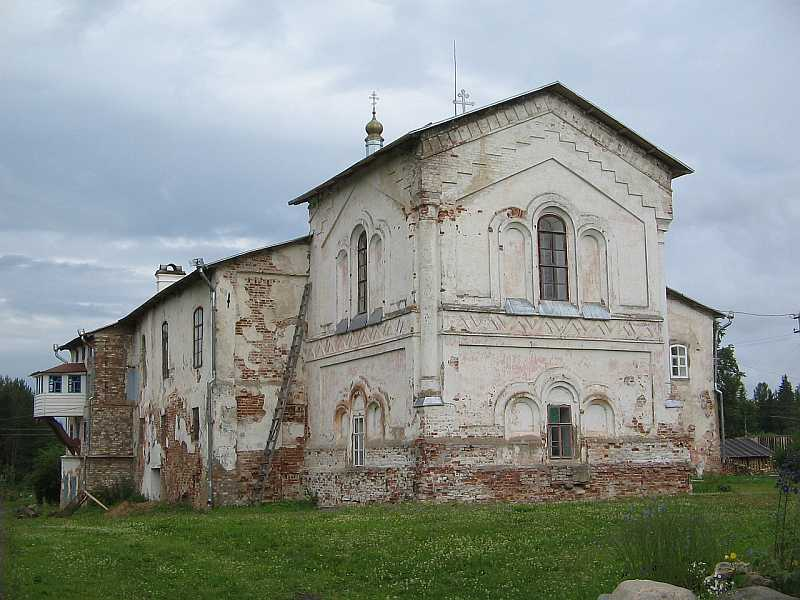
The Assumption Church with a former refectory

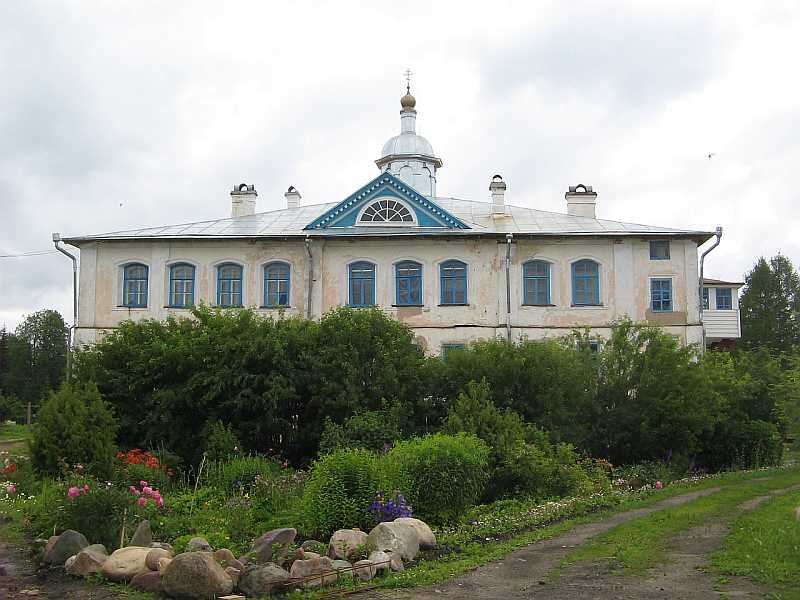
The Abbot's building attached to the Assumption Church

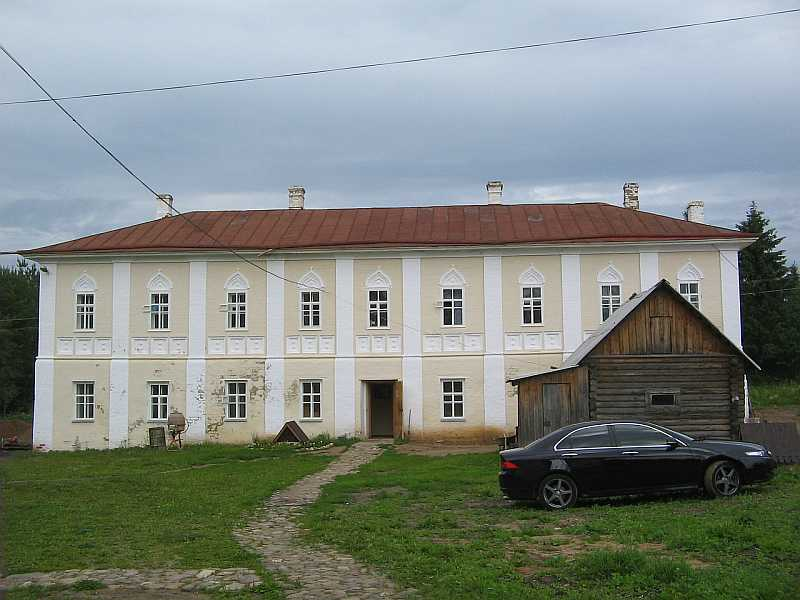
Fraternal building, view from the monastery territory
