= Yermolenko =

Yermolenko, also transliterated Ermolenko (Ukrainian: Єрмоленко; Russian: Ермоленко) is a Ukrainian surname der4ived from the given name Yermol, Yermolay. Its Belarusian equivalent is Yarmolenka/Jarmolienka (Belarusian: Ярмоленка).

== People ==
=== Yermolenko ===
- Maksym Yermolenko (born 1998), Ukrainian footballer
- Ruslan Yermolenko (born 1983), Ukrainian footballer
- Sergey Yermolenko (born 1972), Belarusian footballer and coach
- Yury Yermolenko (born 1967), Russian sport shooter

=== Ermolenko ===
- Charles Ermolenko (born 1968), American speedway rider
- Natalia Ermolenko-Yuzhina (1881–1937), Ukrainian opera singer
- Sam Ermolenko (born 1960), American speedway rider

=== Yarmolenka ===
- Karyna Yarmolenka (born 2000), Belarusian rhythmic gymnast

== See also ==
- Yarmolenko
