= Yermilov =

Yermilov, Yermylov, Ermylov or Ermilov (Russian: Ермилов) is a Slavic masculine surname, its feminine counterpart is Yermilova, Yermylova, Ermylova or Ermilova. It may refer to

- Aleksandr Ermilov (born 1954), Russian volleyball player
- Aleksandr Yermilov (born 1960), Russian flatwater kayaker and sprint canoer
- Vasyl Yermylov (1894–1968), Ukrainian painter
- Vitali Yermilov (born 1970), Russian football player

== See also ==
- Yermolov (disambiguation)
