= Yermolyev =

Yermolyev, Ermolieff or Ermolyev (Russian: Ермольев) is a Russian masculine surname originating from the Russian masculine given name Yermolay; its feminine counterpart is Yermolyeva or Ermolyeva. The surname may refer to the following notable people:

- Joseph N. Ermolieff (1889–1962), Russian-born film producer
- Viktoriya Yermolyeva (born 1978), Ukrainian-German pianist
- Zinaida Yermolyeva (1898–1974), Soviet microbiologist
