= Yermolay =

Russian masculine given name

Yermolay (Russian: Ермолай) is a Russian masculine given name. It is also written as Ermolai, Ermolay, and Yermolai.

Yermolay is derived from the Greek Ἑρμόλαος (Hermolaos), meaning "the people of Hermes".

Diminutives of the name include Yermolayka (Ермолайка); Yermola (Ермола); Yerma (Ерма); Yermokha (Ермоха); Yermosha (Ермоша). It is the basis of patronymic surnames Yarmolenko, Yermolayev, Yermolenko, Yermolin, Yermolkin, Yermolov, Yermolyev, Yermoshin.

== Notable people ==
People with the given name Yermolay include:

- Ermolai-Erazm, 16th-century Russian churchman and writer
- Yermolay Gamper, 1750–1814, Russian major general of the Napoleonic Wars
- Yermolay Kern (1773–1841) Russian general of the Napoleonic Wars

== Fictional characters ==
- Yermolay Alekseyevich Lopakhin, a character in The Cherry Orchard by Anton Chekhov
- "Yermolay and the Miller's Wife", a story from Ivan Turgenev's A Sportsman's Sketches
- Yermolay, a character in the 1979 Soviet film Siberiade.

== See also ==
- Hermolaus
- Ermolao
- Ermolaos
