= Hermolaus =

Hermolaus is the Latinized Greek masculine given name Ermolaos (Greek: Ἑρμόλαος), meaning "the people of Hermes". The name was translated into other languages as well, e.g., Yermolay (Russian), and Ermolao (Italian).

Notable people with the given name include:

- Saint Hermolaus of Nicomedia (d. 303)
- Hermolaus Barbarus (21 May 1454 – 14 June 1493), was a Venetian Renaissance humanist, diplomat and churchman
- Hermolaus of Macedon, page to Alexander the Great
- Hermolaus of Constantinople, grammarian. He wrote an epitome of the Ethnica by Stephanus of Byzantium.
