= Yunosheskoye =

Village in Vologda Oblast, Russia

Yunosheskoye Юношеское
- Selo
- Etymology: youth (Russian: юность)
- Location within Vologda Oblast Location within Russia
- Coordinates: 58°45′N 40°20′E
- Country: Russia
- Region: Vologda Oblast
- District: Gryazovetsky District

Population
  - Total: 27
- (2010)
- Time zone: UTC+3:00

Yunosheskoye (Russian: Юношеское) is a selo (rural locality) in Rostilovskoye Rural Settlement, Gryazovetsky District, Vologda Oblast, Russia. The population was 27 as of 2010.

== Geography ==
Yunosheskoye is located 16 km southeast of the district's administrative centre Gryazovets by road. Yermolino is the nearest village.

== History ==
The modern name was given in 1924.
