= Ivan Sytin =

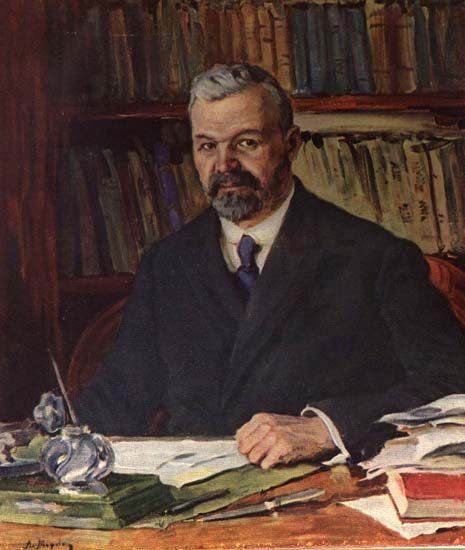
Ivan Sytin in 1908; portrait by Alexander Moravov (1878-1951)

Ivan Dmitrievich Sytin (Russian: Ива́н Дми́триевич Сы́тин; 5 February 1851 – 23 November 1934) was a publisher in the Russian Empire. The son of a Soligalich peasant, he built the largest publishing house in the Russian Empire.

Sytin went from his village to Moscow at the age of 13 and opened his own book shop in 1883. He made a fortune through printing millions of almanac-type calendars containing miscellaneous practical information. They were cheap and attractively illustrated.

This venture was followed by the very cheap editions of Pushkin's, Gogol's and Tolstoy's works. After their authors' rights expired, Sytin compressed their entire works into one volume that cost as little as 90 kopecks. He was the first publisher to reach the peasants all over Russia and to shape popular taste in the entire country.

Maxim Gorky called Sytin the de facto "minister of people's education" whose calendars and leaflets "cut down at least by half the number of relapses into illiteracy".

Leo Tolstoy proposed to edit "a cheap, simplified series that would reflect his moral teachings and not be copyrighted".

Between 1887 and 1916, Sytin's printing house in Zamoskvorechye brought out more than 400 primers and textbooks. He later expanded into the publication of popular encyclopaedias such as The Military Encyclopaedia in eighteen volumes, The Encyclopaedia for Children in ten volumes, and the Napoleonic Wars encyclopaedia in seven volumes.

By the early 20th century, Sytin dominated the publishing industry in the Russian Empire. It was he who revived the Vokrug sveta geographic magazine (still published today). He commissioned numerous translations of adventure fiction by such authors as Jules Verne and H. G. Wells. Russkoye Slovo, an obscure conservative newspaper, was transformed by Sytin into Russia's most popular (and cheapest) daily; its circulation surpassed one million copies in 1917.

After the Russian Revolution, Sytin's printing house was nationalized but he decided against emigrating and died in obscurity in his small flat on Tverskaya Street at the age of 83. This apartment has been designated a national museum since 1989.

In 1990, McGill-Queen's University Press published a study by Charles A. Ruud, Russian Entrepreneur: Publisher Ivan Sytin of Moscow, 1851-1934.
