= Vyoksa =

- Native name: Вёкса (Russian)

Location
- Country: Russia

Physical characteristics
- Source: Lake Galichskoye
- Mouth: Kostroma
  - coordinates: 58.4784°N 41.5278°E
- Length: 84 km (52 mi)
- Basin size: 2,880 km^{2} (1,110 sq mi)

Basin features
- Progression: Kostroma→ Volga→ Caspian Sea

The Vyoksa (Russian: Вёкса) is a river running in the western part of the Kostroma Oblast in Central Russia. The river originates at the outflow of Lake Galichskoye. It drains into the Kostroma on the left bank in the town of Buy. It is 84 kilometres (52 mi) long, and has a drainage basin of 2,880 square kilometres (1,110 sq mi).
