= Yermolino =

Yermolino may refer to:

- Yermolino Urban Settlement, a municipal formation which the town of Yermolino in Borovsky District of Kaluga Oblast, Russia is incorporated as
- Yermolino (inhabited locality), several inhabited localities in Russia
- Yermolino Airport (ICAO: UUWE), an airport in Kaluga Oblast, Russia
