= Yarmolenko =

Yarmolenko (Ukrainian: Ярмоленко) is a Ukrainian surname. Its Belarusian equivalent is Yarmolenka/Jarmolienka (Belarusian: Ярмоленка) derived from the given name Yarmol (Yermolay). Notable people with the surname include:

- Andriy Yarmolenko (born 1989), Ukrainian footballer
- Artem Yarmolenko (born 1998), Ukrainian footballer
- Volha Yarmolenka (born 1976), Belarusian singer

== See also ==
- Yermolenko
