= Soligalich =

Town in Kostroma Oblast, Russia

Soligalich Солигалич
- Town
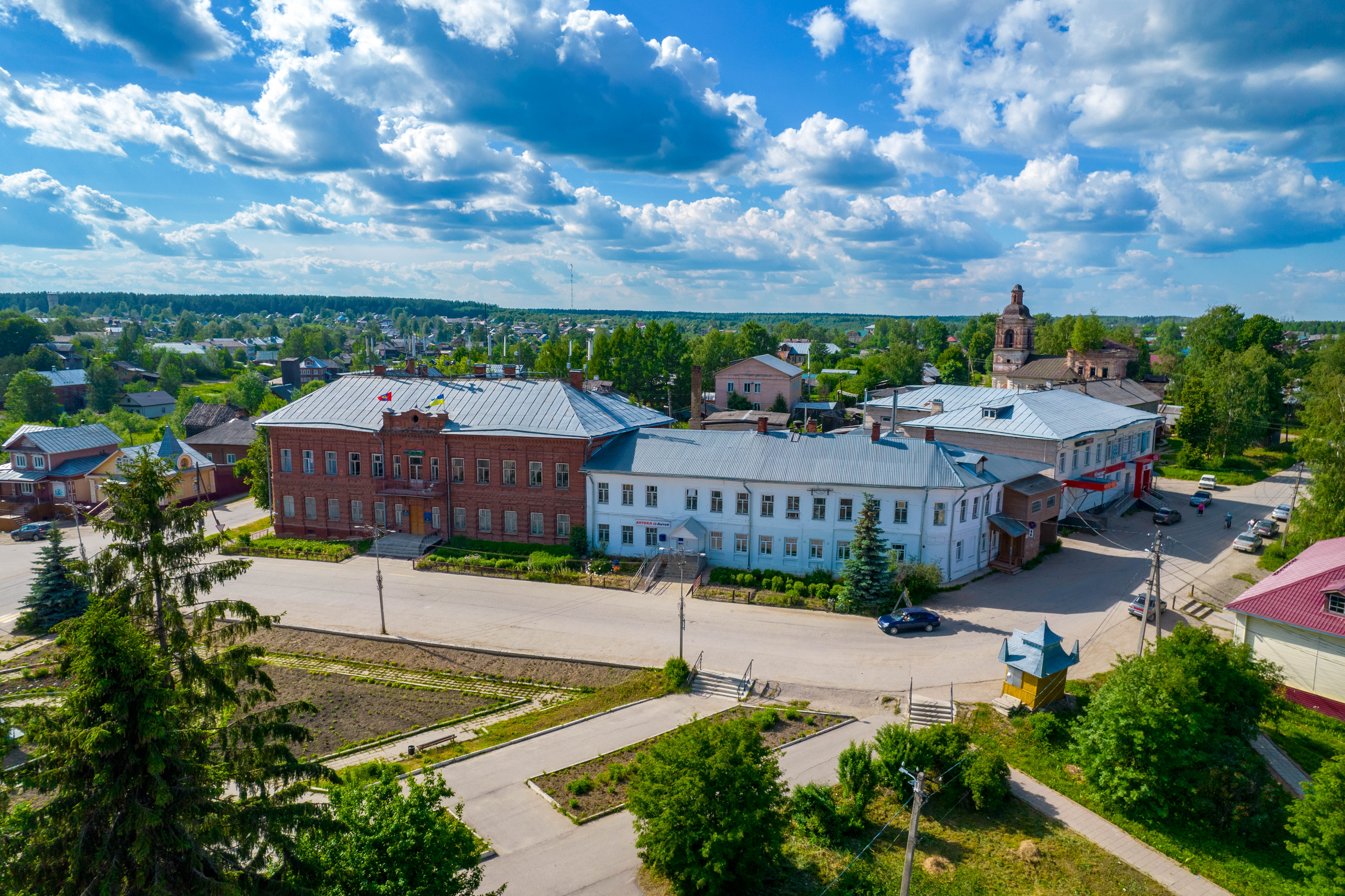
- View of Soligalich

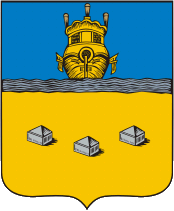
- Coat of arms
- Interactive map of Soligalich
- Location of Soligalich Soligalich (Kostroma Oblast)
- Coordinates: 59°05′N 42°17′E
- Country: Russia
- Federal subject: Kostroma Oblast
- Administrative district: Soligalichsky District
- Town of district significanceSelsoviet: Soligalich
- Founded: 1335
- Town status since: 1778
- Elevation: 130 m (430 ft)

Population (2010 Census)
  - Total: 6,438
  - Estimate (2021): 5,534 (−14%)

Administrative status
  - Capital of: Soligalichsky District, town of district significance of Soligalich

Municipal status
  - Municipal district: Soligalichsky Municipal District
  - Urban settlement: Soligalich Urban Settlement
  - Capital of: Soligalichsky Municipal District, Soligalich Urban Settlement
- Time zone: UTC+3 (MSK)
- Postal code: 157170
- Dialing code: +7 49436
- OKTMO ID: 34640101001

Soligalich (Russian: Солига́лич) is a town and the administrative center of Soligalichsky District in Kostroma Oblast, Russia, located on the right bank of the Kostroma River. Population: 6,438 (2010 census); 6,996 (2002 census); 7,456 (1989 Soviet census).

== History ==
It originated as an important center of saltworks, which supplied with salt not only Russia but also much of Scandinavia. These saltworks were first mentioned in the testament of Ivan Kalita as Sol-Galitskaya (Соль-Галицкая, lit. salt of Galich).

By the end of the 14th century, the saltworks passed to the family of Dmitry Shemyaka, providing him with income required to wage prolonged wars for control of Moscow. It was in 1450 that both Galich and Soligalich were finally seized by Vasily II of the Grand Duchy of Moscow.

In the 16th century, the saltworks were exploited by the Trinity Lavra of St. Sergius and five other monasteries. The settlement was repeatedly ravaged by Kazan Tatars and Udmurts.

In 1609, Soligalich became a voivode's seat. It was sacked by one of Polish units roaming Russia during the Time of Troubles. In 1649, the wooden town was destroyed by fire. Towards the end of the 17th century, half a dozen churches were rebuilt in brick, surviving to the present day.

In 1708, Soligalich became a part of Archangelgorod Governorate. Seven decades later, separate Kostroma Governorate was formed, with Soligalich as one of the uyezd centers.

== Administrative and municipal status ==
Within the framework of administrative divisions, Soligalich serves as the administrative center of Soligalichsky District. As an administrative division, it is incorporated within Soligalichsky District as the town of district significance of Soligalich. As a municipal division, the town of district significance of Soligalich is incorporated within Soligalichsky Municipal District as Soligalich Urban Settlement.

== Tourism ==
The town is known as a minor spa, for it has mineral springs, silt and mud baths.

== Gallery ==
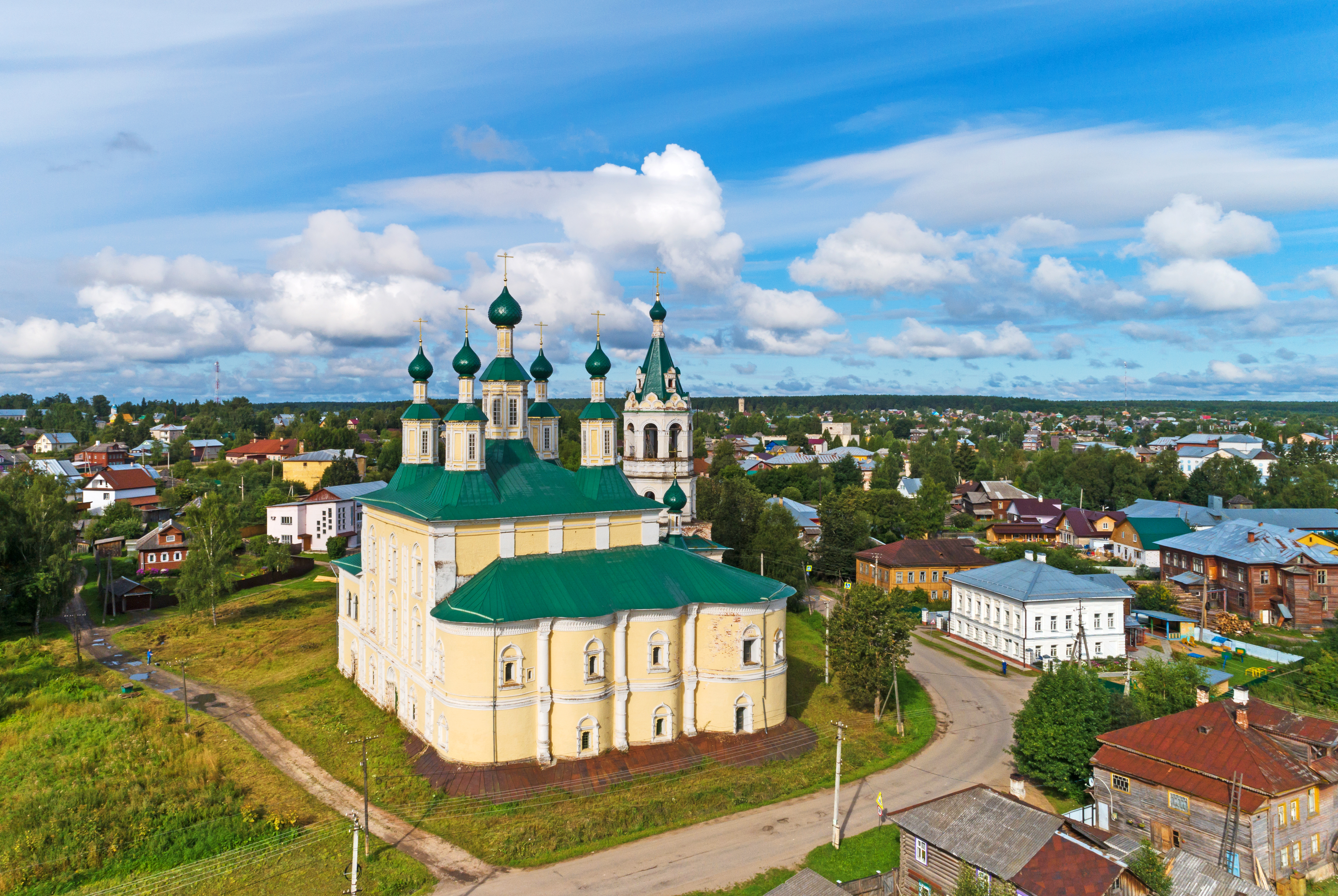
Soligalich Cathedral

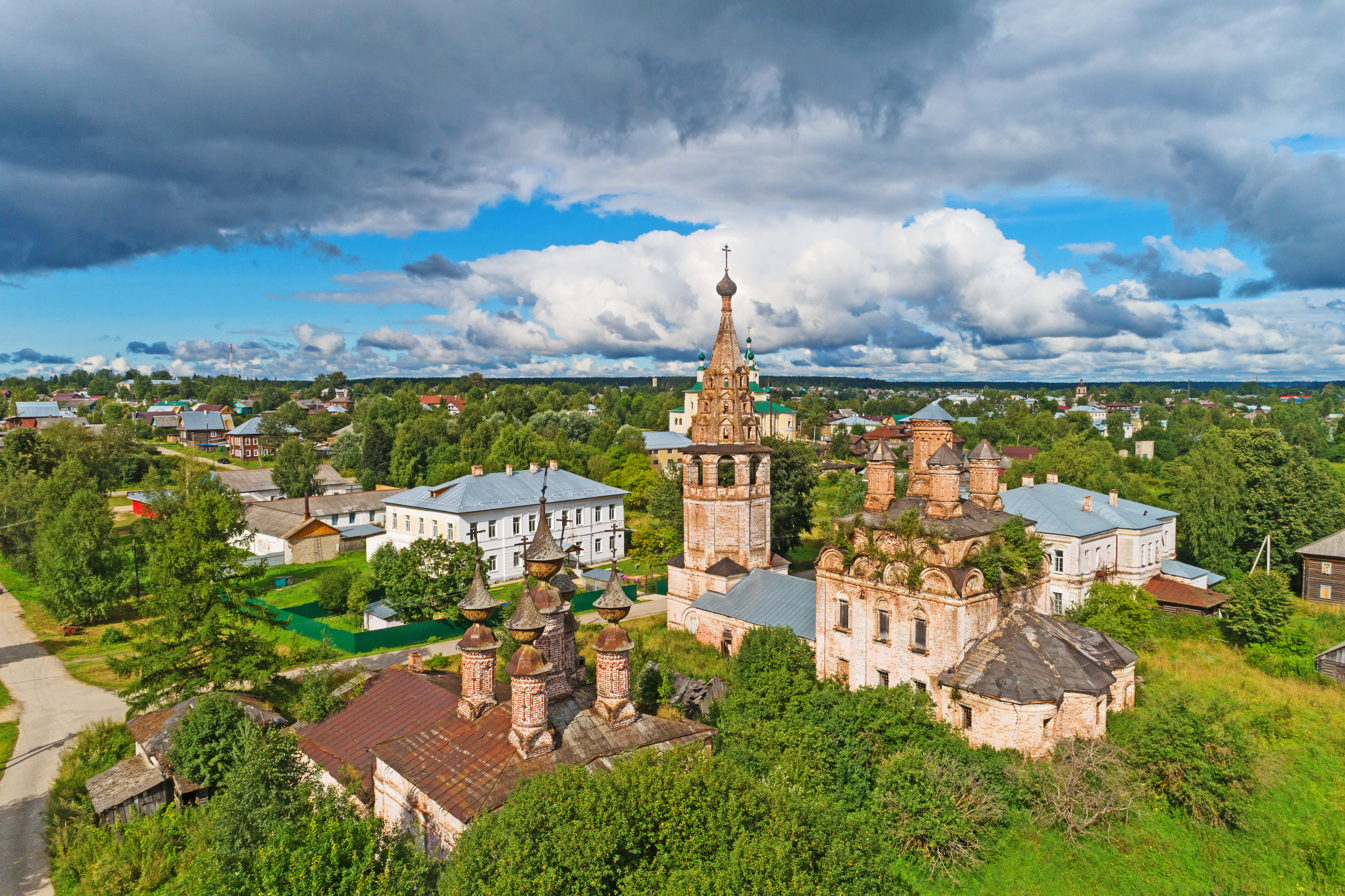
Resurrection monastery

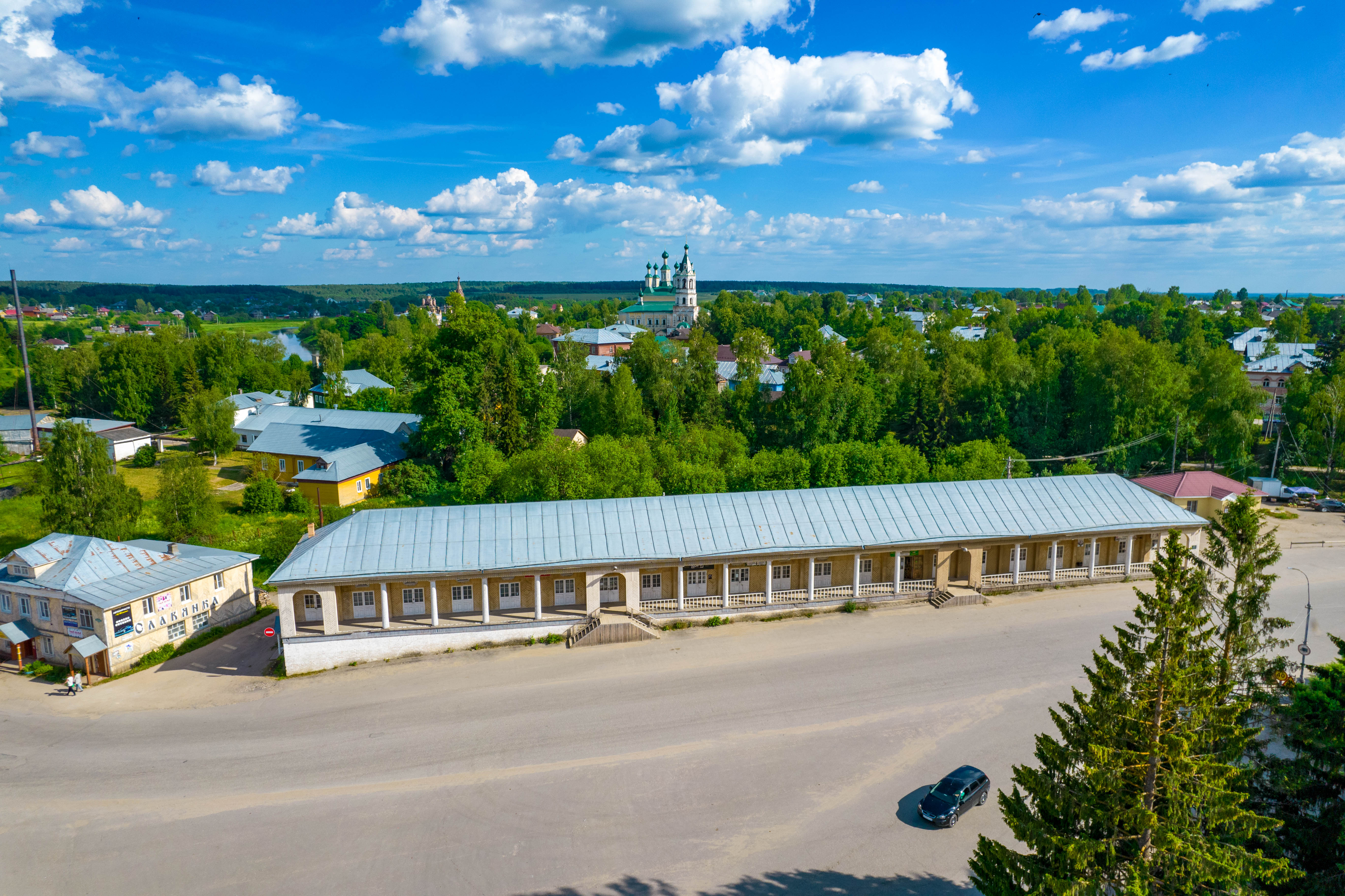
Trade Arcades

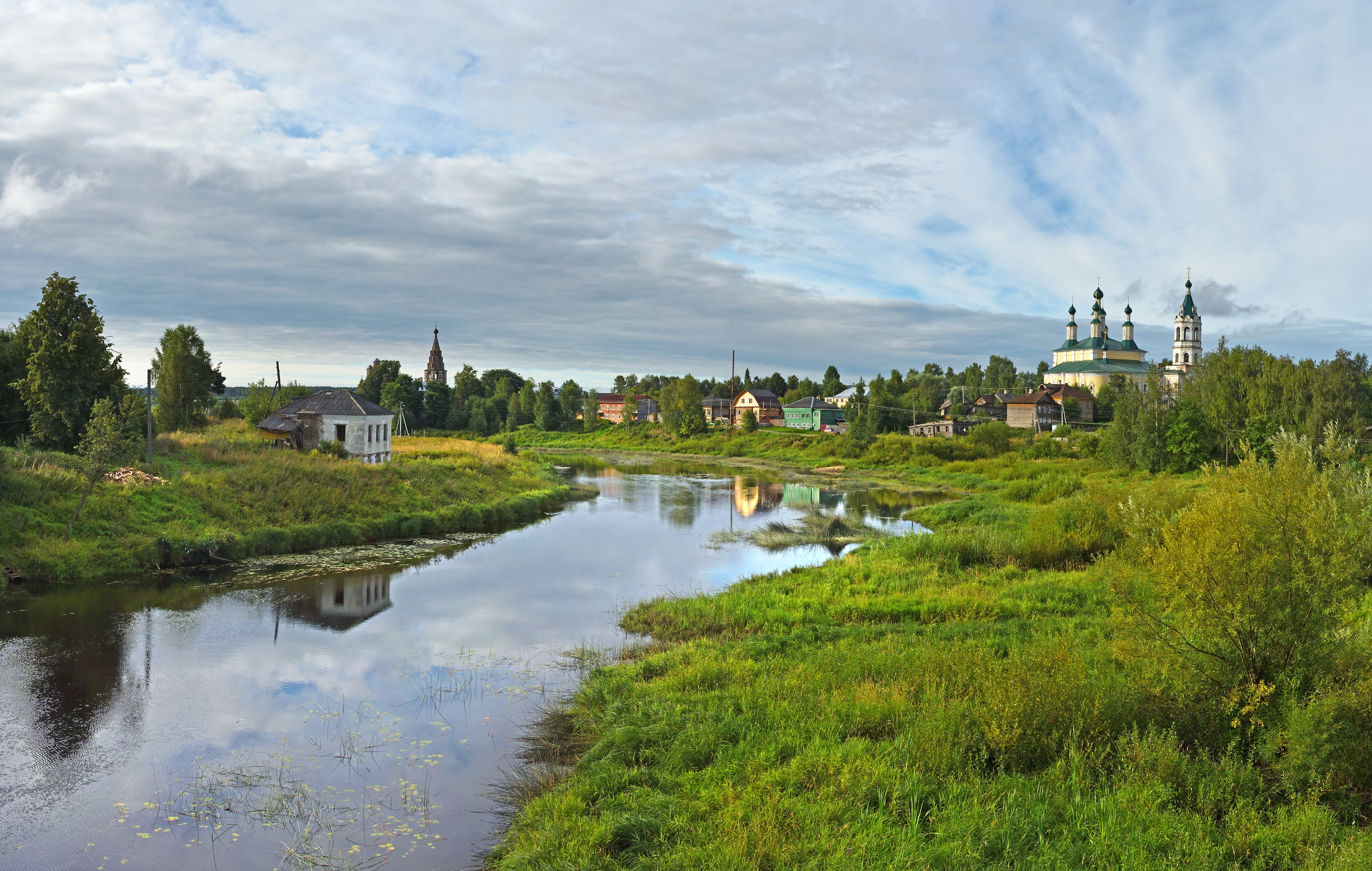
Kostroma River

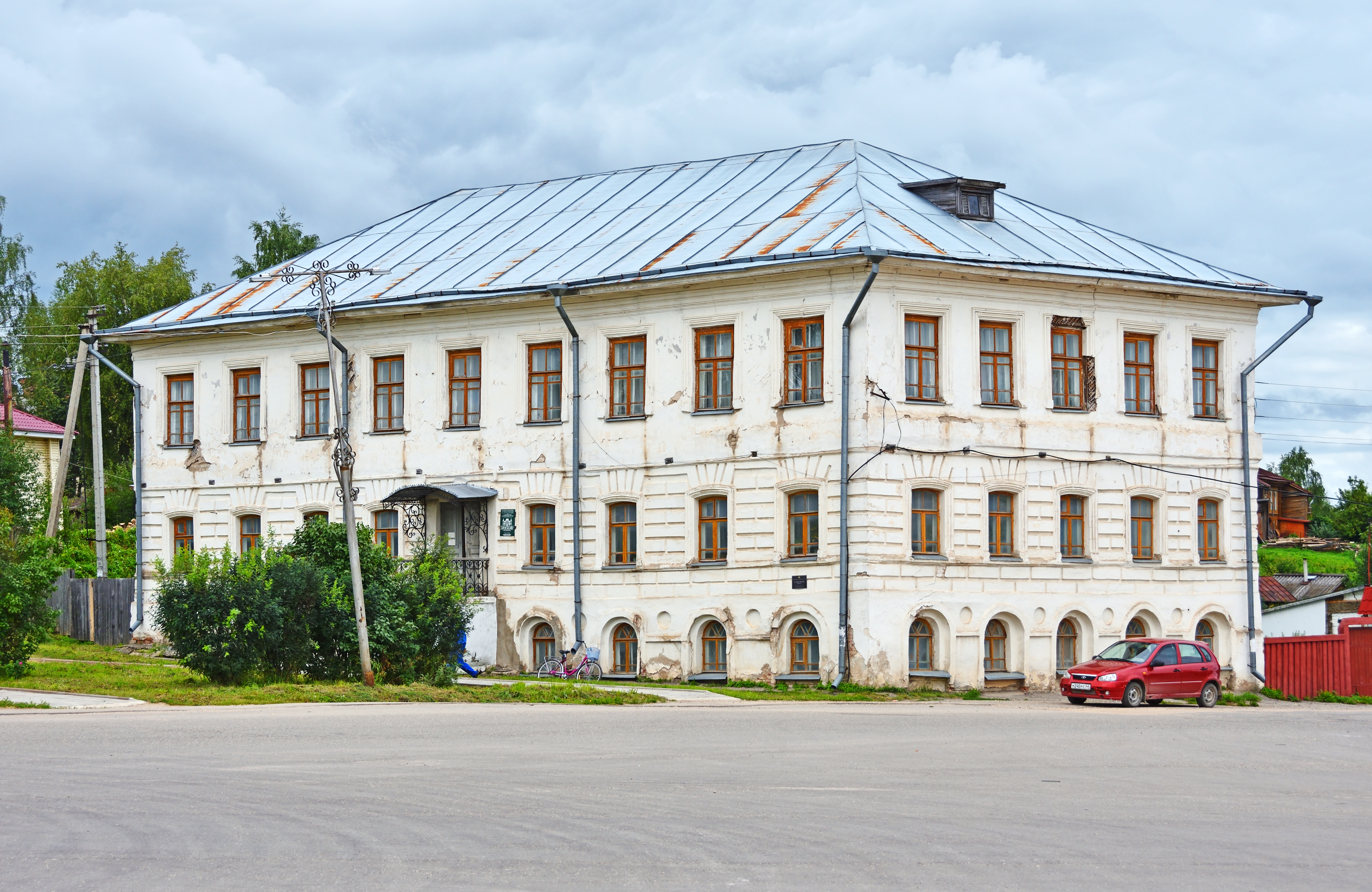
Local History Museum

== Notable people ==
Painter Grigory Ostrovsky was active in Soligalich; the only paintings known to be by his hand are currently held in the town's regional museum.

There is a monument to Gennady Nevelskoy, who was born in the vicinity.

Publisher Ivan Sytin was born in Soligalichsky District.
