= Lake Galichskoye =

Lake in Kostroma Oblast, Russia

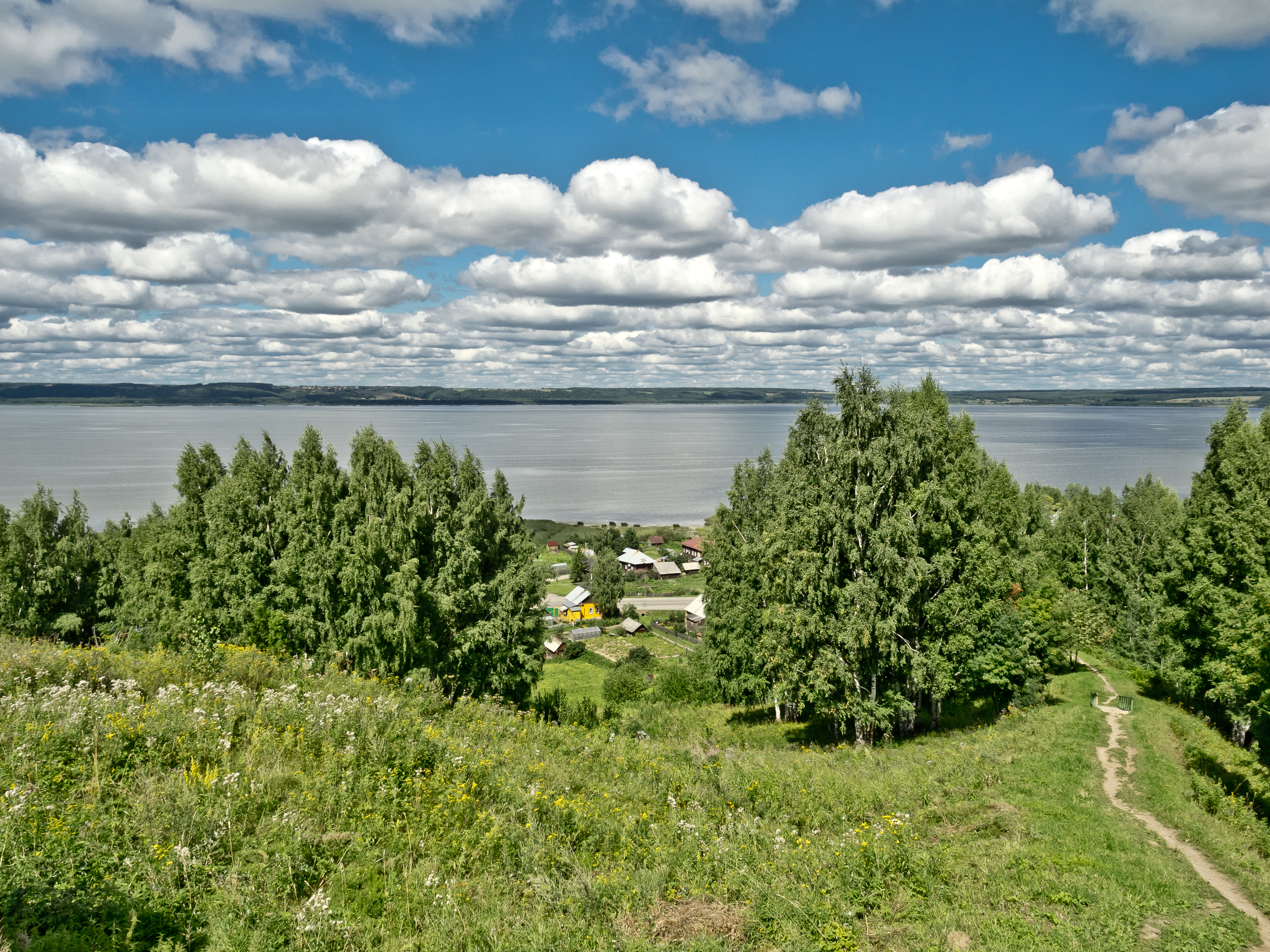

- Location within Kostroma Oblast
- Location: Kostroma Oblast
- Coordinates: 58°23′N 42°21′E
- Basin countries: Russia
- Max. depth: 5 m (16 ft)
- Surface elevation: 100 m (330 ft)

Lake Galichskoye (Russian: Галичское) is a freshwater lake in the northern part of Kostroma Oblast, Russia that takes its name from the old town of Galich sitting on its south bank. It is situated at the height of 100 meters above mean sea level, stretching for 17 km from west to east. The lake area is 75.4 km^{2}. The lake is shallow (up to 5 meters deep), its banks are marshy, and the bottom is silty. The lake has been noted for its fishing but is currently in danger of silting up. It is the source of the Vyoksa River.
