= Yermoshin =

Yermoshin or Ermoshin (Russian: Ермошин) is a Russian masculine surname derived from the given name Yermosha, a diminutive for Yermolay. Its feminine counterpart is Yermoshina or Ermoshina. Notable people with the surname include:

- Lidia Yermoshina (born 1953), Belarusian politician
- Vladimir Yermoshin (born 1942), Belarusian politician
