= Obnora =

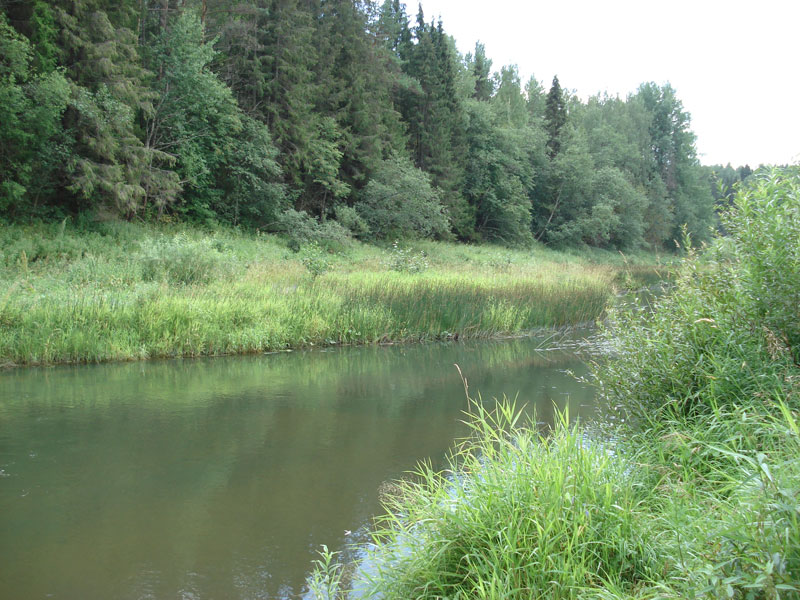
- Native name: Обнора (Russian)

Location
- Country: Russia

Physical characteristics
- Mouth: Kostroma
  - coordinates: 58.2199°N 40.9596°E
- Length: 132 km (82 mi)
- Basin size: 2,440 km^{2} (940 sq mi)

Basin features
- Progression: Kostroma→ Volga→ Caspian Sea

The Obnora (Russian: Обно́ра) is a river in Vologda and Yaroslavl Oblasts of Russia. It is a right tributary of the Kostroma. It is 132 kilometres (82 mi) long, with a drainage basin of 2,440 square kilometres (940 mi^{2}).

The town of Lyubim is situated on the Obnora.

== See also ==
- Pavlo-Obnorsky Monastery situated on and named for river
