= Yermolino, Perm Krai =

Yermolino Ермолино
- Village
- Location within Perm Krai Location within Russia
- Coordinates: 57°43′N 57°18′E
- Country: Russia
- Region: Perm Krai
- District: Beryozovsky District
- Time zone: UTC+5:00

Yermolino (Russian: Ермолино) is a rural locality (a village) in Pereborskoye Rural Settlement, Beryozovsky District, Perm Krai, Russia. The population was 7 as of 2010.

== Geography ==
Yermolino is located on the Shakva River, 23 km north of Beryozovka (the district's administrative centre) by road. Bereznik is the nearest rural locality.
