= Shacha (Kostroma Oblast) =

River in Kostroma Oblast, Russia

- Native name: Шача (Russian)

Location
- Country: Russia

Physical characteristics
- Mouth: Kostroma
  - coordinates: 58.2782°N 41.0369°E
- Length: 113 km (70 mi)
- Basin size: 865 km^{2} (334 sq mi)

Basin features
- Progression: Kostroma→ Volga→ Caspian Sea

The Shacha (Russian: Шача) is a river in Kostroma Oblast, Russia. It is a left tributary of the Kostroma River. It is 247 kilometres (153 mi) long, and has a drainage basin of 5,800 square kilometres (2,200 sq mi).
