= Yermolov =

Yermolov (Russian: Ермолов [(j)ɪrˈmoɫəf]) is a Russian surname which derives from the given name Yermolay (Russian: Ермолай) or its shortened form Yermol; these derive from the Greek name Hermolaos. Notable people with the surname include:

- Aleksey Yermolov (1777–1861), Russian general
- Alexey Yermolov (politician) (1847–1917), Russian politician
- Alexander Yermolov (1754–1834), Russian courtier
- Alina Ermolova
- Daniil Yermolov
- Irina Ermolova
- Maria Yermolova
- Valentina Yermolova
