= Lyubimsky District =

Lyubimsky District Любимский район (Russian)
- District
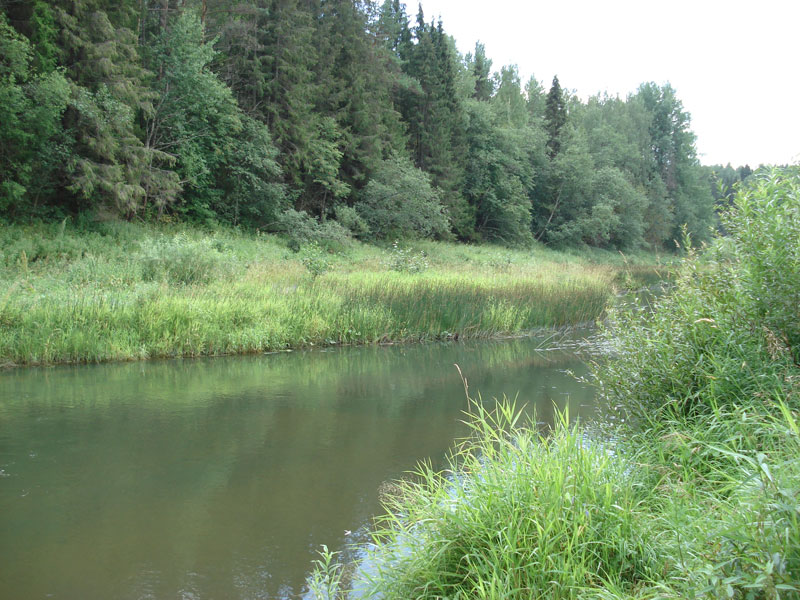
- The Obnora River near the selo of Voskresenskoye in Lyubimsky District

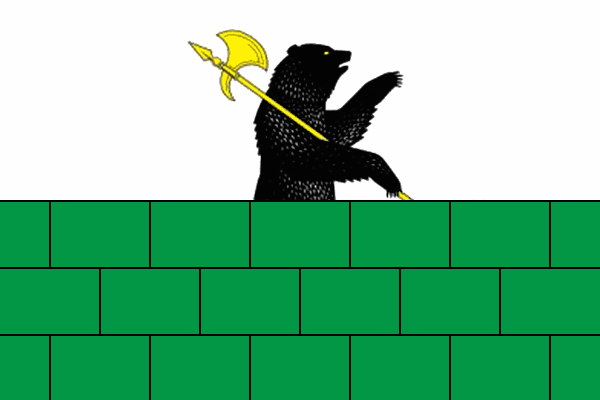
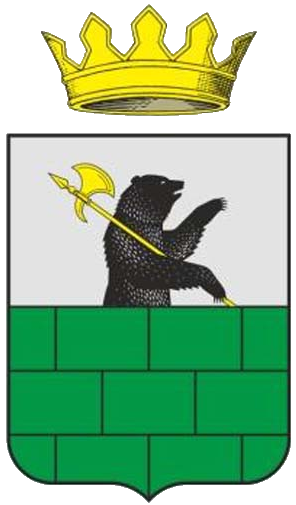
- Flag Coat of arms
- Location of Lyubimsky District in Yaroslavl Oblast
- Coordinates: 58°22′N 40°41′E
- Country: Russia
- Federal subject: Yaroslavl Oblast
- Established: 1929
- Administrative center: Lyubim

Area
  - Total: 1,960 km^{2} (760 sq mi)

Population (2010 Census)
  - Total: 11,789
  - Estimate (2018): 10,623 (−9.9%)
  - Density: 6.01/km^{2} (15.6/sq mi)
  - Urban: 47.1%
  - Rural: 52.9%

Administrative structure
  - Administrative divisions: 1 Towns of district significance, 8 Rural okrugs
  - Inhabited localities: 1 cities/towns, 280 rural localities

Municipal structure
  - Municipally incorporated as: Lyubimsky Municipal District
  - Municipal divisions: 1 urban settlements, 3 rural settlements
- Time zone: UTC+3 (MSK)
- OKTMO ID: 78618000

Lyubimsky District (Russian: Любимский райо́н) is an administrative and municipal district (raion), one of the seventeen in Yaroslavl Oblast, Russia. It is located in the northeast of the oblast. The area of the district is 1,960 square kilometers (760 sq mi). Its administrative center is the town of Lyubim. Population: 11,789 (2010 Census); 13,987 (2002 census); 16,694 (1989 Soviet census). The population of Lyubim accounts for 47.1% of the district's total population.
