= Ermolao Barbaro (disambiguation) =

Ermolao Barbaro may refer to:

- Ermolao Barbaro the Elder (died 1471), bishop of Verona, humanist
- Ermolao Barbaro (1454–1493), patriarch of Aquileia, humanist
- Ermolao Barbaro (died 1556), politician
- Ermolao Barbaro (1548–1622), patriarch of Aquileia
