= Kostroma (river) =

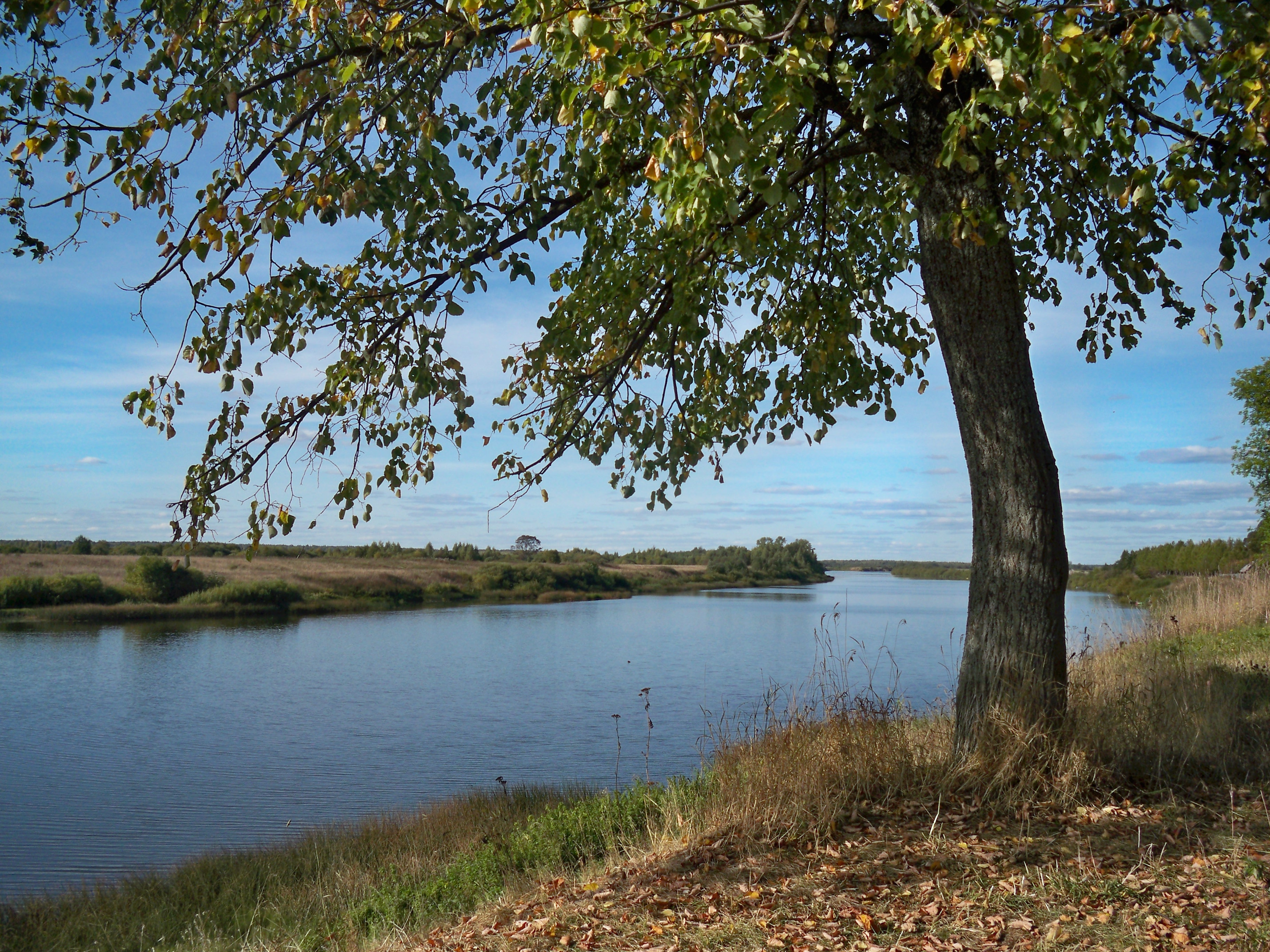
- View of the Kostroma near the village of Most Sandogora

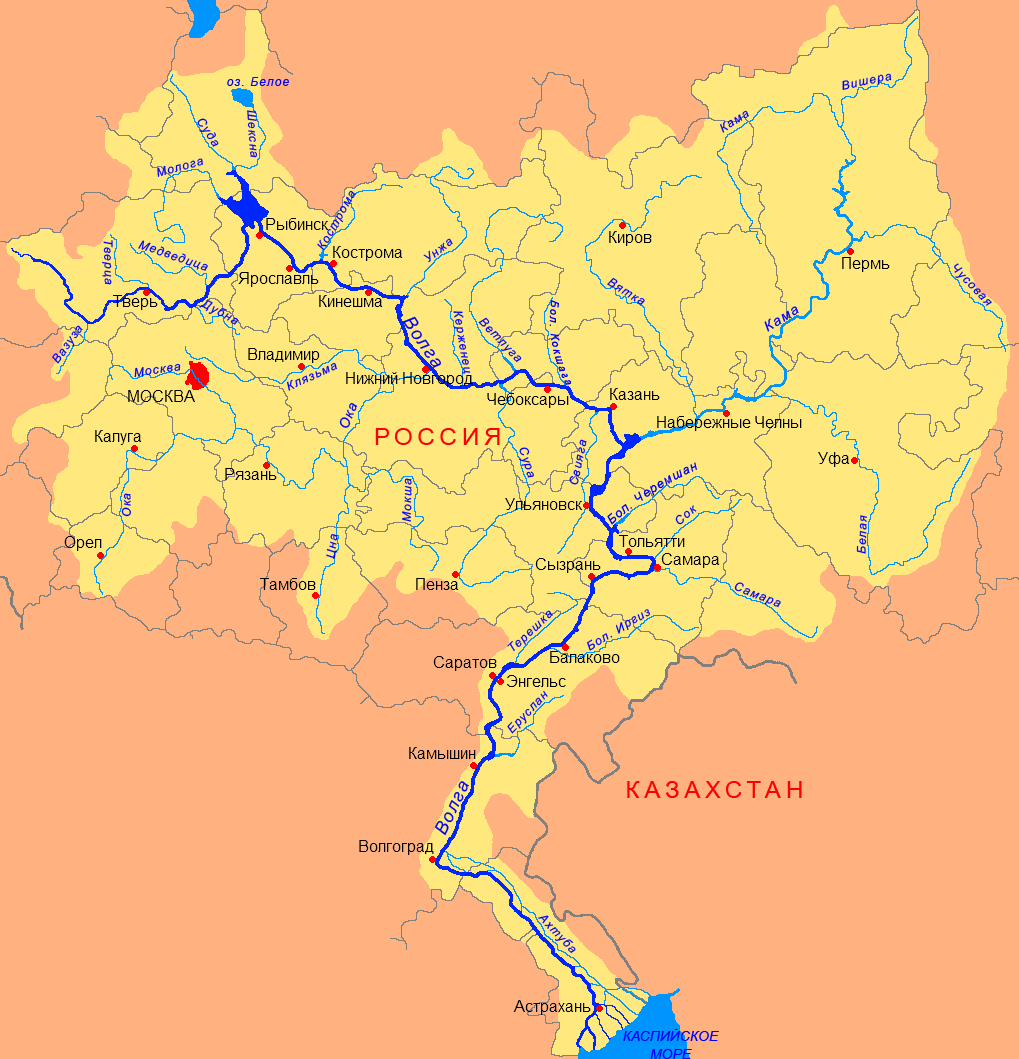
- Volga basin

Location
- Country: Russia

Physical characteristics
- Source
  - location: near Knyazhevo Chuhlomskogo
- Mouth
  - location: Gorky Reservoir at Kostroma
  - coordinates: 55.9283°N 34.5382°E
- Length: 354 km (220 mi)
- Basin size: 16,000 square kilometres (6,200 mi^{2})
- Discharge
  - average: 85 m^{3}/s (3,000 cu ft/s)

Basin features
- Progression: Volga→ Caspian Sea
- River system: Volga
- Tributaries
  - left: Vocha, Mezenda, Vyoksa, Tyobza, Shacha
  - right: Shugoma, Svetitsa, Selma, Monza, Obnora

The Kostroma (Russian: Кострома́) is a river in the European part of Russia. It flows through the Kostroma and Yaroslavl Oblasts, and becomes a left tributary of the Volga, which it enters at the Gorky Reservoir, at the city of Kostroma.

Prior to the flooding of the Gorky Reservoir in 1955-1957, the Kostroma River flowed into the Volga within the city limits of Kostroma. The Ipatiev Monastery stands at the old confluence of the Kostroma and the Volga.

The river is 354 kilometres (220 mi) long, and its drainage basin covers 16,000 square kilometres (6,200 mi^{2}). The average water flow is 71 cubic metres per second (2,500 cu ft/s) at the town of Buy, 124 kilometres (77 mi) from the mouth, and 85 cubic metres per second (3,000 cu ft/s) at the mouth

Major tributaries include the Vocha, Mezenda, Vyoksa, Tyobza, and Shacha on the left, and the Shugoma, Svetitsa, Selma, Monza, and Obnora on the right. Before the establishment of the Gorky Reservoir, the Sot and Mesa were also tributaries; they now flow directly into the reservoir.

The towns of Soligalich and Buy stand on the river.

The Kostroma freezes up in November and thaws in April or early May.

The Kostroma begins near the village of Knyazhevo Chuhlomskogo in the Kostroma Oblast. The upper river is relatively narrow and winding, but it soon gathers the water of many tributaries, increasing its width to about 30 metres (98 ft) or 40 metres (130 ft). In the upper and middle reaches of the riverbed there are rapids, and the banks are often wooded and sometimes steep. Here it is suitable for swimming due to the large amount of snags and debris.

By the time it flows past the town of Buy, the width of the river exceeds 60 meters (200 ft); from this point on the river is navigable. From here down to the reservoir it begins to form large bends and oxbow lakes, and sometimes floods.

The last 50 kilometres (31 mi) of the Kostroma's course form the border between the Yaroslavl and Kostroma oblasts.

== Etymology ==
The river bears the name of the Slavic goddess Kostroma.
