= Frolovo, Totemsky District, Vologda Oblast =

Frolovo Фролово
- Village
- Location within Vologda Oblast Location within Russia
- Coordinates: 59°25′N 42°48′E
- Country: Russia
- Region: Vologda Oblast
- District: Totemsky District
- Time zone: UTC+3:00

Frolovo (Russian: Фролово) is a rural locality (a village) in Tolshmenskoye Rural Settlement, Totemsky District, Vologda Oblast, Russia. The population was 21 as of 2002.

== Geography ==
Frolovo is located 98 km south of Totma (the district's administrative centre) by road. Pervomaysky is the nearest rural locality.
