= Sergey Yermolenko =

Belarusian footballer and coach

Personal information
- Date of birth: 29 May 1972 (age 54)
- Place of birth: Zhodino, Belarusian SSR
- Position: Defender

Youth career
- 1987–1990: BelAZ Zhodino

Senior career*
Years	Team	Apps	(Gls)
1991–1992	Gomselmash Gomel	34	(1)
1993	Vedrich Rechitsa	6	(0)
1993–1994	Torpedo Zhodino	36	(3)
1995–1998	Dinamo-93 Minsk	62	(0)
1998	Dinamo Minsk	6	(0)
1999	Skonto	2	(0)
2000	Policijas FK	22	(0)
2001	Dinamo Brest	11	(0)
2002	Shakhtyor Soligorsk	4	(0)
2003–2005	Veras Nesvizh	59	(6)

Managerial career
- 2006–2007: Veras Nesvizh (assistant)
- 2009–2010: Kommunalnik Slonim
- 2011–2013: Torpedo-BelAZ Zhodino (reserves)
- * Club domestic league appearances and goals

Sergey Yermolenko (Belarusian: Сяргей Ярмоленка; Russian: Сергей Ермоленко; born 29 May 1972) is a Belarusian football coach and former player.
