= Soligalichsky District =

Soligalichsky District Солигаличский район (Russian)
- District
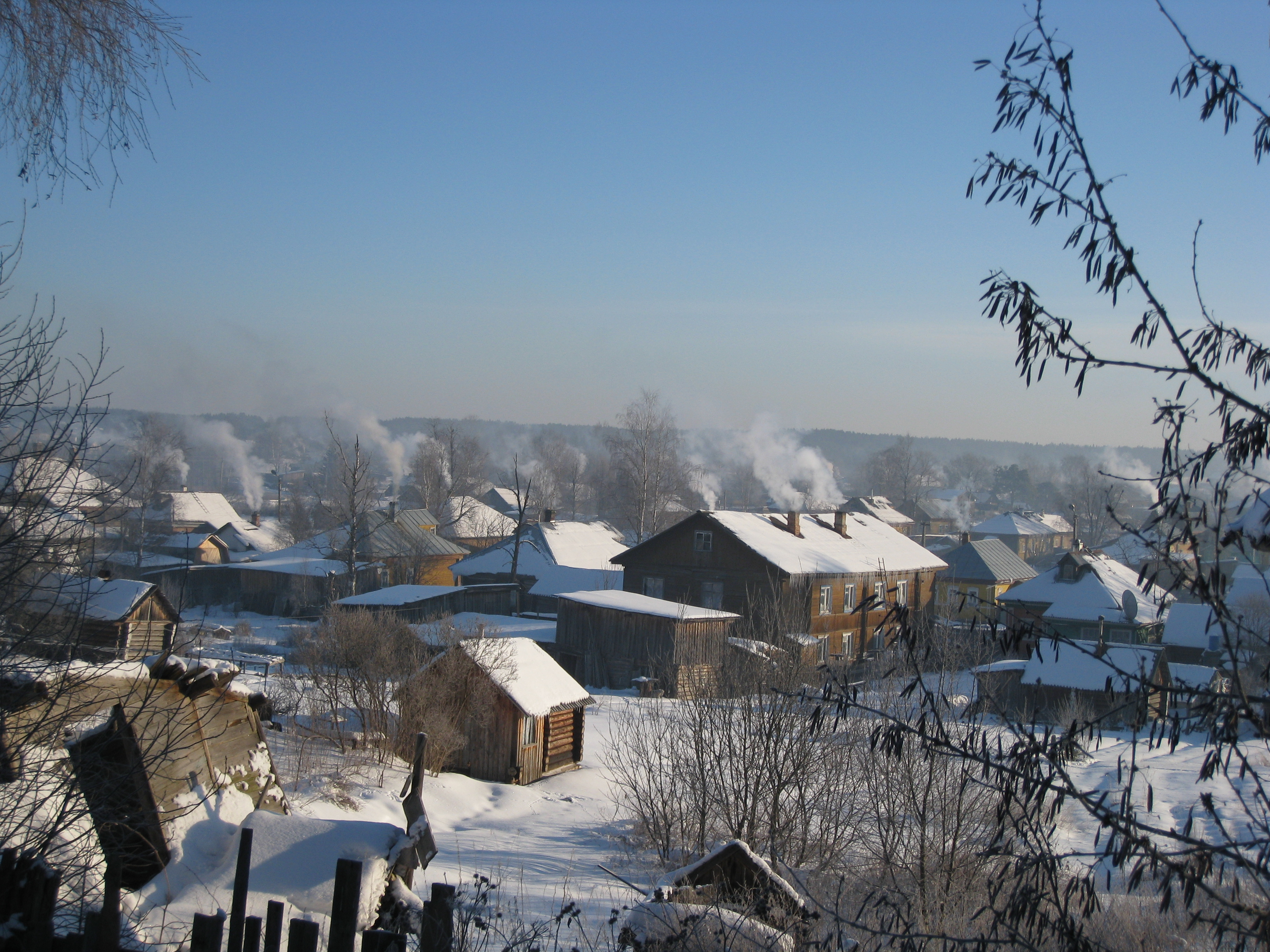
- Heating houses with Russian ovens in Soligalich city, Soligalichsky District

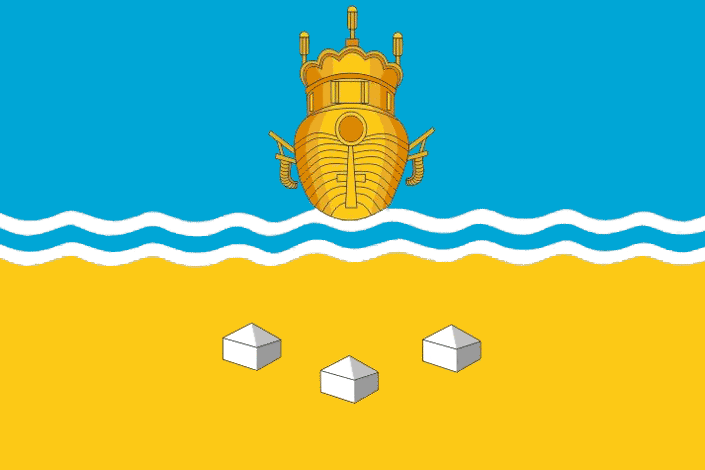
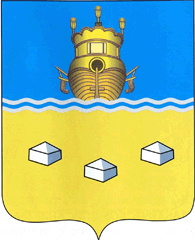
- Flag Coat of arms
- Location of Soligalichsky District in Kostroma Oblast
- Coordinates: 59°05′N 42°17′E
- Country: Russia
- Federal subject: Kostroma Oblast
- Established: 8 October 1928
- Administrative center: Soligalich

Area
  - Total: 3,100 km^{2} (1,200 sq mi)

Population (2010 Census)
  - Total: 10,265
  - Density: 3.3/km^{2} (8.6/sq mi)
  - Urban: 62.7%
  - Rural: 37.3%

Administrative structure
  - Administrative divisions: 1 Towns of district significance, 7 Settlements
  - Inhabited localities: 1 cities/towns, 182 rural localities

Municipal structure
  - Municipally incorporated as: Soligalichsky Municipal District
  - Municipal divisions: 1 urban settlements, 7 rural settlements
- Time zone: UTC+3 (MSK)
- OKTMO ID: 34640000
- Website: http://www.soligalich.org/

Soligalichsky District (Russian: Солига́личский райо́н) is an administrative and municipal district (raion), one of the twenty-four in Kostroma Oblast, Russia. It is located in the northwest of the oblast. The area of the district is 3,100 square kilometers (1,200 sq mi). Its administrative center is the town of Soligalich. Population: 7,937 (2021 census); 10,265 (2010 census); 12,304 (2002 Census); 14,798 (1989 Soviet census). The population of Soligalich accounts for 69.7% of the district's total population.
