= Yermolino, Vladimir Oblast =

Yermolino Ермолино
- Village
- Location within Vladimir Oblast Location within Russia
- Coordinates: 56°02′N 39°29′E
- Country: Russia
- Region: Vladimir Oblast
- District: Petushinsky District
- Time zone: UTC+3:00

Yermolino (Russian: Ермолино) is a rural locality (a village) in Petushinskoye Rural Settlement, Petushinsky District, Vladimir Oblast, Russia. The population was 20 as of 2010. There are 4 streets.

== Geography ==
Yermolino is located on the Laska River, 17 km north of Petushki (the district's administrative centre) by road. Sanino is the nearest rural locality.
