= Frolovo, Mezhdurechensky District, Vologda Oblast =

Frolovo Фролово
- Village
- Location within Vologda Oblast Location within Russia
- Coordinates: 59°17′N 40°45′E
- Country: Russia
- Region: Vologda Oblast
- District: Mezhdurechensky District
- Time zone: UTC+3:00

Frolovo (Russian: Фролово) is a rural locality (a village) in Staroselskoye Rural Settlement, Mezhdurechensky District, Vologda Oblast, Russia. The population was 9 as of 2002.

== Geography ==
Frolovo is located 22 km southwest of Shuyskoye (the district's administrative centre) by road. Novaya is the nearest rural locality.
