= Yermolino, Gryazovetsky District, Vologda Oblast =

Yermolino Ермолино
- Village
- Location within Vologda Oblast Location within Russia
- Coordinates: 58°44′N 40°22′E
- Country: Russia
- Region: Vologda Oblast
- District: Gryazovetsky District
- Time zone: UTC+3:00

Yermolino (Russian: Ермолино) is a rural locality (a village) in Rostilovskoye Rural Settlement, Gryazovetsky District, Vologda Oblast, Russia. The population was 24 as of 2002.

== Geography ==
Yermolino is located 23 km south of Gryazovets (the district's administrative centre) by road. Kokarevo is the nearest rural locality.
