= Stepanovo =

Stepanovo (Russian: Степаново) is the name of several rural localities in Russia.

== Ivanovo Oblast ==
As of 2022, two rural localities in Ivanovo Oblast bear this name:

- Stepanovo, Ivanovsky District, Ivanovo Oblast, a village in Ivanovsky District
- Stepanovo, Zavolzhsky District, Ivanovo Oblast, a village in Zavolzhsky District

== Kostroma Oblast ==
As of 2022, two rural localities in Kostroma Oblast bear this name:

- Stepanovo, Galichsky District, Kostroma Oblast, a village in Stepanovskoye Settlement of Galichsky District
- Stepanovo, Kostromskoy District, Kostroma Oblast, a village in Kotovskoye Settlement of Kostromskoy District

== Krasnoyarsk Krai ==
As of 2022, one rural locality in Krasnoyarsk Krai bears this name:

- Stepanovo, Krasnoyarsk Krai, a village in Karapselsky Selsoviet of Ilansky District

== Moscow Oblast ==
As of 2022, two rural localities in Moscow Oblast bear this name:

- Stepanovo, Dmitrovsky District, Moscow Oblast, a village under the administrative jurisdiction of the town of Yakhroma in Dmitrovsky District
- Stepanovo, Noginsky District, Moscow Oblast, a village in Stepanovskoye Rural Settlement of Noginsky District

== Nizhny Novgorod Oblast ==
As of 2022, four rural localities in Nizhny Novgorod Oblast bear this name:

- Stepanovo, Arzamassky District, Nizhny Novgorod Oblast, a selo in Sliznevsky Selsoviet of Arzamassky District
- Stepanovo, Bolshemostovsky Selsoviet, Koverninsky District, Nizhny Novgorod Oblast, a village in Bolshemostovsky Selsoviet of Koverninsky District
- Stepanovo, Gavrilovsky Selsoviet, Koverninsky District, Nizhny Novgorod Oblast, a village in Gavrilovsky Selsoviet of Koverninsky District
- Stepanovo, Vachsky District, Nizhny Novgorod Oblast, a village in Kazakovsky Selsoviet of Vachsky District

== Novgorod Oblast ==
As of 2022, two rural localities in Novgorod Oblast bear this name:

- Stepanovo, Khvoyninsky District, Novgorod Oblast, a village in Dvorishchenskoye Settlement of Khvoyninsky District
- Stepanovo, Soletsky District, Novgorod Oblast, a village in Dubrovskoye Settlement of Soletsky District

== Perm Krai ==
As of 2022, three rural localities in Perm Krai bear this name:

- Stepanovo, Chaykovsky, Perm Krai, a selo under the administrative jurisdiction of the town of krai significance of Chaykovsky
- Stepanovo, Permsky District, Perm Krai, a village in Permsky District
- Stepanovo, Yusvinsky District, Perm Krai, a village in Yusvinsky District

== Pskov Oblast ==
As of 2022, two rural localities in Pskov Oblast bear this name:

- Stepanovo, Ostrovsky District, Pskov Oblast, a village in Ostrovsky District
- Stepanovo, Porkhovsky District, Pskov Oblast, a village in Porkhovsky District

== Ryazan Oblast ==
As of 2022, one rural locality in Ryazan Oblast bears this name:

- Stepanovo, Ryazan Oblast, a village in Giblitsky Rural Okrug of Kasimovsky District

== Smolensk Oblast ==
As of 2022, two rural localities in Smolensk Oblast bear this name:

- Stepanovo, Demidovsky District, Smolensk Oblast, a village in Shapovskoye Rural Settlement of Demidovsky District
- Stepanovo, Dukhovshchinsky District, Smolensk Oblast, a village in Bulgakovskoye Rural Settlement of Dukhovshchinsky District

== Tver Oblast ==
As of 2022, two rural localities in Tver Oblast bear this name:

- Stepanovo, Kimrsky District, Tver Oblast, a village in Kimrsky District
- Stepanovo, Likhoslavlsky District, Tver Oblast, a village in Likhoslavlsky District

== Udmurt Republic ==
As of 2022, one rural locality in the Udmurt Republic bears this name:

- Stepanovo, Udmurt Republic, a selo in Kamsky Selsoviet of Votkinsky District

== Vladimir Oblast ==
As of 2022, six rural localities in Vladimir Oblast bear this name:

- Stepanovo (Krasnooktyabrskoye Rural Settlement), Gus-Khrustalny District, Vladimir Oblast, a village in Gus-Khrustalny District; municipally, a part of Krasnooktyabrskoye Rural Settlement of that district
- Stepanovo (Ivanishchi Rural Settlement), Gus-Khrustalny District, Vladimir Oblast, a village in Gus-Khrustalny District; municipally, a part of Ivanishchi Rural Settlement of that district
- Stepanovo, Kovrovsky District, Vladimir Oblast, a village in Kovrovsky District
- Stepanovo (Pekshinskoye Rural Settlement), Petushinsky District, Vladimir Oblast, a village in Petushinsky District; municipally, a part of Pekshinskoye Rural Settlement of that district
- Stepanovo (Nagornoye Rural Settlement), Petushinsky District, Vladimir Oblast, a village in Petushinsky District; municipally, a part of Nagornoye Rural Settlement of that district
- Stepanovo, Sudogodsky District, Vladimir Oblast, a village in Sudogodsky District

== Vologda Oblast ==
As of 2022, nine rural localities in Vologda Oblast bear this name:

- Stepanovo, Babayevsky District, Vologda Oblast, a village in Toropovsky Selsoviet of Babayevsky District
- Stepanovo, Cherepovetsky District, Vologda Oblast, a village in Korotovsky Selsoviet of Cherepovetsky District
- Stepanovo, Gryazovetsky District, Vologda Oblast, a village in Sidorovsky Selsoviet of Gryazovetsky District
- Stepanovo, Sokolsky District, Vologda Oblast, a village in Prigorodny Selsoviet of Sokolsky District
- Stepanovo, Vashkinsky District, Vologda Oblast, a village in Pokrovsky Selsoviet of Vashkinsky District
- Stepanovo, Verkhovazhsky District, Vologda Oblast, a village in Shelotsky Selsoviet of Verkhovazhsky District
- Stepanovo, Bereznikovsky Selsoviet, Vologodsky District, Vologda Oblast, a village in Bereznikovsky Selsoviet of Vologodsky District
- Stepanovo, Nefedovsky Selsoviet, Vologodsky District, Vologda Oblast, a village in Nefedovsky Selsoviet of Vologodsky District
- Stepanovo, Sosnovsky Selsoviet, Vologodsky District, Vologda Oblast, a village in Sosnovsky Selsoviet of Vologodsky District

== Yaroslavl Oblast ==
As of 2022, three rural localities in Yaroslavl Oblast bear this name:

- Stepanovo, Borisoglebsky District, Yaroslavl Oblast, a village in Andreyevsky Rural Okrug of Borisoglebsky District
- Stepanovo, Danilovsky District, Yaroslavl Oblast, a village in Seredskoy Rural Okrug of Danilovsky District
- Stepanovo, Uglichsky District, Yaroslavl Oblast, a village in Vozdvizhensky Rural Okrug of Uglichsky District
