= Shelota =

Shelota Шелота
- Selo
- Location within Vologda Oblast Location within Russia
- Coordinates: 60°22′N 41°40′E
- Country: Russia
- Region: Vologda Oblast
- District: Verkhovazhsky District
- Time zone: UTC+3:00

Shelota (Russian: Шелота) is a rural locality (a selo) and the administrative center of Shelotskoye Rural Settlement, Verkhovazhsky District, Vologda Oblast, Russia. The population was 401 as of 2019. There are 11 streets.

== Geography ==
The distance to Verkhovazhye (the district's administrative centre) is 57 km by road. Afoninskaya, Makarovskaya, Fofanovskaya, Maloye Pogorelovo, Stepanovo, Chavrovskaya, Yakuninskaya, Gorka-Nazarovskaya, Dresvyanka, Garmanovo, Doroninskaya, Tatarinskaya, Denisovskaya are the nearest rural localities. It is located in 160 km from Vologda along the M8 highway, the distance from Moscow is 490 km.

== Relief, flora and fauna ==
The relief was formed in the area of the penultimate Moscow glaciation. The relief is of an erosional-glacial character.*

Coniferous vegetation predominates. The district is rich in useful herbs: Ivan-chai (rosebay willow-herb), Tavolga (meadowsweet) and others.

Fauna is typical for the northern part of Russia: elk, brown bear, wild boar, wolverine, white hare, pine marten, badger, wolf, fox; birds - wood grouse, ptarmigan, black grouse, hazel grouse. In rivers and lakes there are salmon, nelma, bream, pike perch, perch, luce, etc..

== History ==
Shelota is the name of the area mentioned in historical documents (list of the Dvina lands) since 1471.

In June 1858, the Emperor Alexander 2 rode along the old Arkhangelsk tract. There is information about the impressions of Alexander 2 of the area he saw. “On the way to the next Nikiforovskaya station, before reaching the Shelota Volost government, there is a large mountain, from which a long and sloping descent into the valley begins. The Emperor ordered to stop and, getting up in the carriage, admired the picturesque view. From here, a wide outlook opened up with settlements and villages scattered here and there, whitewashed churches with their high bell towers and spitz shining brightly in the rays of the morning sun, the Vaga River meandering in a bright, silvery ribbon, forests, fields and arable land." The view that opened up to His Majesty on the way along the Vaga River impressed the Sovereign Emperor so much that he then drove to the village of Smetaninskaya with an open top of the carriage.

Currently Shelota is a central rural settlement as part of Verkhovazhsky District of Vologda Oblast.

An expedition was held at the territory of Shelota for filming of the "Sashka" movie. It is the story of a 12-year-old boy Sasha, who dreams of getting on the inside of a local gang of hooligans.

Since 2017, with the support of non-profit organizations, the "Shelota - Point of Attraction" project has been organized in which the Shelotyans and people who are interested in rural life hold cultural and social events.

Such events include:

1. International Ceramic Festival in Shelota

The founder of this festival is Stepanova Svetlana Anatolyevna. The event is international; guests from various Russian cities and countries such as Germany, Syria, Yemen, Lebanon attended.

2. Restoration of the Trinity Church and Trinity Festivities

In 2017, 5 bells were cast for the future bell tower with private donations. And in 2020, master Georgy Fedyaevsky restored the stained glass window on the main facade of the building.

3. Various concerts and lectures

4. Cultural tourism

5. Attracting volunteers to develop Shelota.

The following traditional and artistic crafts are presented in Shelota: Ceramic craft (Shelota is famous for its International Ceramic Festival, which attracts ceramists and guests from different cities and countries. And in August 2020, the Shelotyans became the first owners of a wood-fired ceramic kiln), Pottery, Weaving, Embroidery, Lace-making, Carpentry, Painting.

== Sights ==
=== Church of the Holy Trinity ===
Built in 1789.

The church is located in the settlement of Makarovskoe in Shelota on a hill, which gives a magical view of the village.

==== Church decoration ====
On the first floor, there are three thrones: Flora and Laurus, the prophet of God Elijah and St. Nicholas the Wonder-worker.

On the second floor, there are two thrones: the Life-Giving Trinity and in the name of the Nativity of the Most Holy Theotokos.

==== Church history ====
The church was built in the style of the Totma Baroque, which makes it possible to assume that it was built by craftsmen from Totma.

Since 1801, services have been conducted at the church all year round. The first floor of the church was heated, which made it possible to conduct services even in severe frosts.

During the Soviet Union times, the bell tower was destroyed to the ground. Today, all that remains of it is trash as a memory.

Now the liturgy is held in the summer. The church is under reconstruction.

In 2017, the bells for the future bell tower were cast. Bells were cast to order in Tutaev.

And in 2020, a stained glass window was installed on the main facade made by the master Georgy Fedyaevsky.

==== Church today ====
Trinity festivities are held annually in Shelota.

Over the past 10 years, on one Sunday, the Shelotyans have been organizing festivities which are attended by people from all over the country.

The festivities begin immediately after Matins. Religious procession around the church and under the song the crowd then descends from the temple to the field.

Festivities usually include games, traditional costumes, dances and singing, and folk instruments.

Festivities are held with donations from sponsors and residents.

=== Museum of local history ===
The local history museum is located in a wooden building near the Anyutin Square, which belongs to the Shelota school. Inside there is an exposition of village life, as well as objects of the Soviet Union times, the history of the Shelota School, a collection of stones found in the vicinity, etc. The route "One day in the village" has been elaborated, which includes a visit to the church, a walk in the village, a visit to the monument to the writer Vladimir Tendryakov, tea drinking at Koticheva Hill, rest on the grass, swimming in the Vaga river and a master class on making ritual dolls.

=== Monument to Tendryakov ===
Vladimir Fedorovich Tendryakov is a Russian Soviet writer, author of acutely conflict stories about the spiritual and moral problems of contemporary life, acute problems of Soviet society, about life in the countryside.

=== "Train kiln" Vaga ===
In August 2020, in the village of Makarovskaya, the first "train kiln"–type wood-fired ceramic kiln appeared in Russia. A team of ceramists under the leadership of the Vologda master Vladimir Kholshchagin built the kiln in 5 days, the stove was named "Vaga". The peculiarity is that the kiln has two burners. They start to heat from the bottom. Then, when the temperature rises, they heat from above. By that time, a coal ash bed has formed in the lower burner. Air passes through it and is heated, and ash, settling on the walls of the ceramics, gives the effect of ash glaze. The ceramics in such a kiln is very strong, and the visual effects are unpredictable.

The project was conducted by the non-profit organization "Center for Cultural Projects Festival" with support of the Presidential Grants Fund.

== Ceramic Festival ==
2017

The Ceramics Festival in Shelota became international in its first year: then ceramists Heida Nonnenmacher and Peter Wichmann, as well as a metal artist Martial Herbst came to the Russian North from Germany. Ceramists Alexander Gladky, Tatyana Vereshchagina and Svetlana Zhuchenko, as well as artists David Plaksin and Zoya Malyarenko, came to Shelota from the northern capital. Tatiana Gorbatova, master of the Somov school of ceramics, arrived from Verkhovazhye.

During the 7 days of the festival, the participants painted a variety of pottery, built a kiln for coal burning of ceramics, held master classes on three types of burning, including coal, paper and raku, and also exchanged experiences in organizing art exhibitions and charitable events. Local craftsmen taught guests to weave salt shakers from birch bark and make a traditional amulet doll.

In addition, the guests of the festival visited the Alekseevskaya Fair in Verkhovazhye, watched a performance at the Orthodox Art Theater, tasted pies from the Russian stove and took part in folk festivities.

2018

The second Ceramic Festival was held together with the non-profit organization Center for Cultural Programs “Culture and Peace”. This time, guests from Syria, Lebanon and Yemen came to Shelota to get acquainted with the Vologda outback and tell about the culture of their countries. Ceramists from St. Petersburg, the Arkhangelsk Oblast and Verkhovazhye, as well as wood master Oleg Arseniev and the folklore ensemble "Radonitsa" from the neighboring village of Lipki were invited to the festival.

During the festival, the participants made a sculpture for fire burning “Shelotyanka”, the image of which was inspired by traditional northern motives, held a raku firing and a master class on making products on a potter's wheel, and also listened to a lecture by Ikhlas Alfakih, an artist and lecturer of sculpture at Damascus University about modern technologies of modeling from polymer materials. One of the days of the festival was dedicated to Arab culture: the quests tried tabbouleh, kabsu and coffee from a copper coffee pot, wrote their names in Arabic script and learned to dance the Syrian national dance. Then it was the turn for local residents to tell the Arab guests about their native culture. The program of the “Russian Day” included valiant amusements, ditties, round dances and a lunch with dishes of traditional Russian cuisine.

2019

The third international ceramic festival was dedicated to the 90th anniversary of the Verkhovazhsky District and the 75th anniversary of Tatyana Vasilyevna Gorbatova, the keeper of the Somov craft. The festival was attended by ceramists from St. Petersburg, as well as guests from Moscow and Verkhovazhye. A special guest of the festival was Emily Slide, an international communications specialist from the United States, who lives most of her life in Germany and is fond of Russian culture.

The participants of the festival got acquainted with the technology of lace production, traditional wooden architecture and the life of the Russian North, visiting museums in Vologda, Semenkovo and Verkhovazhye. During the six days of the festival, everyone saw how to set up a loom, learned how to weave from birch bark and sculpt Somov whistles from clay.

The heart of the festival was the fire sculpture “Singing Tree”, which the participants created jointly based on the traditional Somov toy. They sculpted it from a special clay with the addition of chamotte: small particles of already burnt clay, which give the clay its reinforcing properties. On the final day of the festival, after three days of air drying and seven hours of drying with a gas burner, the ceramic sculpture was burned. This spectacle became even more impressive due to the fact that the sculpture exploded and “the birds flew from the singing tree”. Perhaps because the 60-kilogram sculpture was not dry enough due to weather conditions. the festival participants and local residents celebrated the experience gained with champagne and homemade panna cotta with wild berries.
