= Boldino =

Boldino (Russian: Болдино) is the name of several rural localities in Russia:

- Boldino, Perm Krai, a village in Kultayevskoye Rural Settlement, Permsky District, Perm Krai
- Boldino (settlement), Vladimir Oblast, a settlement in Pekshinskoye Rural Settlement, Petushinsky District, Vladimir Oblast
- Boldino (village), Vladimir Oblast, a village in Pekshinskoye Rural Settlement, Petushinsky District, Vladimir Oblast
- Bolshoye Boldino, a rural settlement in Nizhny Novgorod Oblast that is the ancestral home of Alexander Pushkin
