= Dresvyanka =

Dresvyanka may refer to several localities in Russia:

- Dresvyanka, Altai Krai
- Dresvyanka, Belozersky District, Vologda Oblast
- Dresvyanka, Chushevitskoye Rural Settlement, Verkhovazhsky District, Vologda Oblast
- Dresvyanka, Kharovsky District, Vologda Oblast
- Dresvyanka, Shelotskoye Rural Settlement, Verkhovazhsky District, Vologda Oblast
- Dresvyanka, Shepotskoye Rural Settlement, Verkhovazhsky District, Vologda Oblast
