= Taratino =

Taratino (Russian: Таратино) is the name of the following rural localities in Russia:

- Taratino, Alexandrovsky District, Vladimir Oblast, a village in Karinskoye Rural Settlement of Alexandrovsky District in Vladimir Oblast
- Taratino, Petushinsky District, Vladimir Oblast, a village in Pekshinskoye Rural Settlement of Petushinsky District in Vladimir Oblast
