= Ilyinki =

Ilyinki Ильинки
- Village
- Location within Vladimir Oblast Location within Russia
- Coordinates: 56°00′N 39°32′E
- Country: Russia
- Region: Vladimir Oblast
- District: Petushinsky District
- Time zone: UTC+3:00

Ilyinki (Russian: Ильинки) is a rural locality (a village) in Petushinskoye Rural Settlement, Petushinsky District, Vladimir Oblast, Russia. The population was 12 as of 2010. There are 6 streets.

== Geography ==
Ilyinki is located 17 km northeast of Petushki (the district's administrative centre) by road. Yevdokimtsevo is the nearest rural locality.
