= Glubokovo, Petushinsky District, Vladimir Oblast =

Glubokovo Глубоково
- Village
- Location within Vladimir Oblast Location within Russia
- Coordinates: 55°53′N 39°10′E
- Country: Russia
- Region: Vladimir Oblast
- District: Petushinsky District
- Time zone: UTC+3:00

Glubokovo (Russian: Глубоково) is a rural locality (a village) in Nagornoye Rural Settlement, Petushinsky District, Vladimir Oblast, Russia. The population was 346 as of 2010. There are 7 streets.

== Geography ==
Glubokovo is located 23 km southwest of Petushki (the district's administrative centre) by road. Pokrovskogo torfouchastka is the nearest rural locality.
