= Staroye Stenino =

Staroye Stenino Старое Стенино
- Village
- Location within Vladimir Oblast Location within Russia
- Coordinates: 56°04′N 39°25′E
- Country: Russia
- Region: Vladimir Oblast
- District: Petushinsky District
- Time zone: UTC+3:00

Staroye Stenino (Russian: Старое Стенино) is a rural locality (a village) in Petushinskoye Rural Settlement, Petushinsky District, Vladimir Oblast, Russia. The population was 7 as of 2010.

== Geography ==
Staroye Stenino is located 23 km north of Petushki (the district's administrative centre) by road. Vospushka is the nearest rural locality.
