= Nerazh =

Nerazh Нераж
- Village
- Location within Vladimir Oblast Location within Russia
- Coordinates: 56°05′N 39°43′E
- Country: Russia
- Region: Vladimir Oblast
- District: Petushinsky District
- Time zone: UTC+3:00

Nerazh (Russian: Нераж) is a rural locality (a village) in Pekshinskoye Rural Settlement, Petushinsky District, Vladimir Oblast, Russia. The population was 3 as of 2010.

== Geography ==
Nerazh is located on the Nergel River, 38 km northeast of Petushki (the district's administrative centre) by road. Gospodinovo is the nearest rural locality.
