= Molodino =

Molodino Молодино
- Village
- Location within Vladimir Oblast Location within Russia
- Coordinates: 55°52′N 39°06′E
- Country: Russia
- Region: Vladimir Oblast
- District: Petushinsky District
- Time zone: UTC+3:00

Molodino (Russian: Молодино) is a rural locality (a village) in Nagornoye Rural Settlement, Petushinsky District, Vladimir Oblast, Russia. The population was 81 as of 2010. There are 2 streets.

== Geography ==
Molodino is located 34 km west of Petushki (the district's administrative centre) by road. Gorodishchi is the nearest rural locality.
