= Staroye Annino =

Staroye Annino Старое Аннино
- Village

- Location within Vladimir Oblast Location within Russia
- Coordinates: 55°56′N 39°23′E
- Country: Russia
- Region: Vladimir Oblast
- District: Petushinsky District
- Time zone: UTC+3:00

Staroye Annino (Russian: Старое Аннино) is a rural locality (a village) in Petushinskoye Rural Settlement, Petushinsky District, Vladimir Oblast, Russia. The population was 92 as of 2010. There are 17 streets.

== Geography ==
Staroye Annino is located 12 km west of Petushki (the district's administrative centre) by road. Novoye Annino is the nearest rural locality.
