= Chashcha =

Chashcha Чаща
- Village
- Location within Vladimir Oblast Location within Russia
- Coordinates: 55°51′N 39°20′E
- Country: Russia
- Region: Vladimir Oblast
- District: Petushinsky District
- Time zone: UTC+3:00

Chashcha (Russian: Чаща) is a rural locality (a village) in Petushinskoye Rural Settlement, Petushinsky District, Vladimir Oblast, Russia. The population was three as of 2010. There are 2 streets.

== Geography ==
Chashcha is located 17 km (11 mi) southwest of Petushki (the district's administrative centre) by road. Borok is the nearest rural locality.
