= Yefimtsevo =

Yefimtsevo Ефимцево
- Village
- Location within Vladimir Oblast Location within Russia
- Coordinates: 56°03′N 39°14′E
- Country: Russia
- Region: Vladimir Oblast
- District: Petushinsky District
- Time zone: UTC+3:00

Yefimtsevo (Russian: Ефимцево) is a rural locality (a village) in Nagornoye Rural Settlement, Petushinsky District, Vladimir Oblast, Russia. The population was 2 as of 2010.

== Geography ==
Yefimtsevo is located 36 km northwest of Petushki (the district's administrative centre) by road. Abrosovo is the nearest rural locality.
