= Kobyaki =

Kobyaki Кобяки
- Village
- Location within Vladimir Oblast Location within Russia
- Coordinates: 56°02′N 39°30′E
- Country: Russia
- Region: Vladimir Oblast
- District: Petushinsky District
- Time zone: UTC+3:00

Kobyaki (Russian: Кобяки) is a rural locality (a village) in Petushinskoye Rural Settlement, Petushinsky District, Vladimir Oblast, Russia. The population was 4 as of 2010. There are 2 streets.

== Geography ==
Kobyaki is located on the Laska River, 19 km north of Petushki (the district's administrative centre) by road. Yermolino is the nearest rural locality.
