= Krutovo, Petushinsky District, Vladimir Oblast =

Krutovo Крутово
- Village
- Location within Vladimir Oblast Location within Russia
- Coordinates: 55°53′N 39°25′E
- Country: Russia
- Region: Vladimir Oblast
- District: Petushinsky District
- Time zone: UTC+3:00

Krutovo (Russian: Крутово) is a rural locality (a village) in Petushinskoye Rural Settlement, Petushinsky District, Vladimir Oblast, Russia. The population was 271 as of 2010. There are 4 streets.

== Geography ==
Krutovo is located on the Klyazma River, 10 km south of Petushki (the district's administrative centre) by road. Petushki is the nearest rural locality.
