= Zabolotye, Petushinsky District, Vladimir Oblast =

Zabolotye Заболотье
- Village
- Location within Vladimir Oblast Location within Russia
- Coordinates: 55°59′N 39°07′E
- Country: Russia
- Region: Vladimir Oblast
- District: Petushinsky District
- Time zone: UTC+3:00

Zabolotye (Russian: Заболотье) is a rural locality (a village) in Nagornoye Rural Settlement, Petushinsky District, Vladimir Oblast, Russia. The population was 3 as of 2010.

== Geography ==
Zabolotye is located on the Sheredar River, 30 km northwest of Petushki (the district's administrative centre) by road. Panfilovo is the nearest rural locality.
