= Ankudinovo, Vladimir Oblast =

Ankudinovo Анкудиново
- Village
- Location within Vladimir Oblast Location within Russia
- Coordinates: 56°05′N 39°34′E
- Country: Russia
- Region: Vladimir Oblast
- District: Petushinsky District
- Time zone: UTC+3:00

Ankudinovo (Russian: Анкудиново) is a rural locality (a village) in Pekshinskoye Rural Settlement, Petushinsky District, Vladimir Oblast, Russia. The population was 216 as of 2010. There are 6 streets.

== Geography ==
Ankudinovo is located on the Peksha River, 37 km northeast of Petushki (the district's administrative centre) by road. Logintsevo is the nearest rural locality.
