= Novoye Annino =

Novoye Annino Новое Аннино
- Village
- Location within Vladimir Oblast Location within Russia
- Coordinates: 55°56′N 39°23′E
- Country: Russia
- Region: Vladimir Oblast
- District: Petushinsky District
- Time zone: UTC+3:00

Novoye Annino (Russian: Новое Аннино) is a rural locality (a village) in Petushinskoye Rural Settlement, Petushinsky District, Vladimir Oblast, Russia. The population was 601 as of 2010. There are 18 streets.

== Geography ==
Novoye Annino is located 11 km west of Petushki (the district's administrative centre) by road. Leonovo is the nearest rural locality.
