= Veselovo =

Veselovo Веселово
- Village
- Location within Vladimir Oblast Location within Russia
- Coordinates: 56°05′N 39°27′E
- Country: Russia
- Region: Vladimir Oblast
- District: Petushinsky District
- Time zone: UTC+3:00

Veselovo (Russian: Веселово) is a rural locality (a village) in Petushinskoye Rural Settlement, Petushinsky District, Vladimir Oblast, Russia. The population was seven people as of 2010. There are three streets.

== Geography ==
Veselovo is located on the Bolshaya Lipnya River, 25 km north of Petushki (the district's administrative centre) by road. Svintsovo is the nearest rural locality.
