= Kolobrodovo =

Kolobrodovo Колобродово
- Village
- Location within Vladimir Oblast Location within Russia
- Coordinates: 56°02′N 39°20′E
- Country: Russia
- Region: Vladimir Oblast
- District: Petushinsky District
- Time zone: UTC+3:00

Kolobrodovo (Russian: Колобродово) is a rural locality (a village) in Petushinskoye Rural Settlement, Petushinsky District, Vladimir Oblast, Russia. The population was 3 as of 2010.

== Geography ==
Kolobrodovo is located on the Kuchebishch River, 28 km northwest of Petushki (the district's administrative centre) by road. Zhary is the nearest rural locality.
