= Zhary, Petushinsky District, Vladimir Oblast =

Zhary Жары
- Village
- Location within Vladimir Oblast Location within Russia
- Coordinates: 56°02′N 39°23′E
- Country: Russia
- Region: Vladimir Oblast
- District: Petushinsky District
- Time zone: UTC+3:00

Zhary (Russian: Жары) is a rural locality (a village) in Petushinskoye Rural Settlement, Petushinsky District, Vladimir Oblast, Russia. The population was 5 as of 2010. There are 13 streets.

== Geography ==
Zhary is located 25 km north of Petushki (the district's administrative centre) by road. Kolobrodovo is the nearest rural locality.
