= Ostrovishchi =

Ostrovishchi Островищи
- Village
- Location within Vladimir Oblast Location within Russia
- Coordinates: 55°55′N 39°02′E
- Country: Russia
- Region: Vladimir Oblast
- District: Petushinsky District
- Time zone: UTC+3:00

Ostrovishchi (Russian: Островищи) is a rural locality (a village) in Nagornoye Rural Settlement, Petushinsky District, Vladimir Oblast, Russia. The population was 6 as of 2010. There are 2 streets.

== Geography ==
Ostrovishchi is located 34 km west of Petushki (the district's administrative centre) by road. Gnezdino is the nearest rural locality.
