= Kryuki =

Kryuki Крюки
- Village
- Location within Vladimir Oblast Location within Russia
- Coordinates: 56°05′N 39°18′E
- Country: Russia
- Region: Vladimir Oblast
- District: Petushinsky District
- Time zone: UTC+3:00

Kryuki (Russian: Крюки) is a rural locality (a village) in Nagornoye Rural Settlement, Petushinsky District, Vladimir Oblast, Russia. The population was 4 as of 2010.

== Geography ==
Kryuki is located 43 km northwest of Petushki (the district's administrative centre) by road. Novoye Stenino is the nearest rural locality.
