= Pokrovskogo lesouchastka =

Pokrovskogo lesouchastka Покровского лесоучастка
- Settlement
- Location within Vladimir Oblast Location within Russia
- Coordinates: 55°53′N 39°12′E
- Country: Russia
- Region: Vladimir Oblast
- District: Petushinsky District
- Time zone: UTC+3:00

Pokrovskogo lesouchastka (Russian: Покровского лесоучастка) is a rural locality (a settlement) in Nagornoye Rural Settlement, Petushinsky District, Vladimir Oblast, Russia. The population was 105 as of 2010.

== Geography ==
The settlement is located 23 km southwest of Petushki (the district's administrative centre) by road. Staroye Perepechino is the nearest rural locality.
