= Zheltukhino =

Zheltukhino Желтухино
- Village
- Location within Vladimir Oblast Location within Russia
- Coordinates: 55°55′N 39°41′E
- Country: Russia
- Region: Vladimir Oblast
- District: Petushinsky District
- Time zone: UTC+3:00

Zheltukhino (Russian: Желтухино) is a rural locality (a village) in Pekshinskoye Rural Settlement, Petushinsky District, Vladimir Oblast, Russia. The population was 11 as of 2010. There are 3 streets.

== Geography ==
Zheltukhino is located on the Peksha River, 24 km east of Petushki (the district's administrative centre) by road. Abbakumovo is the nearest rural locality.
