= Novinki, Petushinsky District, Vladimir Oblast =

Novinki Новинки
- Village
- Location within Vladimir Oblast Location within Russia
- Coordinates: 55°55′N 39°38′E
- Country: Russia
- Region: Vladimir Oblast
- District: Petushinsky District
- Time zone: UTC+3:00

Novinki (Russian: Новинки) is a rural locality (a village) in Pekshinskoye Rural Settlement, Petushinsky District, Vladimir Oblast, Russia. The population was 32 as of 2010.

== Geography ==
Novinki is located 19 km east of Petushki (the district's administrative centre) by road. Kosteryovo is the nearest rural locality.
