= Yemelyantsevo =

Yemelyantsevo Емельянцево
- Village
- Location within Vladimir Oblast Location within Russia
- Coordinates: 55°54′N 39°13′E
- Country: Russia
- Region: Vladimir Oblast
- District: Petushinsky District
- Time zone: UTC+3:00

Yemelyantsevo (Russian: Емельянцево) is a rural locality (a village) in Nagornoye Rural Settlement, Petushinsky District, Vladimir Oblast, Russia. The population was 6 as of 2010. There are 5 streets.

== Geography ==
Yemelyantsevo is located on the Volga River, 18 km west of Petushki (the district's administrative centre) by road. Marochkovo is the nearest rural locality.
