= Pernovo, Vladimir Oblast =

Pernovo Перново
- Village
- Location within Vladimir Oblast Location within Russia
- Coordinates: 55°58′N 39°09′E
- Country: Russia
- Region: Vladimir Oblast
- District: Petushinsky District
- Time zone: UTC+3:00

Pernovo (Russian: Перново) is a rural locality (a village) in Nagornoye Rural Settlement, Petushinsky District, Vladimir Oblast, Russia. The population was 22 as of 2010. There are 2 streets.

== Geography ==
Pernovo is located 25 km northwest of Petushki (the district's administrative centre) by road. Zheludyevo is the nearest rural locality.
