= Voskresenye =

Voskresenye Воскресенье
- Village
- Location within Vladimir Oblast Location within Russia
- Coordinates: 55°58′N 39°06′E
- Country: Russia
- Region: Vladimir Oblast
- District: Petushinsky District
- Time zone: UTC+3:00

Voskresenye (Russian: Воскресенье) is a rural locality (a village) in Nagornoye Rural Settlement, Petushinsky District, Vladimir Oblast, Russia. The population was 8 as of 2010. There are 5 streets.

== Geography ==
Voskresenye is located 29 km northwest of Petushki (the district's administrative centre) by road. Zheludyevo is the nearest rural locality.
