= Starye Omutishchi =

Starye Omutishchi Старые Омутищи
- Village
- Location within Vladimir Oblast Location within Russia
- Coordinates: 55°54′N 39°19′E
- Country: Russia
- Region: Vladimir Oblast
- District: Petushinsky District
- Time zone: UTC+3:00

Starye Omutishchi (Russian: Старые Омутищи) is a rural locality (a village) in Petushinskoye Rural Settlement, Petushinsky District, Vladimir Oblast, Russia. The population was 274 in 2010. There are 17 streets.

== Geography ==
Starye Omutishchi is located 12 km west of Petushki (the district's administrative centre) by road. Novye Omutishchi is the nearest rural locality.
