= Sitnikovo, Vladimir Oblast =

Sitnikovo Ситниково
- Village
- Location within Vladimir Oblast Location within Russia
- Coordinates: 55°58′N 39°34′E
- Country: Russia
- Region: Vladimir Oblast
- District: Petushinsky District
- Time zone: UTC+3:00

Sitnikovo (Russian: Ситниково) is a rural locality (a village) in Pekshinskoye Rural Settlement, Petushinsky District, Vladimir Oblast, Russia. The population was 7 as of 2010.

== Geography ==
Sitnikovo is located 20 km northeast of Petushki (the district's administrative centre) by road. Antushovo is the nearest rural locality.
