= Sushnevo-2 =

Sushnevo-2 Сушнево-2
- Settlement
- Location within Vladimir Oblast Location within Russia
- Coordinates: 55°57′N 39°46′E
- Country: Russia
- Region: Vladimir Oblast
- District: Petushinsky District
- Time zone: UTC+3:00

Sushnevo-2 (Russian: Сушнево-2) is a rural locality (a settlement) in Pekshinskoye Rural Settlement, Petushinsky District, Vladimir Oblast, Russia. The population was 94 as of 2010. There are 4 streets.

== Geography ==
Sushnevo-2 is located, 28 km east of Petushki (the district's administrative centre) by road. Boldino is the nearest rural locality.
