= Novye Omutishchi =

Novye Omutishchi Новые Омутищи
- Village
- Location within Vladimir Oblast Location within Russia
- Coordinates: 55°55′N 39°19′E
- Country: Russia
- Region: Vladimir Oblast
- District: Petushinsky District
- Time zone: UTC+3:00

Novye Omutishchi (Russian: Новые Омутищи) is a rural locality (a village) in Petushinskoye Rural Settlement, Petushinsky District, Vladimir Oblast, Russia. The population was 19 as of 2010. There are 2 streets.

== Geography ==
Novye Omutishchi is located 10 km west of Petushki (the district's administrative centre) by road. Staroye Semenkovo is the nearest rural locality.
