= Saninskogo DOKa =

Saninskogo DOKa Санинского ДОКа
- Settlement
- Location within Vladimir Oblast Location within Russia
- Coordinates: 56°00′N 38°54′E
- Country: Russia
- Region: Vladimir Oblast
- District: Petushinsky District
- Time zone: UTC+3:00

Saninskogo DOKa (Russian: Санинского ДОКа) is a rural locality (a settlement) in Nagornoye Rural Settlement, Petushinsky District, Vladimir Oblast, Russia. The population was 518 as of 2010. There are 6 streets.

== Geography ==
Saninskogo DOKa is located 45 km northwest of Petushki (the district's administrative centre) by road. Sanino is the nearest rural locality.
