= Letovo =

Letovo Летово
- Village
- Location within Vladimir Oblast Location within Russia
- Coordinates: 56°07′N 39°25′E
- Country: Russia
- Region: Vladimir Oblast
- District: Petushinsky District
- Time zone: UTC+3:00

Letovo (Russian: Летово) is a rural locality (a village) in Petushinskoye Rural Settlement, Petushinsky District, Vladimir Oblast, Russia. The population was 1 as of 2010.

== Geography ==
Letovo is located 27 km north of Petushki (the district's administrative centre) by road. Svintsovo is the nearest rural locality.
