= Marochkovo =

Marochkovo Марочково
- Village
- Location within Vladimir Oblast Location within Russia
- Coordinates: 55°54′N 39°13′E
- Country: Russia
- Region: Vladimir Oblast
- District: Petushinsky District
- Time zone: UTC+3:00

Marochkovo (Russian: Марочково) is a rural locality (a village) in Nagornoye Rural Settlement, Petushinsky District, Vladimir Oblast, Russia. The population was 13 as of 2010.

== Geography ==
Marochkovo is located 16 km west of Petushki (the district's administrative centre) by road. Yemelyantsevo is the nearest rural locality.
