= Norkino, Vladimir Oblast =

Norkino Норкино
- Village
- Location within Vladimir Oblast Location within Russia
- Coordinates: 56°02′N 39°32′E
- Country: Russia
- Region: Vladimir Oblast
- District: Petushinsky District
- Time zone: UTC+3:00

Norkino (Russian: Норкино) is a rural locality (a village) in Petushinskoye Rural Settlement, Petushinsky District, Vladimir Oblast, Russia. The population was 7 as of 2010.

== Geography ==
Norkino is located on the Bolshaya Lipnya River, 21 km northeast of Petushki (the district's administrative centre) by road. Kobyaki is the nearest rural locality.
