= Gribovo =

Gribovo Грибово
- Village
- Location within Vladimir Oblast Location within Russia
- Coordinates: 55°56′N 39°25′E
- Country: Russia
- Region: Vladimir Oblast
- District: Petushinsky District
- Time zone: UTC+3:00

Gribovo (Russian: Грибово) is a rural locality (a village) in Petushinskoye Rural Settlement, Petushinsky District, Vladimir Oblast, Russia. The population was 44 as of 2010. There are 3 streets.

== Geography ==
Gribovo is located 14 km northwest of Petushki (the district's administrative centre) by road. Staroye Annino is the nearest rural locality.
