= Yevdokimtsevo =

Yevdokimtsevo Евдокимцево
- Village
- Location within Vladimir Oblast Location within Russia
- Coordinates: 56°00′N 39°30′E
- Country: Russia
- Region: Vladimir Oblast
- District: Petushinsky District
- Time zone: UTC+3:00

Yevdokimtsevo (Russian: Евдокимцево) is a rural locality (a village) in Petushinskoye Rural Settlement, Petushinsky District, Vladimir Oblast, Russia. The population was 7 as of 2010. There are 2 streets.

== Geography ==
Yevdokimtsevo is located 14 km north of Petushki (the district's administrative centre) by road. Ilyinki is the nearest rural locality.
