= Andreyevskoye, Petushinsky District, Vladimir Oblast =

Andreyevskoye Андреевское
- Selo
- Location within Vladimir Oblast Location within Russia
- Coordinates: 56°01′N 39°39′E
- Country: Russia
- Region: Vladimir Oblast
- District: Petushinsky District
- Time zone: UTC+3:00

Andreyevskoye (Russian: Андреевское) is a rural locality (a selo) in Pekshinskoye Rural Settlement, Petushinsky District, Vladimir Oblast, Russia. The population was 183 as of 2010.

== Geography ==
Andreyevskoye is located on the left bank of the Peksha River, 29 km northeast of Petushki (the district's administrative centre) by road. Larionovo is the nearest rural locality.
