= Rusanovo =

Rusanovo Русаново
- Village
- Location within Vladimir Oblast Location within Russia
- Coordinates: 56°04′N 39°09′E
- Country: Russia
- Region: Vladimir Oblast
- District: Petushinsky District
- Time zone: UTC+3:00

Rusanovo (Russian: Русаново) is a rural locality in Nagornoye Rural Settlement, Petushinsky District, Vladimir Oblast, Russia. The population was 3 as of 2010.

== Geography ==
Rusanovo is located 41 km northwest of Petushki (the district's administrative centre) by road. Iroshnikovo is the nearest rural locality.
