= Vospushka =

Vospushka Воспушка
- Village
- Location within Vladimir Oblast Location within Russia
- Coordinates: 56°04′25″N 39°26′57″E
- Country: Russia
- Region: Vladimir Oblast
- District: Petushinsky District
- Time zone: UTC+3:00

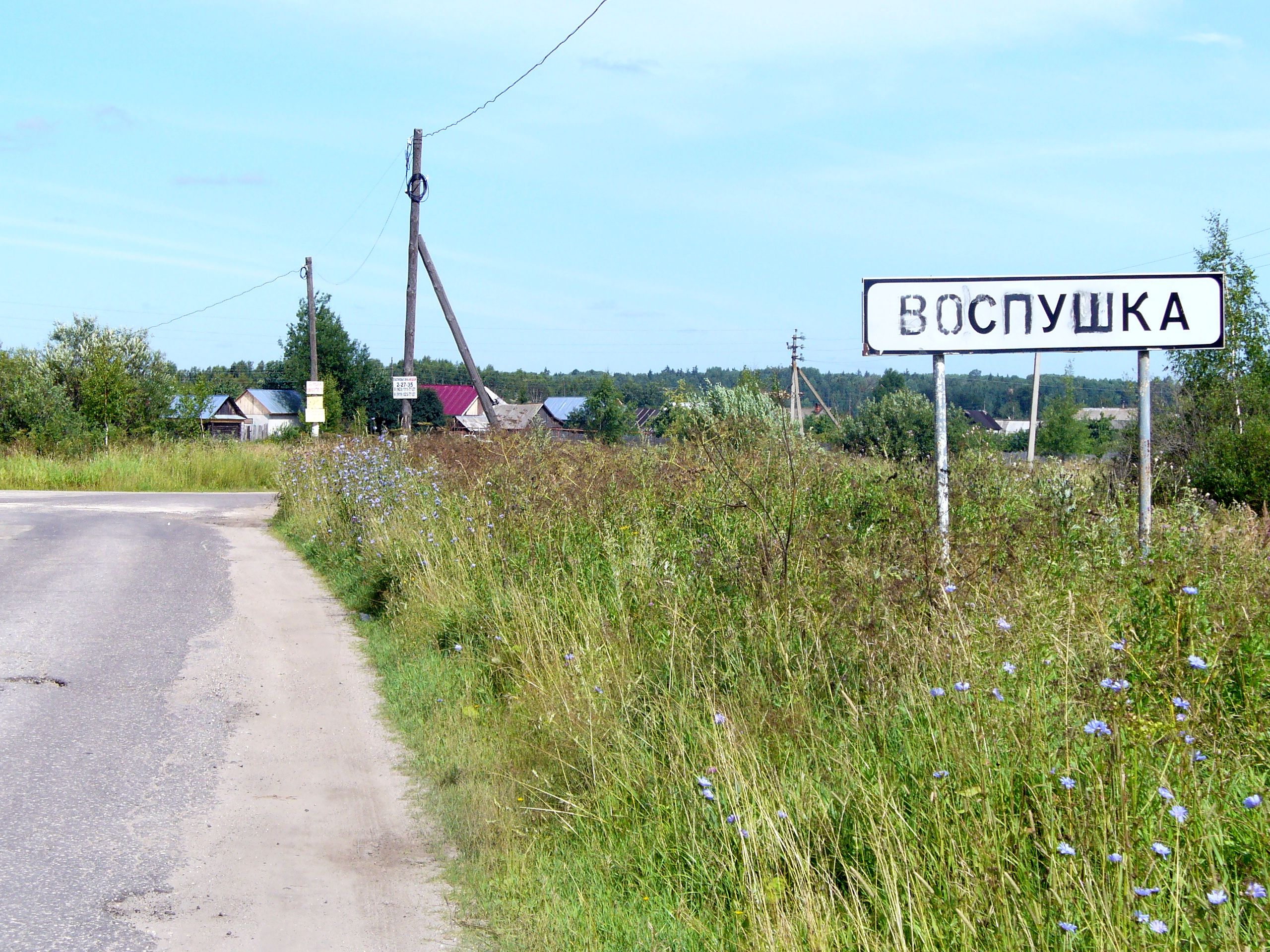
Pano view of this locality.

Vospushka (Russian: Воспушка) is a rural locality (a village) in Petushinskoye Rural Settlement, Petushinsky District, Vladimir Oblast, Russia. The population was 606 as of 2010. There are 9 streets.

== Geography ==
Vospushka is located 23 km north of Petushki (the district's administrative centre) by road. Staroye Stenino is the nearest rural locality.
