= Bogdarnya =

Bogdarnya Богдарня
- Village
- Location within Vladimir Oblast Location within Russia
- Coordinates: 55°52′N 39°21′E
- Country: Russia
- Region: Vladimir Oblast
- District: Petushinsky District
- Time zone: UTC+3:00

Bogdarnya (Russian: Богдарня) is a rural locality (a village) in Petushinskoye Rural Settlement, Petushinsky District, Vladimir Oblast, Russia. It had a population of 20 as of 2010. There are 3 streets.

== Geography ==
Bogdarnya is located on the Bogdarinskoye Lake, 16 km southwest of Petushki (the district's administrative centre) by road. Borok is the nearest rural locality.
