= Kuzyayevo =

Kuzyayevo Кузяево
- Village
- Location within Vladimir Oblast Location within Russia
- Coordinates: 56°07′N 39°27′E
- Country: Russia
- Region: Vladimir Oblast
- District: Petushinsky District
- Time zone: UTC+3:00

Kuzyayevo (Russian: Кузяево) is a rural locality (a village) in Petushinskoye Rural Settlement, Petushinsky District, Vladimir Oblast, Russia. The population was 1 as of 2010.

== Geography ==
Kuzyayevo is located 27 km north of Petushki (the district's administrative centre) by road. Nazarovo is the nearest rural locality.
