= Logintsevo =

Logintsevo Логинцево
- Village
- Location within Vladimir Oblast Location within Russia
- Coordinates: 56°04′N 39°36′E
- Country: Russia
- Region: Vladimir Oblast
- District: Petushinsky District
- Time zone: UTC+3:00

Logintsevo (Russian: Логинцево) is a rural locality (a village) in Pekshinskoye Rural Settlement, Petushinsky District, Vladimir Oblast, Russia. The population was 6 as of 2010.

== Geography ==
Logintsevo is located on the Somsha River, 38 km northeast of Petushki (the district's administrative centre) by road. Ankudinovo is the nearest rural locality.
