= Naputnovo =

Naputnovo Напутново
- Village
- Location within Vladimir Oblast Location within Russia
- Coordinates: 55°54′N 39°42′E
- Country: Russia
- Region: Vladimir Oblast
- District: Petushinsky District
- Time zone: UTC+3:00

Naputnovo (Russian: Напутново) is a rural locality (a village) in Pekshinskoye Rural Settlement, Petushinsky District, Vladimir Oblast, Russia. The population was 26 as of 2010. There are 7 streets.

== Geography ==
Naputnovo is located on the Peksha River, 25 km east of Petushki (the district's administrative centre) by road. Abbakumovo is the nearest rural locality.
