= Repikhovo =

Repikhovo Репихово
- Village
- Location within Vladimir Oblast Location within Russia
- Coordinates: 55°53′N 39°07′E
- Country: Russia
- Region: Vladimir Oblast
- District: Petushinsky District
- Time zone: UTC+3:00

Repikhovo (Russian: Репихово) is a rural locality (a village) in Nagornoye Rural Settlement, Petushinsky District, Vladimir Oblast, Russia. The population was 22 as of 2010. There are 2 streets.

== Geography ==
Repikhovo is located 26 km west of Petushki (the district's administrative centre) by road. Molodino is the nearest rural locality.
