= Novy Spas =

Novy Spas Новый Спас
- Village
- Location within Vladimir Oblast Location within Russia
- Coordinates: 55°59′N 39°19′E
- Country: Russia
- Region: Vladimir Oblast
- District: Petushinsky District
- Time zone: UTC+3:00

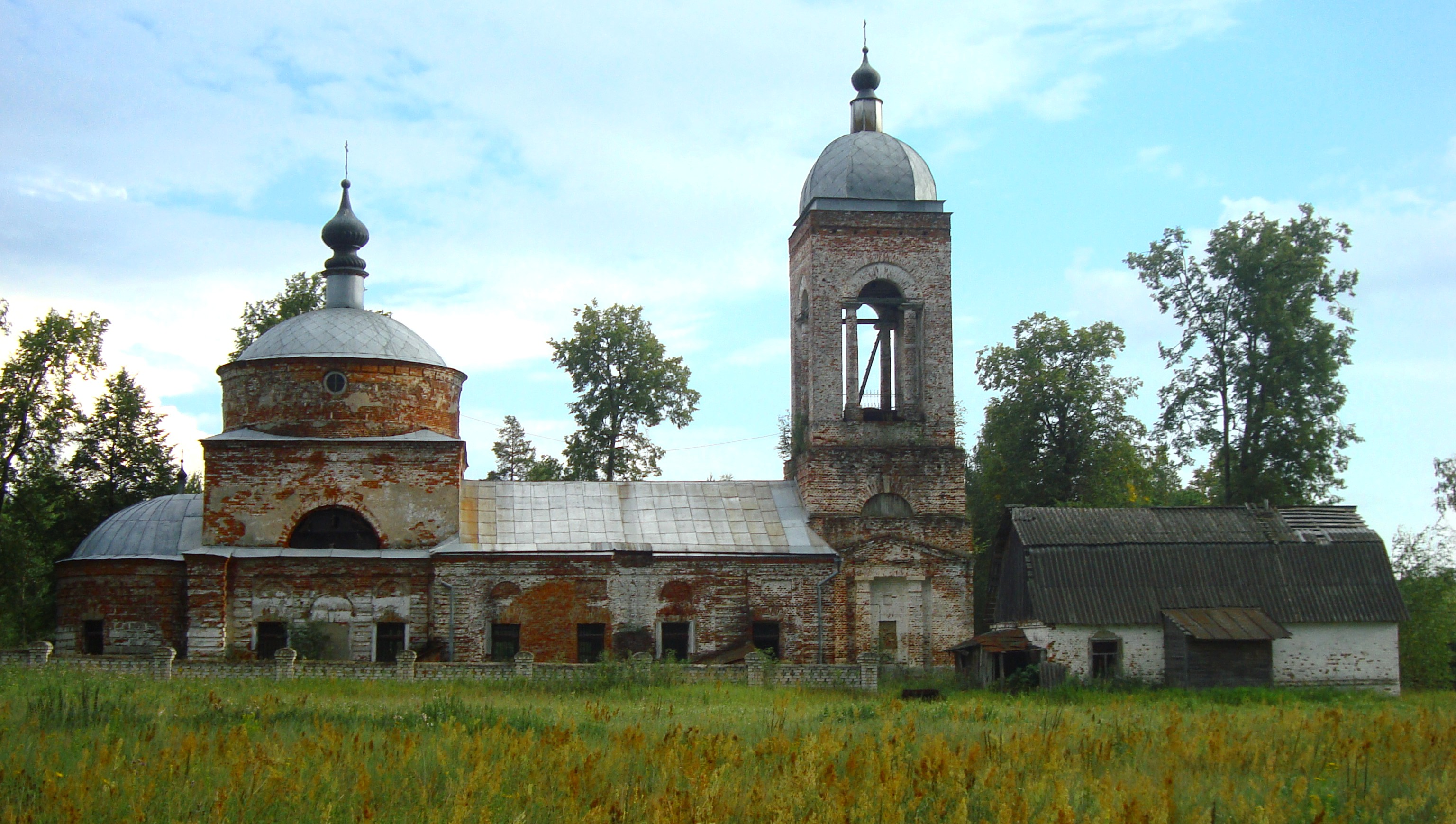
Transfiguration church in Novy Spas, Vladimir oblast, Russia

Novy Spas (Russian: Новый Спас) is a rural locality (a village) in Petushinskoye Rural Settlement, Petushinsky District, Vladimir Oblast, Russia. The population was 7 as of 2010. There are 4 streets.

== Geography ==
Novy Spas is located on the left bank of the Slezikha River, 20 km northwest of Petushki (the district's administrative centre) by road. Kostino is the nearest rural locality.
