= Tuykovo =

Tuykovo Туйково
- Village
- Location within Vladimir Oblast Location within Russia
- Coordinates: 56°06′N 39°32′E
- Country: Russia
- Region: Vladimir Oblast
- District: Petushinsky District
- Time zone: UTC+3:00

Tuykovo (Russian: Туйково) is a rural locality (a village) in Pekshinskoye Rural Settlement, Petushinsky District, Vladimir Oblast, Russia. The population was 7 as of 2010.

== Geography ==
Tuykovo is located on the Peksha River, 30 km northeast of Petushki (the district's administrative centre) by road. Vypolzovo is the nearest rural locality.
