= Teleshovo =

Teleshovo Телешово
- Village
- Location within Vladimir Oblast Location within Russia
- Coordinates: 56°05′N 39°10′E
- Country: Russia
- Region: Vladimir Oblast
- District: Petushinsky District
- Time zone: UTC+3:00

Teleshovo (Russian: Телешово) is a rural locality (a village) in Nagornoye Rural Settlement, Petushinsky District, Vladimir Oblast, Russia. The population was 3 as of 2010.

== Geography ==
Teleshovo is located on the Voleshka River, 41 km northwest of Petushki (the district's administrative centre) by road. Stepanovo is the nearest rural locality.
