= Kalinino, Petushinsky District, Vladimir Oblast =

Kalinino Калинино
- Village
- Location within Vladimir Oblast Location within Russia
- Coordinates: 56°07′N 39°32′E
- Country: Russia
- Region: Vladimir Oblast
- District: Petushinsky District
- Time zone: UTC+3:00

Kalinino (Russian: Калинино) is a rural locality (a village) in Pekshinskoye Rural Settlement, Petushinsky District, Vladimir Oblast, Russia. The population was 6 as of 2010.

== Geography ==
Kalinino is located on the Peksha River, 31 km northeast of Petushki (the district's administrative centre) by road. Tuykovo is the nearest rural locality.
