= Gnezdino =

Gnezdino Гнездино
- Village
- Location within Vladimir Oblast Location within Russia
- Coordinates: 55°55′N 39°01′E
- Country: Russia
- Region: Vladimir Oblast
- District: Petushinsky District
- Time zone: UTC+3:00

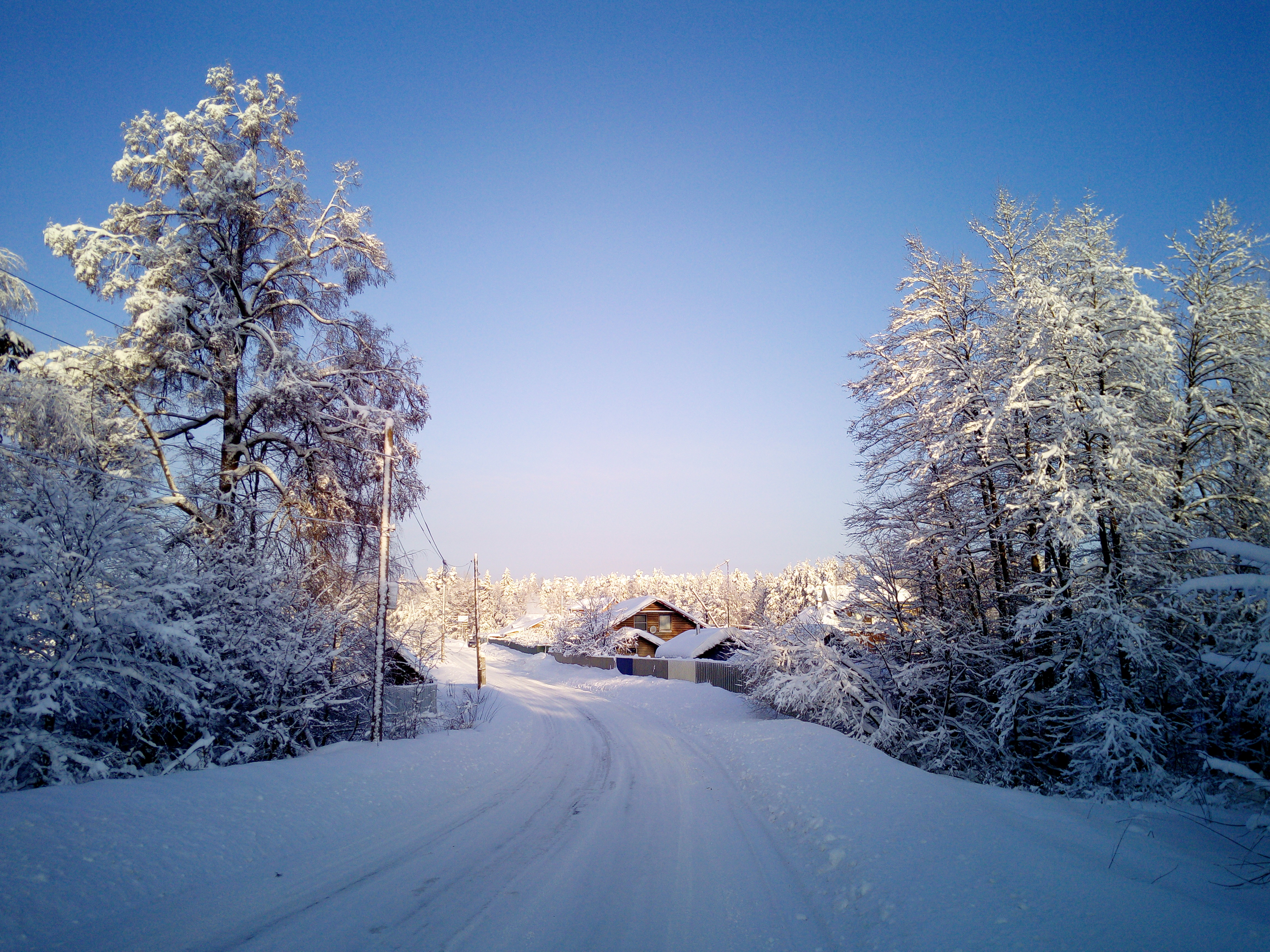
Gnezdino village, Petushinsky District, Vladimir Oblast, Russia (2018)

Gnezdino (Russian: Гнездино) is a rural locality (a village) in Nagornoye Rural Settlement, Petushinsky District, Vladimir Oblast, Russia. The population was 1 as of 2010. There are 2 streets.

== Geography ==
Gnezdino is located 34 km west of Petushki (the district's administrative centre) by road. Kilekshino is the nearest rural locality.
