= Sukovatovo =

Sukovatovo Суковатово
- Village
- Location within Vladimir Oblast Location within Russia
- Coordinates: 56°01′N 39°45′E
- Country: Russia
- Region: Vladimir Oblast
- District: Petushinsky District
- Time zone: UTC+3:00

Sukovatovo (Russian: Суковатово) is a rural locality (a village) in Pekshinskoye Rural Settlement, Petushinsky District, Vladimir Oblast, Russia. The population was 2 as of 2010.

== Geography ==
Sukovatovo is located 31 km northeast of Petushki (the district's administrative centre) by road. Bliznetsy is the nearest rural locality.
