= Pakhomovo =

Pakhomovo Пахомово
- Village
- Location within Vladimir Oblast Location within Russia
- Coordinates: 56°03′N 39°42′E
- Country: Russia
- Region: Vladimir Oblast
- District: Petushinsky District
- Time zone: UTC+3:00

Pakhomovo (Russian: Пахомово) is a rural locality (a village) in Pekshinskoye Rural Settlement, Petushinsky District, Vladimir Oblast, Russia. The population was 205 as of 2010.

== Geography ==
Pakhomovo is located on the Nergel River, 33 km northeast of Petushki (the district's administrative centre) by road. Denisovo is the nearest rural locality.
