= Kukushkino =

Kukushkino Кукушкино
- Village
- Location within Vladimir Oblast Location within Russia
- Coordinates: 55°56′N 39°40′E
- Country: Russia
- Region: Vladimir Oblast
- District: Petushinsky District
- Time zone: UTC+3:00

Kukushkino (Russian: Кукушкино) is a rural locality (a village) in Pekshinskoye Rural Settlement, Petushinsky District, Vladimir Oblast, Russia. The population was 26 as of 2010. There are 5 streets.

== Geography ==
Kukushkino is located 20 km east of Petushki (the district's administrative centre) by road. Kosteryovo is the nearest rural locality.
