= Myachikovo =

Myachikovo Мячиково
- Village
- Location within Vladimir Oblast Location within Russia
- Coordinates: 56°04′N 39°16′E
- Country: Russia
- Region: Vladimir Oblast
- District: Petushinsky District
- Time zone: UTC+3:00

Myachikovo (Russian: Мячиково) is a rural locality (a village) in Nagornoye Rural Settlement, Petushinsky District, Vladimir Oblast, Russia. The population was 28 as of 2010.

== Geography ==
Myachikovo is located 40 km northwest of Petushki (the district's administrative centre) by road. Abrosovo is the nearest rural locality.
