= Klyazmensky =

Klyazmensky Клязьменский
- Settlement
- Location within Vladimir Oblast Location within Russia
- Coordinates: 55°52′N 39°27′E
- Country: Russia
- Region: Vladimir Oblast
- District: Petushinsky District
- Time zone: UTC+3:00

Klyazmensky (Russian: Клязьменский) is a rural locality (a settlement) in Petushinskoye Rural Settlement, Petushinsky District, Vladimir Oblast, Russia. The population was 169 as of 2010. There is 1 street.

== Geography ==
The village is located 7 km south from Petushki.
