= Zadneye Pole =

Zadneye Pole Заднее Поле
- Village
- Location within Vladimir Oblast Location within Russia
- Coordinates: 55°54′N 39°04′E
- Country: Russia
- Region: Vladimir Oblast
- District: Petushinsky District
- Time zone: UTC+3:00

Zadneye Pole (Russian: Заднее Поле) is a rural locality (a village) in Nagornoye Rural Settlement, Petushinsky District, Vladimir Oblast, Russia. The population was 29 as of 2010. There are 6 streets.

== Geography ==
Zadneye Pole is located 32 km west of Petushki (the district's administrative centre) by road. Kirzhach is the nearest rural locality.
