= Vetchi =

Vetchi Ветчи
- Village
- Location within Vladimir Oblast Location within Russia
- Coordinates: 55°57′N 39°00′E
- Country: Russia
- Region: Vladimir Oblast
- District: Petushinsky District
- Time zone: UTC+3:00

Vetchi (Russian: Ветчи) is a rural locality (a village) in Nagornoye Rural Settlement, Petushinsky District, Vladimir Oblast, Russia. The population was 16 as of 2010. There are 15 streets.

== Geography ==
Vetchi is located on the Kirzhach River, 37 km northwest of Petushki (the district's administrative centre) by road. Krasny Luch is the nearest rural locality.
