= Myshlino =

Myshlino Мышлино
- Village
- Location within Vladimir Oblast Location within Russia
- Coordinates: 56°07′N 39°34′E
- Country: Russia
- Region: Vladimir Oblast
- District: Petushinsky District
- Time zone: UTC+3:00

Myshlino (Russian: Мышлино) is a rural locality (a village) in Pekshinskoye Rural Settlement, Petushinsky District, Vladimir Oblast, Russia. The population was 7 as of 2010.

== Geography ==
Myshlino is located 35 km northeast of Petushki (the district's administrative centre) by road. Markovo is the nearest rural locality.
