= Domashnevo =

Domashnevo Домашнево
- Village
- Location within Vladimir Oblast Location within Russia
- Coordinates: 55°52′N 39°10′E
- Country: Russia
- Region: Vladimir Oblast
- District: Petushinsky District
- Time zone: UTC+3:00

Domashnevo (Russian: Домашнево) is a rural locality (a village) in Nagornoye Rural Settlement, Petushinsky District, Vladimir Oblast, Russia. The population was 29 as of 2010. There are 3 streets.

== Geography ==
Domashnevo is located on the Klyazma River, 26 km southwest of Petushki (the district's administrative centre) by road. Lugovoy is the nearest rural locality.
