= Starye Petushki =

Starye Petushki Старые Петушки
- Village
- Location within Vladimir Oblast Location within Russia
- Coordinates: 55°56′N 39°28′E
- Country: Russia
- Region: Vladimir Oblast
- District: Petushinsky District
- Time zone: UTC+3:00

Starye Petushki (Russian: Старые Петушки) is a rural locality (a village) and the administrative center of Petushinskoye Rural Settlement, Petushinsky District, Vladimir Oblast, Russia. The population was 445 as of 2010. There are 5 streets.

== Geography ==
Starye Petushki is located 5 km northeast of Petushki (the district's administrative centre) by road. Petushki is the nearest rural locality.
