= Gorushka =

Gorushka Горушка
- Village
- Location within Vladimir Oblast Location within Russia
- Coordinates: 55°57′N 39°24′E
- Country: Russia
- Region: Vladimir Oblast
- District: Petushinsky District
- Time zone: UTC+3:00

Gorushka (Russian: Горушка) is a rural locality (a village) in Petushinskoye Rural Settlement, Petushinsky District, Vladimir Oblast, Russia. The population was 22 as of 2010. There are 12 streets.

== Geography ==
Gorushka is located 14 km northwest of Petushki (the district's administrative centre) by road. Saroye Annino is the nearest rural locality.
