= Mikheytsevo =

Mikheytsevo Михейцево
- Village
- Location within Vladimir Oblast Location within Russia
- Coordinates: 55°58′N 39°38′E
- Country: Russia
- Region: Vladimir Oblast
- District: Petushinsky District
- Time zone: UTC+3:00

Mikheytsevo (Russian: Михейцево) is a rural locality (a village) in Pekshinskoye Rural Settlement, Petushinsky District, Vladimir Oblast, Russia. The population was 37 as of 2010. There are 9 streets.

== Geography ==
Mikheytsevo is located 17 km northeast of Petushki (the district's administrative centre) by road. Lipna is the nearest rural locality.
