= Barskovo =

Barskovo Барсково
- Village
- Location within Vladimir Oblast Location within Russia
- Coordinates: 56°00′N 39°00′E
- Country: Russia
- Region: Vladimir Oblast
- District: Petushinsky District
- Time zone: UTC+3:00

Barskovo (Russian: Барсково) is a rural locality (a village) in Nagornoye Rural Settlement, Petushinsky District, Vladimir Oblast, Russia. The population was 3 as of 2010. There are 3 streets.

== Geography ==
Barskovo is located 41 km northwest of Petushki (the district's administrative centre) by road. Voronovo is the nearest rural locality.
