= Shibotovo =

Shibotovo Шиботово
- Village
- Location within Vladimir Oblast Location within Russia
- Coordinates: 56°00′N 38°56′E
- Country: Russia
- Region: Vladimir Oblast
- District: Petushinsky District
- Time zone: UTC+3:00

Shibotovo (Russian: Шиботово) is a rural locality (a village) in Nagornoye Rural Settlement, Petushinsky District, Vladimir Oblast, Russia. The population was 5 as of 2010. There are 6 streets.

== Geography ==
Shibotovo is located on the Dogadka Lake, 46 km northwest of Petushki (the district's administrative centre) by road. Sanino is the nearest rural locality.
