= Rodionovo =

Rodionovo Родионово
- Village
- Location within Vladimir Oblast Location within Russia
- Coordinates: 55°59′N 38°57′E
- Country: Russia
- Region: Vladimir Oblast
- District: Petushinsky District
- Time zone: UTC+3:00

Rodionovo (Russian: Родионово) is a rural locality (a village) in Nagornoye Rural Settlement, Petushinsky District, Vladimir Oblast, Russia. The population was 7 as of 2010. There are 5 streets.

== Geography ==
Rodionovo is located 42 km northwest of Petushki (the district's administrative centre) by road. Plotavtsevo is the nearest rural locality.
