= Metenino =

Metenino Метенино
- Settlement
- Location within Vladimir Oblast Location within Russia
- Coordinates: 55°24′N 39°43′E
- Country: Russia
- Region: Vladimir Oblast
- District: Petushinsky District
- Time zone: UTC+3:00

Metenino (Russian: Метенино) is a rural locality (a settlement) in Pekshinskoye Rural Settlement, Petushinsky District, Vladimir Oblast, Russia. The population was 221 as of 2010. There are 7 streets.

== Geography ==
Metenino is located 29 km east of Petushki (the district's administrative centre) by road. Naputnovo is the nearest rural locality.
