= Tsepnino =

Tsepnino Цепнино
- Village
- Location within Vladimir Oblast Location within Russia
- Coordinates: 55°59′N 39°01′E
- Country: Russia
- Region: Vladimir Oblast
- District: Petushinsky District
- Time zone: UTC+3:00

Tsepnino (Russian: Цепнино) is a rural locality (a village) in Nagornoye Rural Settlement, Petushinsky District, Vladimir Oblast, Russia. The population was 4 as of 2010.

== Geography ==
Tsepnino is located 36 km northwest of Petushki (the district's administrative centre) by road. Barskovo is the nearest rural locality.
