= Yeliseykovo =

Yeliseykovo Елисейково
- Village
- Location within Vladimir Oblast Location within Russia
- Coordinates: 56°00′N 39°40′E
- Country: Russia
- Region: Vladimir Oblast
- District: Petushinsky District
- Time zone: UTC+3:00

Yeliseykovo (Russian: Елисейково) is a rural locality (a village) in Pekshinskoye Rural Settlement, Petushinsky District, Vladimir Oblast, Russia. The population was 12 as of 2010.

== Geography ==
Yeliseykovo is located on the Peksha River, 24 km northeast of Petushki (the district's administrative centre) by road. Yeliseykovo is the nearest rural locality.
