= Kibiryovo =

Kibiryovo Кибирёво
- Village
- Location within Vladimir Oblast Location within Russia
- Coordinates: 55°57′N 39°27′E
- Country: Russia
- Region: Vladimir Oblast
- District: Petushinsky District
- Time zone: UTC+3:00

Kibiryovo (Russian: Кибирёво) is a rural locality (a village) in Petushinskoye Rural Settlement, Petushinsky District, Vladimir Oblast, Russia. The population was 197 as of 2010. There are 9 streets.

== Geography ==
Kibiryovo is located 7 km north of Petushki (the district's administrative centre) by road. Gribovo is the nearest rural locality.
