= Polomy =

Polomy Поломы
- Village
- Location within Vladimir Oblast Location within Russia
- Coordinates: 56°05′N 39°35′E
- Country: Russia
- Region: Vladimir Oblast
- District: Petushinsky District
- Time zone: UTC+3:00

Polomy (Russian: Поломы) is a rural locality (a village) in Pekshinskoye Rural Settlement, Petushinsky District, Vladimir Oblast, Russia. The population was 7 as of 2010.

== Geography ==
Polomy is located on the Somsha River, 39 km northeast of Petushki (the district's administrative centre) by road. Filatovo is the nearest rural locality.
