= Leonovo, Petushinsky District, Vladimir Oblast =

Leonovo Леоново
- Village
- Location within Vladimir Oblast Location within Russia
- Coordinates: 55°55′N 39°23′E
- Country: Russia
- Region: Vladimir Oblast
- District: Petushinsky District
- Time zone: UTC+3:00

Leonovo (Russian: Леоново) is a rural locality (a village) in Petushinskoye Rural Settlement, Petushinsky District, Vladimir Oblast, Russia. The population was 453 as of 2010. There are 13 streets.

== Geography ==
Leonovo is located 6 km west of Petushki (the district's administrative centre) by road. Novoye Annino is the nearest rural locality.
