= Vyalovo =

Vyalovo Вялово
- Village
- Location within Vladimir Oblast Location within Russia
- Coordinates: 56°00′N 39°10′E
- Country: Russia
- Region: Vladimir Oblast
- District: Petushinsky District
- Time zone: UTC+3:00

Vyalovo (Russian: Вялово) is a rural locality (a village) in Nagornoye Rural Settlement, Petushinsky District, Vladimir Oblast, Russia. The population was 9 as of 2010.

== Geography ==
Vyalovo is located on the Volga River, 30 km northwest of Petushki (the district's administrative centre) by road. Golovino is the nearest rural locality.
