= Molodilovo =

Molodilovo Молодилово
- Village
- Location within Vladimir Oblast Location within Russia
- Coordinates: 55°55′N 39°31′E
- Country: Russia
- Region: Vladimir Oblast
- District: Petushinsky District
- Time zone: UTC+3:00

Molodilovo (Russian: Молодилово) is a rural locality (a village) in Petushinskoye Rural Settlement, Petushinsky District, Vladimir Oblast, Russia. The population was 83 as of 2010. There are 3 streets.

== Geography ==
Molodilovo is located 5 km east of Petushki (the district's administrative centre) by road. Petushki is the nearest rural locality.
