= Antushovo =

Antushovo Антушово
- Village
- Location within Vladimir Oblast Location within Russia
- Coordinates: 55°58′N 39°36′E
- Country: Russia
- Region: Vladimir Oblast
- District: Petushinsky District
- Time zone: UTC+3:00

Antushovo (Russian: Антушово) is a rural locality (a village) in Pekshinskoye Rural Settlement, Petushinsky District, Vladimir Oblast, Russia. The population was 16 as of 2010. There are 7 streets.

== Geography ==
Antushovo is located on the Bolshaya Lipnya River, 18 km northeast of Petushki (the district's administrative centre) by road. Trud is the nearest rural locality.
