= Lakibrovo =

Lakibrovo Лакиброво
- Village
- Location within Vladimir Oblast Location within Russia
- Coordinates: 56°02′N 39°05′E
- Country: Russia
- Region: Vladimir Oblast
- District: Petushinsky District
- Time zone: UTC+3:00

Lakibrovo (Russian: Лакиброво) is a rural locality (a village) in Nagornoye Rural Settlement, Petushinsky District, Vladimir Oblast, Russia. The population was 7 as of 2010.

== Geography ==
Lakibrovo is located on the Sheredar River, 37 km northwest of Petushki (the district's administrative centre) by road. Malye Gorki is the nearest rural locality.
