= Trud, Vladimir Oblast =

Trud Труд
- Settlement
- Location within Vladimir Oblast Location within Russia
- Coordinates: 55°58′N 39°37′E
- Country: Russia
- Region: Vladimir Oblast
- District: Petushinsky District
- Time zone: UTC+3:00

Trud (Russian: Труд) is a rural locality (a settlement) in Pekshinskoye Rural Settlement, Petushinsky District, Vladimir Oblast, Russia. The population was 860 as of 2010. There are 12 streets.

== Geography ==
Trud is located on the Bolshaya Lipnya River, 17 km northeast of Petushki (the district's administrative centre) by road. Antushovo is the nearest rural locality.
