= Staroye Semyonkovo =

Staroye Semyonkovo Старое Семёнково
- Village
- Location within Vladimir Oblast Location within Russia
- Coordinates: 55°56′N 39°18′E
- Country: Russia
- Region: Vladimir Oblast
- District: Petushinsky District
- Time zone: UTC+3:00

Staroye Semyonkovo (Russian: Старое Семёнково) is a rural locality (a village) in Petushinskoye Rural Settlement, Petushinsky District, Vladimir Oblast, Russia. The population was 22 as of 2010. There are 4 streets.

== Geography ==
Staroye Semyonkovo is located 12 km northwest of Petushki (the district's administrative centre) by road. Novye Omutishchi is the nearest rural locality.
