= Karavayevo =

Karavayevo Караваево
- Selo
- Location within Vladimir Oblast Location within Russia
- Coordinates: 56°07′N 39°31′E
- Country: Russia
- Region: Vladimir Oblast
- District: Petushinsky District
- Time zone: UTC+3:00

Karavayevo (Russian: Караваево) is a rural locality (a selo) in Pekshinskoye Rural Settlement, Petushinsky District, Vladimir Oblast, Russia. The population was 190 as of 2010. There are 3 streets.

== Geography ==
Karavayevo is located 32 km north of Petushki (the district's administrative centre) by road. Kalinino is the nearest rural locality.
