= Ovchinino =

Ovchinino Овчинино
- Selo
- Location of Ovchinino
- Location of Ovchinino Ovchinino (Vladimir Oblast)
- Coordinates: 56°01′59″N 39°03′08″E
- Country: Russia
- Federal subject: Vladimir Oblast
- Administrative district: Petushinsky District
- First mentioned: 1677

Population (2010 Census)
  - Total: 9
- Time zone: UTC+3 (MSK)
- Postal code(s): 601134
- OKTMO ID: 17646448301

Ovchinino (Russian: Овчинино) is a rural locality (a selo) in Nagornoye Rural Settlement, Petushinsky District in Vladimir Oblast. Population: 9 inhabitants (2010). The distance to the town Pokrov is 10,56 mi (17 km) and the distance to the town Petushki is 21,75 mi (35 km). There is Church of St. Nicholas in Ovchinino.

== Population ==
1859	1905	2010
335	476	9
