= Plotavtsevo =

Plotavtsevo Плотавцево
- Village
- Location within Vladimir Oblast Location within Russia
- Coordinates: 55°59′N 38°58′E
- Country: Russia
- Region: Vladimir Oblast
- District: Petushinsky District
- Time zone: UTC+3:00

Plotavtsevo (Russian: Плотавцево) is a rural locality (a village) in Nagornoye Rural Settlement, Petushinsky District, Vladimir Oblast, Russia. The population was 1 as of 2010. There are 9 streets.

== Geography ==
Plotavtsevo is located 43 km northwest of Petushki (the district's administrative centre) by road. Rodionovo is the nearest rural locality.
