= Yuchmer =

Yuchmer Ючмер
- Village
- Location within Vladimir Oblast Location within Russia
- Coordinates: 55°57′N 39°33′E
- Country: Russia
- Region: Vladimir Oblast
- District: Petushinsky District
- Time zone: UTC+3:00

Yuchmer (Russian: Ючмер) is a rural locality (a village) in Pekshinskoye Rural Settlement, Petushinsky District, Vladimir Oblast, Russia. The population was 78 as of 2010. There are 7 streets.

== Geography ==
Yuchmer is located 13 km northeast of Petushki (the district's administrative centre) by road. Sitnikovo is the nearest rural locality.
