= Staroye Perepechino =

Staroye Perepechino Старое Перепечино
- Village
- Location within Vladimir Oblast Location within Russia
- Coordinates: 55°53′N 39°12′E
- Country: Russia
- Region: Vladimir Oblast
- District: Petushinsky District
- Time zone: UTC+3:00

Staroye Perepechino (Russian: Старое Перепечино) is a rural locality (a village) in Nagornoye Rural Settlement, Petushinsky District, Vladimir Oblast, Russia. The population was 363 as of 2010. There are 5 streets.

== Geography ==
Staroye Perepechino is located 23 km west of Petushki (the district's administrative centre) by road. Pokrov is the nearest rural locality.
