= Sushnevo-1 =

Sushnevo-1 Сушнево-1
- Settlement
- Location within Vladimir Oblast Location within Russia
- Coordinates: 55°55′N 39°42′E
- Country: Russia
- Region: Vladimir Oblast
- District: Petushinsky District
- Time zone: UTC+3:00

Sushnevo-1 (Russian: Сушнево-1) is a rural locality (a settlement) in Pekshinskoye Rural Settlement, Petushinsky District, Vladimir Oblast, Russia. The population was 220 as of 2010. There are 6 streets.

== Geography ==
Sushnevo-1 is located on the Peksha River, 27 km east of Petushki (the district's administrative centre) by road. Zheltukhino is the nearest rural locality.
