= Mashinostroitel =

Mashinostroitel Машиностроитель
- Settlement
- Location within Vladimir Oblast Location within Russia
- Coordinates: 55°56′N 39°13′E
- Country: Russia
- Region: Vladimir Oblast
- District: Petushinsky District
- Time zone: UTC+3:00

Mashinostroitel (Russian: Машиностроитель) is a rural locality (a settlement) in Nagornoye Rural Settlement, Petushinsky District, Vladimir Oblast, Russia. The population was 72 as of 2010.

== Geography ==
Mashinostroitel is located 21 km west of Petushki (the district's administrative centre) by road. Ivanovo is the nearest rural locality.
