= Popinovo =

Popinovo Попиново
- Village
- Location within Vladimir Oblast Location within Russia
- Coordinates: 55°58′N 39°22′E
- Country: Russia
- Region: Vladimir Oblast
- District: Petushinsky District
- Time zone: UTC+3:00

Popinovo (Russian: Попиново) is a rural locality (a village) in Petushinskoye Rural Settlement, Petushinsky District, Vladimir Oblast, Russia. The population was 17 as of 2010. There are 4 streets.

== Geography ==
Popinovo is located 17 km northwest of Petushki (the district's administrative centre) by road. Chupriyanovo is the nearest rural locality.
