= Stanovtsovo =

Stanovtsovo Становцово
- Village
- Location within Vladimir Oblast Location within Russia
- Coordinates: 56°02′N 39°27′E
- Country: Russia
- Region: Vladimir Oblast
- District: Petushinsky District
- Time zone: UTC+3:00

Stanovtsovo (Russian: Становцово) is a rural locality (a village) in Petushinskoye Rural Settlement, Petushinsky District, Vladimir Oblast, Russia. The population was 3 in 2010.

== Geography ==
Stanovtsovo is located on the Laska River, 20 kilometres (12 mi) north of Petushki (the district's administrative centre) by road. Yermolino is the nearest rural locality.
