= Zheludyevo =

Zheludyevo Желудьево
- Village
- Location within Vladimir Oblast Location within Russia
- Coordinates: 55°58′N 39°07′E
- Country: Russia
- Region: Vladimir Oblast
- District: Petushinsky District
- Time zone: UTC+3:00

Zheludyevo (Russian: Желудьево) is a rural locality (a village) in Nagornoye Rural Settlement, Petushinsky District, Vladimir Oblast, Russia. The population was 21 as of 2010. There are 2 streets.

== Geography ==
Zheludyevo is located on the Sheredar River, 28 km northwest of Petushki (the district's administrative centre) by road. Voskresenye is the nearest rural locality.
