= Chupriyanovo =

Chupriyanovo Чуприяново
- Village
- Location within Vladimir Oblast Location within Russia
- Coordinates: 55°58′N 39°23′E
- Country: Russia
- Region: Vladimir Oblast
- District: Petushinsky District
- Time zone: UTC+3:00

Chupriyanovo (Russian: Чуприяново) is a rural locality (a village) in Petushinskoye Rural Settlement, Petushinsky District, Vladimir Oblast, Russia. The population was 1 as of 2010. There are 7 streets.

== Geography ==
Chupriyanovo is located 18 km northwest of Petushki (the district's administrative centre) by road. Popinovo is the nearest rural locality.
