= Staroye Seltso =

Staroye Seltso Старое Сельцо
- Village
- Location within Vladimir Oblast Location within Russia
- Coordinates: 56°01′N 38°58′E
- Country: Russia
- Region: Vladimir Oblast
- District: Petushinsky District
- Time zone: UTC+3:00

Staroye Seltso (Russian: Старое Сельцо) is a rural locality (a village) in Nagornoye Rural Settlement, Petushinsky District, Vladimir Oblast, Russia. The population was 6 as of 2010.

== Geography ==
Staroye Seltso is located 44 km northwest of Petushki (the district's administrative centre) by road. Barskovo is the nearest rural locality.
