= Lipna, Vladimir Oblast =

Lipna Липна
- Village
- Location within Vladimir Oblast Location within Russia
- Coordinates: 55°57′N 39°38′E
- Country: Russia
- Region: Vladimir Oblast
- District: Petushinsky District
- Time zone: UTC+3:00

Lipna (Russian: Липна) is a rural locality (a village) in Pekshinskoye Rural Settlement, Petushinsky District, Vladimir Oblast, Russia. The population was 704 as of 2010. There are 4 streets.

== Geography ==
Lipna is located on the Bolshaya Lipnya River, 15 km east of Petushki (the district's administrative centre) by road. Trud is the nearest rural locality. The Klyazma and the Oka are the most important rivers in the oblast. The Klyazma River flows from north to south and is the largest tributary of the Oka River, which flows through the oblast from southwest to northeast. These rivers are used for irrigation, transportation, and hydroelectric power generation. There are also approximately three hundred lakes in the oblast.
