= Bolshiye Gorki =

Bolshiye Gorki Большие Горки
- Village
- Location within Vladimir Oblast Location within Russia
- Coordinates: 56°01′N 39°06′E
- Country: Russia
- Region: Vladimir Oblast
- District: Petushinsky District
- Time zone: UTC+3:00

Bolshiye Gorki (Russian: Большие Горки) is a rural locality (a village) in Nagornoye Rural Settlement, Petushinsky District, Vladimir Oblast, Russia. The population was 27 as of 2010. There are three streets.

== Geography ==
Bolshiye Gorki is located 34 km northwest of Petushki (the district's administrative centre) by road. Malye Gorki is the nearest rural locality.
