= Larionovo =

Larionovo Ларионово
- Village
- Location within Vladimir Oblast Location within Russia
- Coordinates: 56°01′N 39°37′E
- Country: Russia
- Region: Vladimir Oblast
- District: Petushinsky District
- Time zone: UTC+3:00

Larionovo (Russian: Ларионово) is a rural locality (a village) in Pekshinskoye Rural Settlement, Petushinsky District, Vladimir Oblast, Russia. The population was 161 as of 2010. There are 14 streets.

== Geography ==
Larionovo is located on the right bank of the Peksha River, 28 km northeast of Petushki (the district's administrative centre) by road. Andreyevskoye is the nearest rural locality.
