= Lugovoy, Vladimir Oblast =

Lugovoy Луговой
- Settlement
- Location within Vladimir Oblast Location within Russia
- Coordinates: 55°52′N 39°10′E
- Country: Russia
- Region: Vladimir Oblast
- District: Petushinsky District
- Time zone: UTC+3:00

Lugovoy (Russian: Луговой) is a rural locality (a settlement) in Nagornoye Rural Settlement, Petushinsky District, Vladimir Oblast, Russia. The population was 162 as of 2010. There are 3 streets.

== Geography ==
Lugovoy is located 25 km southwest of Petushki (the district's administrative centre) by road. Pokrofskogo torfouchastka is the nearest rural locality.
