= Taratino, Petushinsky District, Vladimir Oblast =

Taratino Таратино
- Village
- Location within Vladimir Oblast Location within Russia
- Coordinates: 56°00′N 39°39′E
- Country: Russia
- Region: Vladimir Oblast
- District: Petushinsky District
- Time zone: UTC+3:00

Taratino (Russian: Таратино) is a rural locality (a village) in Pekshinskoye Rural Settlement, Petushinsky District, Vladimir Oblast, Russia. The population was 16 as of 2010. There are 3 streets.

== Geography ==
Taratino is located on the Peksha River, 25 km northeast of Petushki (the district's administrative centre) by road. Yeliseykovo is the nearest rural locality.
