= Boldino (settlement), Vladimir Oblast =

Boldino Болдино
- Settlement
- Location within Vladimir Oblast Location within Russia
- Coordinates: 55°57′N 39°44′E
- Country: Russia
- Region: Vladimir Oblast
- District: Petushinsky District
- Time zone: UTC+3:00

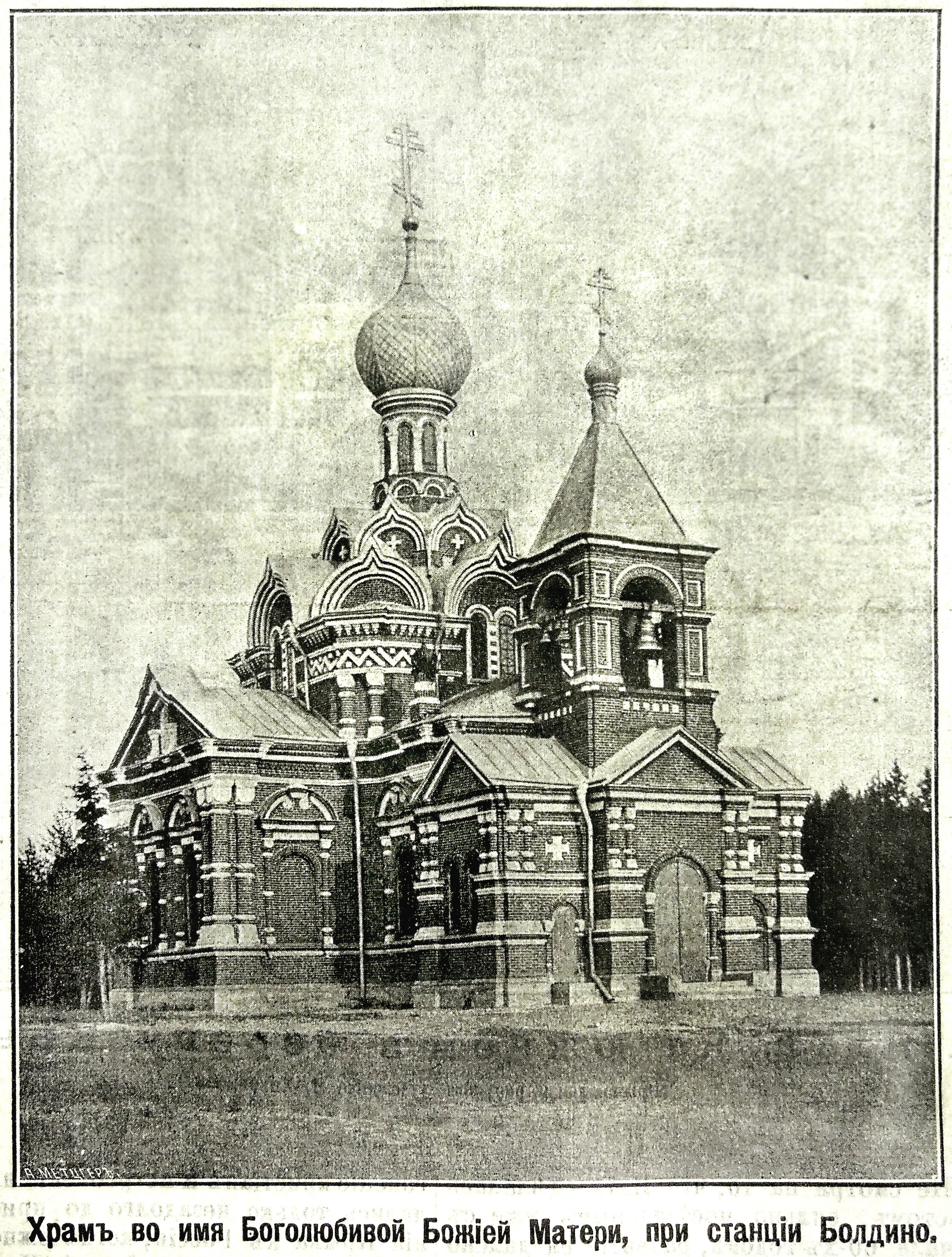
Boldino. Church of the Bogolyubskaya Icon of the Mother of God Illustrated supplement to the newspaper "Moskovsky Listok" (Moscow Leaflet), 1895

Boldino (Russian: Болдино) is a rural locality (a settlement) in Pekshinskoye Rural Settlement, Petushinsky District, Vladimir Oblast, Russia. The population was 417 as of 2010. There are 17 streets.

== Geography ==
Boldino is located 23 km east of Petushki (the district's administrative centre) by road. Peksha is the nearest rural locality.
