= Stepanovo (Pekshinskoye Rural Settlement), Petushinsky District, Vladimir Oblast =

Stepanovo Степаново
- Village
- Location within Vladimir Oblast Location within Russia
- Coordinates: 55°54′N 39°46′E
- Country: Russia
- Region: Vladimir Oblast
- District: Petushinsky District
- Time zone: UTC+3:00

Stepanovo (Russian: Степаново) is a rural locality (a village) in Pekshinskoye Rural Settlement, Petushinsky District, Vladimir Oblast, Russia. The population was 8 as of 2010.

== Geography ==
The village is located on the Muliga River, 13 km south-east from Peksha, 28 km south-east from Petushki.
