= Boldino (village), Vladimir Oblast =

Boldino Болдино
- Village
- Location within Vladimir Oblast Location within Russia
- Coordinates: 55°57′N 39°46′E
- Country: Russia
- Region: Vladimir Oblast
- District: Petushinsky District
- Time zone: UTC+3:00

Boldino (Russian: Болдино) is a rural locality (a village) in Pekshinskoye Rural Settlement, Petushinsky District, Vladimir Oblast, Russia. The population was 60 as of 2010. There are 7 streets.

== Geography ==
Boldino is located 23 km east of Petushki (the district's administrative centre) by road. Sushnevo-2 is the nearest rural locality.
