= Bolshoye Pogorelovo =

Bolshoye Pogorelovo Большое Погорелово
- Village
- Location within Vologda Oblast Location within Russia
- Coordinates: 60°23′N 41°40′E
- Country: Russia
- Region: Vologda Oblast
- District: Verkhovazhsky District

Population
  - Total: 15
- Time zone: UTC+3:00

Bolshoye Pogorelovo (Russian: Большое Погорелово) is a rural locality (a village) in Shelotskoye Rural Settlement, Verkhovazhsky District, Vologda Oblast, Russia. The population was 15 as of 2002.

== Geography ==
Bolshoye Pogorelovo is located 57 km southwest of Verkhovazhye (the district's administrative centre) by road. Maloye Pogorelovo is the nearest rural locality.
