= Denisovskaya =

Denisovskaya Денисовская
- Village
- Location within Vologda Oblast Location within Russia
- Coordinates: 60°21′N 41°38′E
- Country: Russia
- Region: Vologda Oblast
- District: Verkhovazhsky District
- Time zone: UTC+3:00

Denisovskaya (Russian: Денисовская) is a rural locality (a village) in Shelotskoye Rural Settlement, Verkhovazhsky District, Vologda Oblast, Russia. The population was 63 as of 2002.

== Geography ==
Denisovskaya is located 59 km southwest of Verkhovazhye (the district's administrative centre) by road. Garmanovo is the nearest rural locality.
