= Stolbovo =

Stolbovo Столбово
- Selo
- Location within Altai Krai Location within Russia
- Coordinates: 53°55′N 81°28′E
- Country: Russia
- Region: Altai Krai
- District: Kamensky District
- Time zone: UTC+7:00

Stolbovo (Russian: Столбово) is a rural locality (a selo) and the administrative center of Stolbovsky Selsoviet, Kamensky District, Altai Krai, Russia. The population was 841 in 2013. There are eight streets.

== Geography ==
Stolbovo is located 24 km northeast of Kamen-na-Obi (the district's administrative centre) by road. Klyuchi is the nearest rural locality.
