= Gorka-Nazarovskaya =

Gorka-Nazarovskaya Горка-Назаровская
- Village
- Location within Vologda Oblast Location within Russia
- Coordinates: 60°21′N 41°39′E
- Country: Russia
- Region: Vologda Oblast
- District: Verkhovazhsky District
- Time zone: UTC+3:00

Gorka-Nazarovskaya (Russian: Горка-Назаровская) is a rural locality (a village) in Shelotskoye Rural Settlement, Verkhovazhsky District, Vologda Oblast, Russia. The population was 14 as of 2002.

== Geography ==
Gorka-Nazarovskaya is located 61 km southwest of Verkhovazhye (the district's administrative centre) by road. Chavrovskaya is the nearest rural locality.
