= Taratino, Alexandrovsky District, Vladimir Oblast =

Taratino Таратино
- Village
- Location within Vladimir Oblast Location within Russia
- Coordinates: 56°15′N 38°32′E
- Country: Russia
- Region: Vladimir Oblast
- District: Alexandrovsky District
- Time zone: UTC+3:00

Taratino (Russian: Таратино) is a rural locality (a village) in Karinskoye Rural Settlement, Alexandrovsky District, Vladimir Oblast, Russia. The population was 4 as of 2010. There is 1 street.

== Geography ==
Taratino is located 41 km southwest of Alexandrov (the district's administrative centre) by road. Sergiyev Posad-15 is the nearest rural locality.
