= Boldino, Perm Krai =

Boldino Болдино
- Village
- Location within Perm Krai Location within Russia
- Coordinates: 57°52′N 55°59′E
- Country: Russia
- Region: Perm Krai
- District: Permsky District
- Time zone: UTC+5:00

Boldino () is a rural locality (a village) in Kultayevskoye Rural Settlement, Permsky District, Perm Krai, Russia. The population was 73 as of 2010. There are 10 streets.

== Geography ==
Boldino is located 24 km southwest of Perm (the district's administrative centre) by road. Chuvaki is the nearest rural locality.
