= Stepanovo, Kovrovsky District, Vladimir Oblast =

Stepanovo Степаново
- Village
- Location within Vladimir Oblast Location within Russia
- Coordinates: 56°26′N 41°48′E
- Country: Russia
- Region: Vladimir Oblast
- District: Kovrovsky District
- Time zone: UTC+3:00

Stepanovo (Russian: Степаново) is a rural locality (a village) in Klyazminskoye Rural Settlement, Kovrovsky District, Vladimir Oblast, Russia. The population was 12 as of 2010.

== Geography ==
Stepanovo is located 44 km east of Kovrov (the district's administrative centre) by road. Kuvezino is the nearest rural locality.
