= Dresvyanka, Chushevitskoye Rural Settlement, Verkhovazhsky District, Vologda Oblast =

Dresvyanka Дресвянка
- Village
- Location within Vologda Oblast Location within Russia
- Coordinates: 60°30′N 41°52′E
- Country: Russia
- Region: Vologda Oblast
- District: Verkhovazhsky District
- Time zone: UTC+3:00

Dresvyanka (Russian: Дресвянка) is a rural locality (a village) in Chushevitskoye Rural Settlement, Verkhovazhsky District, Vologda Oblast, Russia. The population was 4 as of 2002.

== Geography ==
The distance to Verkhovazhye is 54.3 km, to Chushevitsy is 10.5 km. Kudrino, Novaya Derevnya, Mys, Zuyevskiye are the nearest rural localities.
