= Stepanovo, Gryazovetsky District, Vologda Oblast =

Stepanovo Степаново
- Village
- Location within Vologda Oblast Location within Russia
- Coordinates: 58°42′N 40°59′E
- Country: Russia
- Region: Vologda Oblast
- District: Gryazovetsky District
- Time zone: UTC+3:00

Stepanovo (Russian: Степаново) is a rural locality (a village) in Sidorovskoye Rural Settlement, Gryazovetsky District, Vologda Oblast, Russia. The population was 4 as of 2002.

== Geography ==
Stepanovo is located 57 km southeast of Gryazovets (the district's administrative centre) by road. Polukhino is the nearest rural locality.
