= Stepanovo, Ivanovsky District, Ivanovo Oblast =

Stepanovo Степаново
- Village
- Location within Ivanovo Oblast Location within Russia
- Coordinates: 57°06′N 40°40′E
- Country: Russia
- Region: Ivanovo Oblast
- District: Ivanovsky District
- Time zone: UTC+3:00

Stepanovo (Russian: Степаново) is a rural locality (a village) in Ivanovsky District, Ivanovo Oblast, Russia. Population: 5 (2010 census);

== Geography ==
This rural locality is located 21 kilometres (13 mi) from Ivanovo (the district's administrative centre and capital of Ivanovo Oblast) and 238 kilometres (148 mi) from Moscow. Pogibeltsovo is the nearest rural locality.
