= Stepanovo, Permsky District, Perm Krai =

Stepanovo Степаново
- Village
- Location within Perm Krai Location within Russia
- Coordinates: 57°49′N 55°48′E
- Country: Russia
- Region: Perm Krai
- District: Permsky District
- Time zone: UTC+5:00

Stepanovo (Russian: Степаново) is a rural locality (a village) in Kultayevskoye Rural Settlement, Permsky District, Perm Krai, Russia. The population was 9 as of 2010. There are 7 streets.

== Geography ==
Stepanovo is located 34 km southwest of Perm (the district's administrative centre) by road. Bolgary is the nearest rural locality.
