= Yakuninskaya =

Yakuninskaya Якунинская
- Village
- Location within Vologda Oblast Location within Russia
- Coordinates: 60°22′N 41°40′E
- Country: Russia
- Region: Vologda Oblast
- District: Verkhovazhsky District
- Time zone: UTC+3:00

Yakuninskaya (Russian: Якунинская) is a rural locality (a village) in Shelotskoye Rural Settlement, Verkhovazhsky District, Vologda Oblast, Russia. The population was 11 as of 2002.

== Geography ==
Yakuninskaya is located 58 km southwest of Verkhovazhye (the district's administrative centre) by road. Fofanovskaya is the nearest rural locality.
