= Dresvyanka, Altai Krai =

Dresvyanka Дресвянка
- Selo
- Location within Altai Krai Location within Russia
- Coordinates: 53°52′N 81°20′E
- Country: Russia
- Region: Altai Krai
- District: Kamensky District
- Time zone: UTC+7:00

Dresvyanka (Russian: Дресвянка) is a rural locality (a selo) in Stolbovsky Selsoviet, Kamensky District, Altai Krai, Russia. The population was 411 as of 2013. There are 14 streets.

== Geography ==
Dresvyanka is located 17 km north of Kamen-na-Obi (the district's administrative centre) by road. Novouvalsky is the nearest rural locality.
