= Chavrovskaya =

Chavrovskaya Чавровская
- Village
- Location within Vologda Oblast Location within Russia
- Coordinates: 60°21′N 41°39′E
- Country: Russia
- Region: Vologda Oblast
- District: Verkhovazhsky District
- Time zone: UTC+3:00

Chavrovskaya (Russian: Чавровская) is a rural locality (a village) in Shelotskoye Rural Settlement, Verkhovazhsky District, Vologda Oblast, Russia. The population was 17 as of 2002.

== Geography ==
Chavrovskaya is located 61 km southwest of Verkhovazhye (the district's administrative centre) by road. Gorka-Nazarovskaya is the nearest rural locality.
