= Doroninskaya =

Doroninskaya Доронинская
- Village
- Location within Vologda Oblast Location within Russia
- Coordinates: 60°22′N 41°39′E
- Country: Russia
- Region: Vologda Oblast
- District: Verkhovazhsky District
- Time zone: UTC+3:00

Doroninskaya (Russian: Доронинская) is a rural locality (a village) in Shelotskoye Rural Settlement, Verkhovazhsky District, Vologda Oblast, Russia. The population was 18 as of 2002.

== Geography ==
Doroninskaya is located 61 km southwest of Verkhovazhye (the district's administrative centre) by road. Tatarinskaya is the nearest rural locality.
