= Garmanovo =

Garmanovo Гарманово
- Village
- Location within Vologda Oblast Location within Russia
- Coordinates: 60°21′N 41°39′E
- Country: Russia
- Region: Vologda Oblast
- District: Verkhovazhsky District
- Time zone: UTC+3:00

Garmanovo (Russian: Гарманово) is a rural locality (a village) in Shelotskoye Rural Settlement, Verkhovazhsky District, Vologda Oblast, Russia. The population was 20 as of 2002.

== Geography ==
Garmanovo is located 60 km southwest of Verkhovazhye (the district's administrative centre) by road. Gorka-Nazarovskaya is the nearest rural locality.
