= Stepanovo, Cherepovetsky District, Vologda Oblast =

Stepanovo Степаново
- Village
- Location within Vologda Oblast Location within Russia
- Coordinates: 58°58′N 37°33′E
- Country: Russia
- Region: Vologda Oblast
- District: Cherepovetsky District
- Time zone: UTC+3:00

Stepanovo (Russian: Степаново) is a rural locality (a village) in Korotovskoye Rural Settlement, Cherepovetsky District, Vologda Oblast, Russia. The population was 1 as of 2002.

== Geography ==
Stepanovo is located 69 km southwest of Cherepovets (the district's administrative centre) by road. Sosnovka is the nearest rural locality.
