= Stepanovo (Krasnooktyabrskoye Rural Settlement), Gus-Khrustalny District, Vladimir Oblast =

Stepanovo Степаново
- Village
- Location within Vladimir Oblast Location within Russia
- Coordinates: 55°27′N 40°49′E
- Country: Russia
- Region: Vladimir Oblast
- District: Gus-Khrustalny District
- Time zone: UTC+3:00

Stepanovo (Russian: Степаново) is a rural locality (a village) in Krasnooktyabrskoye Rural Settlement, Gus-Khrustalny District, Vladimir Oblast, Russia. The population was 12 as of 2010.

== Geography ==
The village is located on the Shershul River, 21 km north-west from Krasny Oktyabr, 23 km south-east from Gus-Khrustalny.
