= Afoninskaya (Shelotskoye Rural Settlement) =

Afoninskaya Афонинская
- Village
- Location within Vologda Oblast Location within Russia
- Coordinates: 60°22′N 41°41′E
- Country: Russia
- Region: Vologda Oblast
- District: Verkhovazhsky District

Population
  - Total: 15
- Time zone: UTC+3:00

Afoninskaya (Russian: Афонинская) is a rural locality (a village) in Shelotskoye Rural Settlement, Verkhovazhsky District, Vologda Oblast, Russia. The population was 15 as of 2002.

== Geography ==
The distance to Verkhovazhye is 70.5 km, to Shelota is 1 km. Petrakovskaya is the nearest rural locality.
