= Maloye Pogorelovo =

Maloye Pogorelovo Малое Погорелово
- Village
- Location within Vologda Oblast Location within Russia
- Coordinates: 60°23′N 41°39′E
- Country: Russia
- Region: Vologda Oblast
- District: Verkhovazhsky District
- Time zone: UTC+3:00

Maloye Pogorelovo (Russian: Малое Погорелово) is a rural locality (a village) in Shelotskoye Rural Settlement, Verkhovazhsky District, Vologda Oblast, Russia. The population was 13 as of 2002.

== Geography ==
Maloye Pogorelovo is located 56 km southwest of Verkhovazhye (the district's administrative centre) by road. Bolshoye Pogorelovo is the nearest rural locality.
