= Dresvyanka, Shelotskoye Rural Settlement, Verkhovazhsky District, Vologda Oblast =

Dresvyanka Дресвянка
- Village
- Location within Vologda Oblast Location within Russia
- Coordinates: 60°23′N 41°39′E
- Country: Russia
- Region: Vologda Oblast
- District: Verkhovazhsky District
- Time zone: UTC+3:00

Dresvyanka (Russian: Дресвянка) is a rural locality (a village) in Shelotskoye Rural Settlement, Verkhovazhsky District, Vologda Oblast, Russia. The population was 19 as of 2002.

== Geography ==
The distance to Verkhovazhye is 71.8 km, to Shelota is 2.3 km. Fofanovskaya, Shelota, Bolshoye Pogorelovo, Maloye Pogorelovo, Stepanovo, Tatarinskaya is the nearest rural locality.
