= Petushki, Vladimir Oblast =

Town in Vladimir Oblast, Russia

Petushki Петушки
- Town
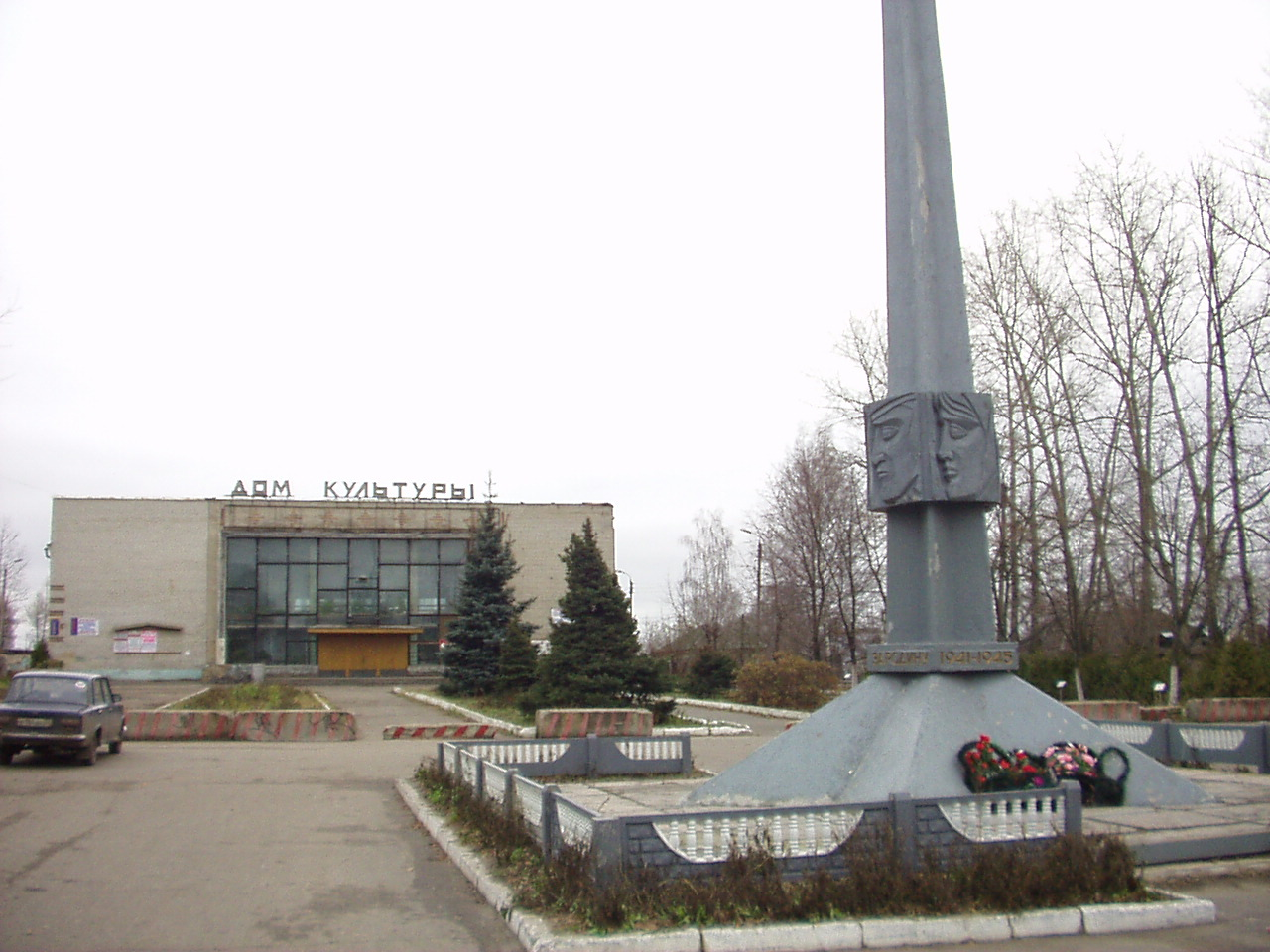
- Main square and the House of Culture in Petushki

- Coat of arms
- Interactive map of Petushki
- Location of Petushki Petushki (Vladimir Oblast)
- Coordinates: 55°56′N 39°28′E
- Country: Russia
- Federal subject: Vladimir Oblast
- Administrative district: Petushinsky District
- Founded: 1861
- Town status since: 1965
- Elevation: 130 m (430 ft)

Population (2010 Census)
  - Total: 15,148
  - Estimate (2021): 13,317 (−12.1%)

Administrative status
  - Capital of: Petushinsky District

Municipal status
  - Municipal district: Petushinsky Municipal District
  - Urban settlement: Petushki Urban Settlement
  - Capital of: Petushinsky Municipal District, Petushki Urban Settlement
- Time zone: UTC+3 (MSK)
- Postal code: 601144
- OKTMO ID: 17646101001
- Website: www.petushki33.ru

Petushki (Russian: Петушки́, lit. little roosters) is a town and the administrative center of Petushinsky District in Vladimir Oblast, Russia, located on the left bank of the Klyazma River on the Moscow–Nizhny Novgorod railway and motorway, 67 kilometers (42 mi) west of Vladimir, the administrative center of the oblast. Population: 13,317 (2021 census); 15,148 (2010 census); 16,482 (2002 census); 20,144 (1989 Soviet census).

== History ==
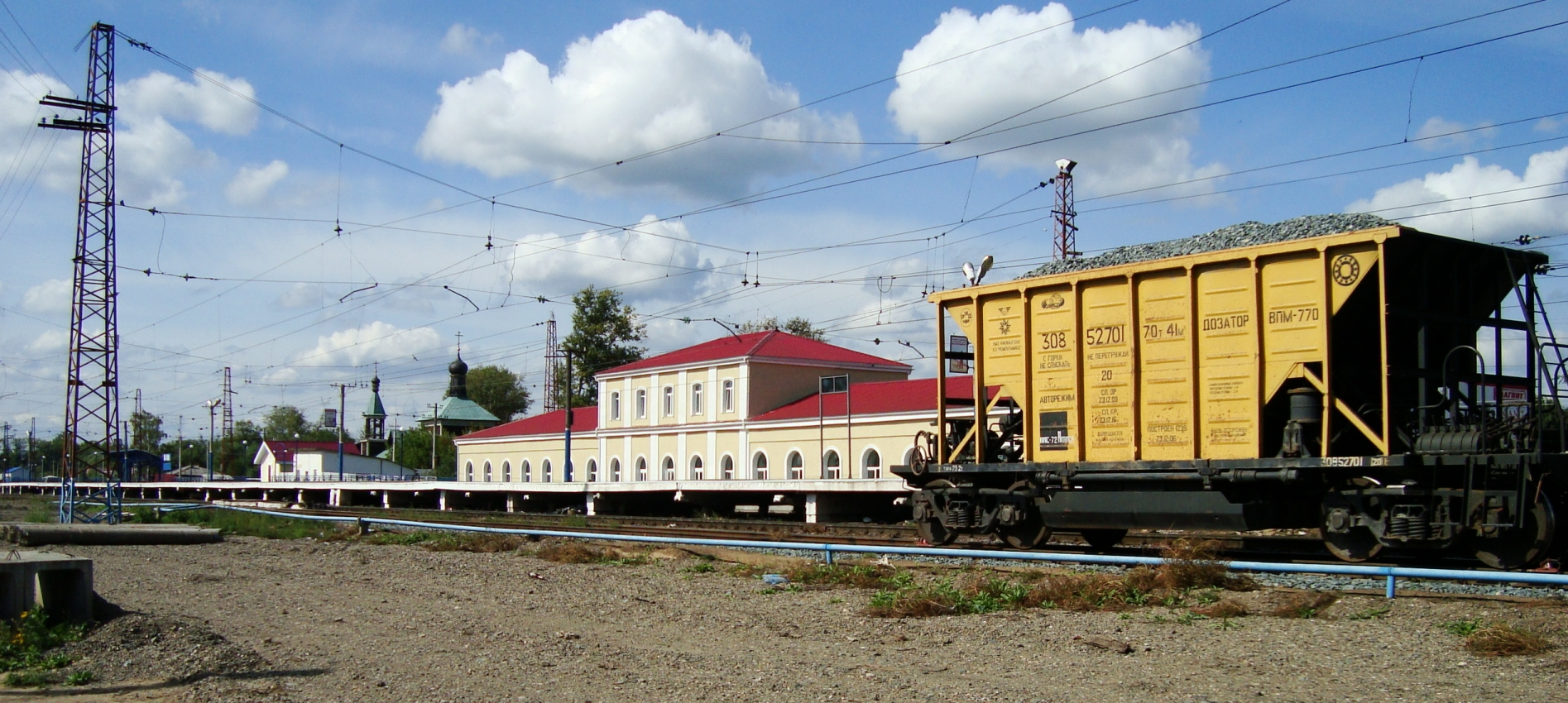
Petushki railway station

It was founded near Petushki railway station, which was opened in 1861. Town status was granted to it in 1965.

== Administrative and municipal status ==
Within the framework of administrative divisions, Petushki serves as the administrative center of Petushinsky District, to which it is directly subordinated. As a municipal division, the town of Petushki is incorporated within Petushinsky Municipal District as Petushki Urban Settlement.

== See also ==
- Moscow-Petushki, a prose poem that involves the town
