= Petushinsky District =

Petushinsky District Петушинский район (Russian)
- District
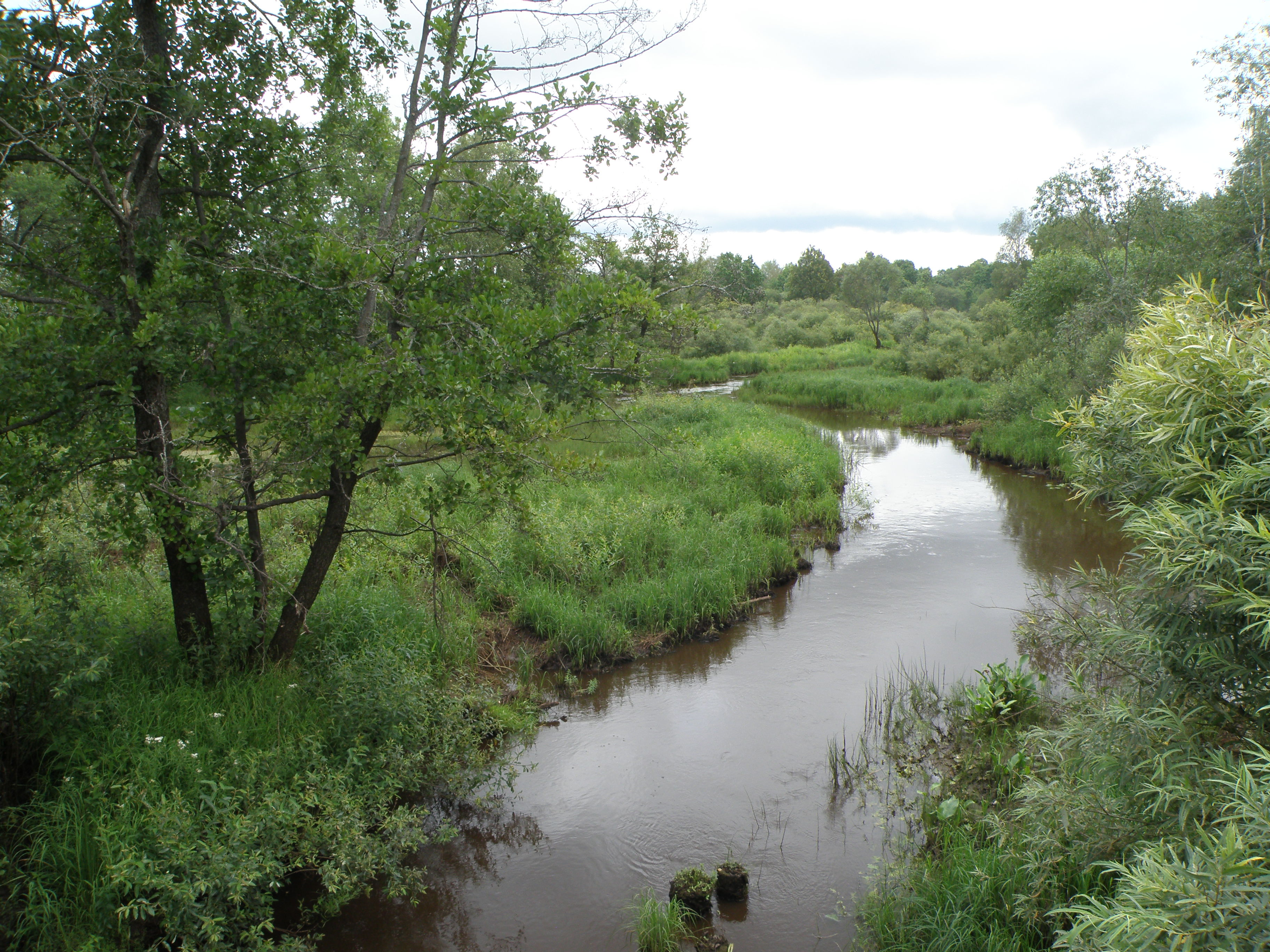
- Senga River, Petushinsky District

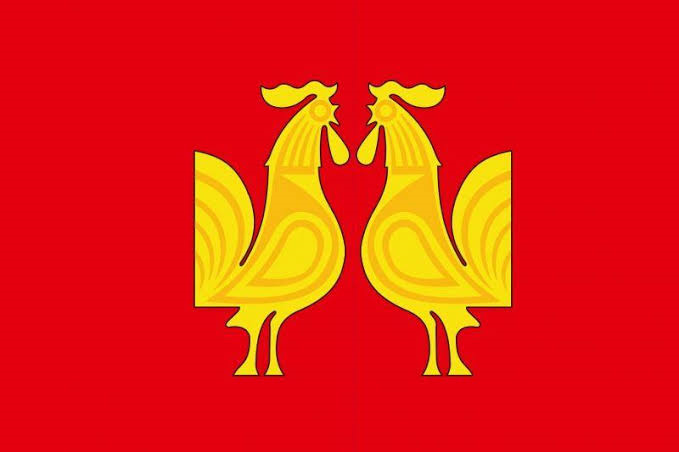
- Flag Coat of arms
- Location of Petushinsky District in Vladimir Oblast
- Coordinates: 55°56′N 39°28′E
- Country: Russia
- Federal subject: Vladimir Oblast
- Established: 12 July 1929
- Administrative center: Petushki

Area
  - Total: 1,692 km^{2} (653 sq mi)

Population (2010 Census)
  - Total: 68,062
  - Density: 40.23/km^{2} (104.2/sq mi)
  - Urban: 78.9%
  - Rural: 21.1%

Administrative structure
  - Inhabited localities: 3 cities/towns, 2 urban-type settlements, 155 rural localities

Municipal structure
  - Municipally incorporated as: Petushinsky Municipal District
  - Municipal divisions: 5 urban settlements, 3 rural settlements
- Time zone: UTC+3 (MSK)
- OKTMO ID: 17646000
- Website: http://www.petushki.info/

Petushinsky District (Russian: Петуши́нский райо́н) is an administrative and municipal district (raion), one of the sixteen in Vladimir Oblast, Russia. It is located in the southwest of the oblast. The area of the district is 1,692 square kilometers (653 sq mi). Its administrative center is the town of Petushki. Population: 59,680 (2021 census); 68,062 (2010 census); 69,364 (2002 Census); 78,498 (1989 Soviet census). The population of Petushki accounts for 22.3% of the district's total population.
