= Zakharovsky (rural locality) =

Zakharovsky (Russian: Захаровский; masculine), Zakharovskaya (Захаровская; feminine), or Zakharovskoye (Захаровское; neuter) is the name of a handful of rural localities in Russia:

- Zakharovsky, Ryazan Oblast, a khutor in Narminsky Rural Okrug of Yermishinsky District of Ryazan Oblast
- Zakharovsky, Volgograd Oblast, a khutor in Reshetovsky Selsoviet of Alexeyevsky District of Volgograd Oblast
- Zakharovskoye, Sverdlovsk Oblast, a selo in Kamyshlovsky District of Sverdlovsk Oblast
- Zakharovskoye, Kharovsky District, Vologda Oblast, a village in Kharovsky Selsoviet of Kharovsky District of Vologda Oblast
- Zakharovskoye, Ustyuzhensky District, Vologda Oblast, a village in Khripelevsky Selsoviet of Ustyuzhensky District of Vologda Oblast
- Zakharovskaya, Belosludsky Selsoviet, Krasnoborsky District, Arkhangelsk Oblast, a village in Belosludsky Selsoviet of Krasnoborsky District of Arkhangelsk Oblast
- Zakharovskaya, Permogorsky Selsoviet, Krasnoborsky District, Arkhangelsk Oblast, a village in Permogorsky Selsoviet of Krasnoborsky District of Arkhangelsk Oblast
- Zakharovskaya, Rovdinsky Selsoviet, Shenkursky District, Arkhangelsk Oblast, a village in Rovdinsky Selsoviet of Shenkursky District of Arkhangelsk Oblast
- Zakharovskaya, Yamskogorsky Selsoviet, Shenkursky District, Arkhangelsk Oblast, a village in Yamskogorsky Selsoviet of Shenkursky District of Arkhangelsk Oblast
- Zakharovskaya, Minsky Selsoviet, Ustyansky District, Arkhangelsk Oblast, a village in Minsky Selsoviet of Ustyansky District of Arkhangelsk Oblast
- Zakharovskaya, Rostovsky Selsoviet, Ustyansky District, Arkhangelsk Oblast, a village in Rostovsky Selsoviet of Ustyansky District of Arkhangelsk Oblast
- Zakharovskaya, Irkutsk Oblast, a farmstead in Bokhansky District of Irkutsk Oblast
- Zakharovskaya, Kirov Oblast, a village in Papulovsky Rural Okrug of Luzsky District of Kirov Oblast
- Zakharovskaya, Kharovsky District, Vologda Oblast, a village in Kumzersky Selsoviet of Kharovsky District of Vologda Oblast
- Zakharovskaya, Syamzhensky District, Vologda Oblast, a village in Dvinitsky Selsoviet of Syamzhensky District of Vologda Oblast
- Zakharovskaya, Totemsky District, Vologda Oblast, a village in Vozhbalsky Selsoviet of Totemsky District of Vologda Oblast
- Zakharovskaya, Morozovsky Selsoviet, Verkhovazhsky District, Vologda Oblast, a village in Morozovsky Selsoviet of Verkhovazhsky District of Vologda Oblast
- Zakharovskaya, Sibirsky Selsoviet, Verkhovazhsky District, Vologda Oblast, a village in Sibirsky Selsoviet of Verkhovazhsky District of Vologda Oblast
