= Artemyevskaya =

Artemyevskaya Артемьевская
- Village
- Location within Vologda Oblast Location within Russia
- Coordinates: 60°44′N 41°36′E
- Country: Russia
- Region: Vologda Oblast
- District: Verkhovazhsky District

Population
  - Total: 146
- Time zone: UTC+3:00

Artemyevskaya (Russian: Артемьевская) is a rural locality (a village) in Morozovskoye Rural Settlement, Verkhovazhsky District, Vologda Oblast, Russia. The population was 146 as of 2002. There is 1 street.

== Geography ==
Artemyevskaya is located 33 km west of Verkhovazhye (the district's administrative centre) by road. Silinskaya-2 is the nearest rural locality.
