= Borovaya Pustosh =

Borovaya Pustosh Боровая Пустошь
- Village
- Location within Vologda Oblast Location within Russia
- Coordinates: 60°48′N 41°42′E
- Country: Russia
- Region: Vologda Oblast
- District: Verkhovazhsky District

Population
  - Total: 18
- Time zone: UTC+3:00

Borovaya Pustosh (Russian: Боровая Пустошь) is a rural locality (a village) in Morozovskoye Rural Settlement, Verkhovazhsky District, Vologda Oblast, Russia. The population was 18 as of 2002.

== Geography ==
Borovaya Pustosh is located 28 km northwest of Verkhovazhye (the district's administrative centre) by road. Sboyevskaya is the nearest rural locality.
