= Ivoninskaya =

Ivoninskaya Ивонинская
- Village
- Location within Vologda Oblast Location within Russia
- Coordinates: 60°45′N 41°33′E
- Country: Russia
- Region: Vologda Oblast
- District: Verkhovazhsky District
- Time zone: UTC+3:00

Ivoninskaya (Russian: Ивонинская) is a rural locality (a village) in Nizhnekuloyskoye Rural Settlement, Verkhovazhsky District, Vologda Oblast, Russia. The population was 4 as of 2002.

== Geography ==
Ivoninskaya is located 35 km east of Verkhovazhye (the district's administrative centre) by road. Shchekotovskaya is the nearest rural locality.
