= Dubrova =

Dubrova is a Slavic placename. It may refer to:

- Dubrova, Croatia
- Dubrova, Chagodoshchensky District, Vologda Oblast
- Dubrova, Chushevitskoye Rural Settlement, Verkhovazhsky District, Vologda Oblast
- Dubrova, Lipetskoye Rural Settlement, Verkhovazhsky District, Vologda Oblast
