= Barabanovo =

Barabanovo Барабаново
- Village
- Location within Vologda Oblast Location within Russia
- Coordinates: 60°32′N 41°37′E
- Country: Russia
- Region: Vologda Oblast
- District: Verkhovazhsky District

Population
  - Total: 3
- Time zone: UTC+3:00

Barabanovo (Russian: Барабаново) is a rural locality (a village) in Chushevitskoye Rural Settlement, Verkhovazhsky District, Vologda Oblast, Russia. The population was 3 as of 2002.

== Geography ==
Barabanovo is located 41 km southwest of Verkhovazhye (the district's administrative centre) by road. Zuyevskiye is the nearest rural locality.
