= Basaylovo =

Basaylovo Басайлово
- Village
- Location within Vologda Oblast Location within Russia
- Coordinates: 60°30′N 41°44′E
- Country: Russia
- Region: Vologda Oblast
- District: Verkhovazhsky District

Population
  - Total: 9
- Time zone: UTC+3:00

Basaylovo (Russian: Басайлово) is a rural locality (a village) in Chushevitskoye Rural Settlement, Verkhovazhsky District, Vologda Oblast, Russia. The population was 9 as of 2002.

== Geography ==
Basaylovo is located 43 km southwest of Verkhovazhye (the district's administrative centre) by road. Chushevitsy is the nearest rural locality.
