= Bolshoye Yefimovo =

Bolshoye Yefimovo Большое Ефимово
- Village
- Location within Vologda Oblast Location within Russia
- Coordinates: 60°42′N 41°56′E
- Country: Russia
- Region: Vologda Oblast
- District: Verkhovazhsky District

Population
  - Total: 104
- Time zone: UTC+3:00

Bolshoye Yefimovo (Russian: Большое Ефимово) is a rural locality (a village) in Nizhne-Vazhskoye Rural Settlement, Verkhovazhsky District, Vologda Oblast, Russia. The population was 104 as of 2002.

== Geography ==
Bolshoye Yefimovo is located 7 km southwest of Verkhovazhye (the district's administrative centre) by road. Pyatino is the nearest rural locality.
