= Zakharovskaya, Sibirsky Selsoviet, Verkhovazhsky District, Vologda Oblast =

Zakharovskaya Захаровская
- Village
- Location of Zakharovskaya in Vologda Oblast Zakharovskaya (Russia)
- Coordinates: 60°37′N 42°42′E
- Country: Russia
- Federal subject: Vologda Oblast
- District: Verkhovazhsky District
- Rural settlement: Sibirskoye
- Time zone: UTC+3 (MSK)

Zakharovskaya (Russian: Захаровская) is a rural locality (a village) in Sibirskoye Rural Settlement, Verkhovazhsky District, Vologda Oblast, Russia. The population was 6 as of 2002.

== Geography ==
Zakharovskaya is located in the southeastern part of Verkhovazhsky District, within the basin of the Kuloy River, a right tributary of the Vaga. The village lies approximately 43.5 kilometres (27.0 mi) southeast of Verkhovazhye, the district's administrative center, and 12.5 kilometres (7.8 mi) from Yeliseyevskaya, the administrative center of Sibirskoye Rural Settlement. The distance to Vologda, the oblast capital, is 174.2 kilometres (108.2 mi).

The nearest rural localities are Aksenovskaya, Anisimovskaya, Savinskaya, Kozevskaya, and Ostashevskaya.

=== Climate ===
The area has a humid continental climate (Köppen climate classification: Dfb) with long, cold winters and relatively short, mild summers. Average temperatures in January are around −12 °C (10 °F), while July temperatures average approximately 17 °C (63 °F). The surrounding landscape consists predominantly of taiga forests, with spruce, birch, and pine being the dominant tree species.

== History ==
The area of Verkhovazhsky District, including the lands around the Kuloy River, was settled by the 13th century and was historically controlled by the Novgorod Republic before being transferred to the Grand Duchy of Moscow after the fall of Novgorod. During the administrative reforms of 1708 carried out by Peter the Great, the region was included in Archangelgorod Governorate. In 1780, this was transformed into Vologda Viceroyalty, which became Vologda Governorate in 1796.

On July 15, 1929, the uyezds were abolished and Velsky Uyezd was split into Velsky, Verkhovazhsky, and Ustyansky Districts. In 1937, following the dissolution of Northern Oblast, Verkhovazhsky District became part of the newly formed Vologda Oblast.

== Economy ==
The economy of Verkhovazhsky District is based primarily on the timber industry. Traditional agricultural activities include cattle breeding and flax cultivation, which has historically been a staple occupation of the local peasantry.

== Transportation ==
There are no navigable rivers within the district. Access to the village is by local roads, with bus services originating from Verkhovazhye. The federal highway M8, connecting Moscow and Arkhangelsk, passes through the district.
