= Pisuninskaya =

Pisuninskaya Писунинская
- Village
- Location within Vologda Oblast Location within Russia
- Coordinates: 60°38′N 42°08′E
- Country: Russia
- Region: Vologda Oblast
- District: Verkhovazhsky District
- Time zone: UTC+3:00

Pisuninskaya (Russian: Писунинская) is a rural locality (a village) in Nizhne-Vazhskoye Rural Settlement, Verkhovazhsky District, Vologda Oblast, Russia. The population was 11 as of 2002.

== Geography ==
Pisuninskaya is located 14 km southeast of Verkhovazhye (the district's administrative centre) by road. Lymzino is the nearest rural locality.
