= Klimushino =

Klimushino Климушино
- Village
- Location within Vologda Oblast Location within Russia
- Coordinates: 60°48′N 42°06′E
- Country: Russia
- Region: Vologda Oblast
- District: Verkhovazhsky District
- Time zone: UTC+3:00

Klimushino (Russian: Климушино) is a rural locality (a village) in Nizhne-Vazhskoye Rural Settlement, Verkhovazhsky District, Vologda Oblast, Russia. The population was 288 as of 2002. There are 4 streets.

== Geography ==
Klimushino is located 10 km northeast of Verkhovazhye (the district's administrative centre) by road. Vakhrushevo is the nearest rural locality.
