= Kaychikha =

Kaychikha Кайчиха
- Village
- Location within Vologda Oblast Location within Russia
- Coordinates: 60°30′N 41°51′E
- Country: Russia
- Region: Vologda Oblast
- District: Verkhovazhsky District
- Time zone: UTC+3:00

Kaychikha (Russian: Кайчиха) is a rural locality (a village) in Chushevitskoye Rural Settlement, Verkhovazhsky District, Vologda Oblast, Russia. The population was 4 as of 2002.

== Geography ==
Kaychikha is located 51 km southwest of Verkhovazhye (the district's administrative centre) by road. Dresvyanka is the nearest rural locality.
