= Nikulinskaya =

Nikulinskaya Никулинская
- Village
- Location within Vologda Oblast Location within Russia
- Coordinates: 60°26′N 41°43′E
- Country: Russia
- Region: Vologda Oblast
- District: Verkhovazhsky District
- Time zone: UTC+3:00

Nikulinskaya (Russian: Никулинская) is a rural locality (a village) in Lipetskoye Rural Settlement, Verkhovazhsky District, Vologda Oblast, Russia. The population was 31 as of 2002.

== Geography ==
Nikulinskaya is located 52 km southwest of Verkhovazhye (the district's administrative centre) by road. Kostyuninskaya is the nearest rural locality.
