= Gniluzhskaya =

Gniluzhskaya Гнилужская
- Village
- Location within Vologda Oblast Location within Russia
- Coordinates: 60°33′N 42°37′E
- Country: Russia
- Region: Vologda Oblast
- District: Verkhovazhsky District
- Time zone: UTC+3:00

Gniluzhskaya (Russian: Гнилужская) is a rural locality (a village) in Sibirskoye Rural Settlement, Verkhovazhsky District, Vologda Oblast, Russia. The population was 4 as of 2002.

== Geography ==
Gniluzhskaya is located 51 km southeast of Verkhovazhye (the district's administrative centre) by road. Yeliseyevskaya is the nearest rural locality.
