= Zveglevitsy =

Zveglevitsy Звеглевицы
- Village
- Location within Vologda Oblast Location within Russia
- Coordinates: 60°44′N 42°18′E
- Country: Russia
- Region: Vologda Oblast
- District: Verkhovazhsky District
- Time zone: UTC+3:00

Zveglevitsy (Russian: Звеглевицы) is a rural locality (a village) in Nizhne-Vazhskoye Rural Settlement, Verkhovazhsky District, Vologda Oblast, Russia. The population was 15 as of 2002.

== Geography ==
Zveglevitsy is located 17 km east of Verkhovazhye (the district's administrative centre) by road. Voronovskaya is the nearest rural locality.
