= Yeksinskoye =

Yeksinskoye Ексинское
- Village
- Location within Vologda Oblast Location within Russia
- Coordinates: 60°45′N 42°04′E
- Country: Russia
- Region: Vologda Oblast
- District: Verkhovazhsky District
- Time zone: UTC+3:00

Yeksinskoye (Russian: Ексинское) is a rural locality (a village) in Nizhne-Vazhskoye Rural Settlement, Verkhovazhsky District, Vologda Oblast, Russia. The population was 57 as of 2002.

== Geography ==
Yeksinskoye is located 3 km northeast of Verkhovazhye (the district's administrative centre) by road. Somitsyno is the nearest rural locality.
