= Cheryomushki, Vologda Oblast =

Cheryomushki Черёмушки
- Village
- Location within Vologda Oblast Location within Russia
- Coordinates: 60°45′35″N 42°03′38″E
- Country: Russia
- Region: Vologda Oblast
- District: Verkhovazhsky District
- Time zone: UTC+3:00

Cheryomushki (Russian: Черёмушки) is a rural locality (a village) in Nizhne-Vazhskoye Rural Settlement, Verkhovazhsky District, Vologda Oblast, Russia. The population was 48 as of 2002. The village was founded in 2000.

== Geography ==
Cheryomushki is located 2 km northeast of Verkhovazhye (the district's administrative centre) by road. Somitsyno is the nearest rural locality.
