= Filinskaya, Nizhne-Vazhskoye Rural Settlement, Verkhovazhsky District, Vologda Oblast =

Filinskaya Филинская
- Village
- Location within Vologda Oblast Location within Russia
- Coordinates: 60°41′N 42°04′E
- Country: Russia
- Region: Vologda Oblast
- District: Verkhovazhsky District
- Time zone: UTC+3:00

Filinskaya (Russian: Филинская) is a rural locality (a village) in Nizhne-Vazhskoye Rural Settlement, Verkhovazhsky District, Vologda Oblast, Russia. The population was 13 as of 2002.

== Geography ==
The distance to Verkhovazhye is 15.1 km, to Kukolovskaya is 3 km. Frolovskaya, Gorka, Klykovo, Pakhomovskaya are the nearest rural localities.
