= Smetanino =

Smetanino Сметанино
- Village
- Location within Vologda Oblast Location within Russia
- Coordinates: 60°38′N 41°50′E
- Country: Russia
- Region: Vologda Oblast
- District: Verkhovazhsky District
- Time zone: UTC+3:00

Smetanino (Russian: Сметанино) is a rural locality (a village) and the administrative center of Verkhovskoye Rural Settlement, Verkhovazhsky District, Vologda Oblast, Russia. The population was 524 as of 2002. There are 17 streets.

== Geography ==
Smetanino is located 28 km southwest of Verkhovazhye (the district's administrative centre) by road. Kiselevo is the nearest rural locality.
