= Yereminskoye =

Yereminskoye Ереминское
- Village
- Location within Vologda Oblast Location within Russia
- Coordinates: 60°35′N 41°26′E
- Country: Russia
- Region: Vologda Oblast
- District: Verkhovazhsky District
- Time zone: UTC+3:00

Yereminskoye (Russian: Ереминское) is a rural locality (a village) in Verkhovskoye Rural Settlement, Verkhovazhsky District, Vologda Oblast, Russia. The population was 19 as of 2002.

== Geography ==
Yereminskoye is located 16 km south of Verkhovazhye (the district's administrative centre) by road. Lymzino is the nearest rural locality.
