= Rodionovskaya, Verkhovazhsky District, Vologda Oblast =

Rodionovskaya Родионовская
- Village
- Location within Vologda Oblast Location within Russia
- Coordinates: 60°36′N 41°51′E
- Country: Russia
- Region: Vologda Oblast
- District: Verkhovazhsky District
- Time zone: UTC+3:00

Rodionovskaya (Russian: Родионовская) is a rural locality (a village) in Verkhovskoye Rural Settlement, Verkhovazhsky District, Vologda Oblast, Russia. The population was 15 as of 2002.

== Geography ==
Rodionovskaya is located 34 km southwest of Verkhovazhye (the district's administrative centre) by road. Osnovinskaya is the nearest rural locality.
