= Potulovskaya =

Potulovskaya Потуловская
- Village
- Location within Vologda Oblast Location within Russia
- Coordinates: 60°41′N 41°52′E
- Country: Russia
- Region: Vologda Oblast
- District: Verkhovazhsky District
- Time zone: UTC+3:00

Potulovskaya (Russian: Потуловская) is a rural locality (a village) in Nizhne-Vazhskoye Rural Settlement, Verkhovazhsky District, Vologda Oblast, Russia. The population was 49 as of 2002.

== Geography ==
Potulovskaya is located 18 km southwest of Verkhovazhye (the district's administrative centre) by road. Kostyuninskaya is the nearest rural locality.
