= Sludnaya =

Sludnaya Слудная
- Village
- Location within Vologda Oblast Location within Russia
- Coordinates: 60°40′N 41°32′E
- Country: Russia
- Region: Vologda Oblast
- District: Verkhovazhsky District
- Time zone: UTC+3:00

Sludnaya (Russian: Слудная) is a rural locality (a village) in Verkhovskoye Rural Settlement, Verkhovazhsky District, Vologda Oblast, Russia. The population was 119 as of 2002.

== Geography ==
Sludnaya is located 42 km southwest of Verkhovazhye (the district's administrative centre) by road. Srednyaya is the nearest rural locality.
