= Kiselevo, Verkhovazhsky District, Vologda Oblast =

Kiselevo Киселево
- Village
- Location within Vologda Oblast Location within Russia
- Coordinates: 60°37′N 41°51′E
- Country: Russia
- Region: Vologda Oblast
- District: Verkhovazhsky District
- Time zone: UTC+3:00

Kiselevo (Russian: Киселево) is a rural locality (a village) in Verkhovskoye Rural Settlement, Verkhovazhsky District, Vologda Oblast, Russia. The population was 77 as of 2002.

== Geography ==
Kiselevo is located 36 km southwest of Verkhovazhye (the district's administrative centre) by road. Smetanino is the nearest rural locality.
