= Istopochnaya =

Istopochnaya Истопочная
- Village
- Location within Vologda Oblast Location within Russia
- Coordinates: 60°43′N 42°17′E
- Country: Russia
- Region: Vologda Oblast
- District: Verkhovazhsky District
- Time zone: UTC+3:00

Istopochnaya (Russian: Истопочная) is a rural locality (a village) in Nizhne-Vazhskoye Rural Settlement, Verkhovazhsky District, Vologda Oblast, Russia. The population was 17 as of 2002.

== Geography ==
Istopochnaya is located 16 km east of Verkhovazhye (the district's administrative centre) by road. Bezymyannaya is the nearest rural locality.
