= Kharitonovskaya =

Kharitonovskaya Харитоновская
- Village
- Location within Vologda Oblast Location within Russia
- Coordinates: 60°43′N 41°36′E
- Country: Russia
- Region: Vologda Oblast
- District: Verkhovazhsky District
- Time zone: UTC+3:00

Kharitonovskaya (Russian: Харитоновская) is a rural locality (a village) in Morozovskoye Rural Settlement, Verkhovazhsky District, Vologda Oblast, Russia. The population was 48 as of 2002.

== Geography ==
The distance to Verkhovazhye is 33.3 km, to Morozovo is 9 km. Kalitinskaya, Silinskaya-2, Bushnitskaya, Ostrovskaya are the nearest rural localities.
