= Podsosenye, Verkhovazhsky District, Vologda Oblast =

Podsosenye Подсосенье
- Village
- Location within Vologda Oblast Location within Russia
- Coordinates: 60°27′N 41°46′E
- Country: Russia
- Region: Vologda Oblast
- District: Verkhovazhsky District
- Time zone: UTC+3:00

Podsosenye (Russian: Подсосенье) is a rural locality (a village) in Chushevitskoye Rural Settlement, Verkhovazhsky District, Vologda Oblast, Russia. The population was 35 as of 2002.

== Geography ==
Podsosenye is located 47 km southwest of Verkhovazhye (the district's administrative centre) by road. Kamenka is the nearest rural locality.
