= Novaya Derevnya, Verkhovazhsky District, Vologda Oblast =

Novaya Derevnya Новая Деревня
- Village
- Location within Vologda Oblast Location within Russia
- Coordinates: 60°32′N 41°39′E
- Country: Russia
- Region: Vologda Oblast
- District: Verkhovazhsky District
- Time zone: UTC+3:00

Novaya Derevnya (Russian: Новая Деревня) is a rural locality (a village) in Chushevitskoye Rural Settlement, Verkhovazhsky District, Vologda Oblast, Russia. The population was 53 as of 2002.

== Geography ==
The distance to Verkhovazhye is 40.5 km, to Chushevitsy is 7.3 km. Kudrino, Dresvyanka, Zuyevskiye are the nearest rural localities.
