= Drugosimonovskaya =

Drugosimonovskaya Другосимоновская
- Village
- Location within Vologda Oblast Location within Russia
- Coordinates: 60°40′N 42°32′E
- Country: Russia
- Region: Vologda Oblast
- District: Verkhovazhsky District
- Time zone: UTC+3:00

Drugosimonovskaya (Russian: Другосимоновская) is a rural locality (a village) in Nizhnekuloyskoye Rural Settlement, Verkhovazhsky District, Vologda Oblast, Russia. The population was 49 as of 2002. There are 2 streets.

== Geography ==
Drugosimonovskaya is located 32 km southeast of Verkhovazhye (the district's administrative centre) by road. Simonovskaya is the nearest rural locality.
