= Tyoply Ruchey =

Tyoply Ruchey Тёплый Ручей
- Settlement
- Location within Vologda Oblast Location within Russia
- Coordinates: 60°44′N 42°04′E
- Country: Russia
- Region: Vologda Oblast
- District: Verkhovazhsky District
- Time zone: UTC+3:00

Tyoply Ruchey (Russian: Тёплый Ручей) is a rural locality (a settlement) in Verkhovazhskoye Rural Settlement, Verkhovazhsky District, Vologda Oblast, Russia. The population was 569 as of 2002. There are 9 streets.

== Geography ==
Tyoply Ruchey is located 2 km northeast of Verkhovazhye (the district's administrative centre) by road. Verkhovazhye is the nearest rural locality.
