= Klyukinskaya =

Klyukinskaya Клюкинская
- Village
- Location within Vologda Oblast Location within Russia
- Coordinates: 60°40′N 42°37′E
- Country: Russia
- Region: Vologda Oblast
- District: Verkhovazhsky District
- Time zone: UTC+3:00

Klyukinskaya (Russian: Клюкинская) is a rural locality (a village) in Nizhnekuloyskoye Rural Settlement, Verkhovazhsky District, Vologda Oblast, Russia. The population was 28 as of 2002. There are 2 streets.

== Geography ==
Klyukinskaya is located 41 km southeast of Verkhovazhye (the district's administrative centre) by road. Brevnovskaya is the nearest rural locality.
