= Aksenovskaya =

Aksenovskaya Аксёновская
- Village
- Location within Vologda Oblast Location within Russia
- Coordinates: 60°37′N 42°42′E
- Country: Russia
- Region: Vologda Oblast
- District: Verkhovazhsky District

Population
  - Total: 10
- Time zone: UTC+3:00

Aksenovskaya (Russian: Аксёновская) is a rural locality (a village) in Sibirskoye Rural Settlement, Verkhovazhsky District, Vologda Oblast, Russia. The population was 10 as of 2002.

== Geography ==
Aksenovskaya is located 44 km southeast of Verkhovazhye (the district's administrative centre) by road. Anisimovskaya is the nearest rural locality.
