= Ivonino, Verkhovazhsky District, Vologda Oblast =

Ivonino Ивонино
- Village
- Location within Vologda Oblast Location within Russia
- Coordinates: 60°26′N 41°40′E
- Country: Russia
- Region: Vologda Oblast
- District: Verkhovazhsky District
- Time zone: UTC+3:00

Ivonino (Russian: Ивонино) is a rural locality (a village) in Lipetskoye Rural Settlement, Verkhovazhsky District, Vologda Oblast, Russia. The population was 30 as of 2002.

== Geography ==
Ivonino is located 48 km southwest of Verkhovazhye (the district's administrative centre) by road. Semyonovskaya is the nearest rural locality.
