= Naumikha =

Naumikha Наумиха
- Village
- Location within Vologda Oblast Location within Russia
- Coordinates: 60°45′N 42°02′E
- Country: Russia
- Region: Vologda Oblast
- District: Verkhovazhsky District
- Time zone: UTC+3:00

Naumikha (Russian: Наумиха) is a rural locality (a village) in Nizhne-Vazhskoye Rural Settlement, Verkhovazhsky District, Vologda Oblast, Russia. The population was 251 as of 2002. There are 6 streets.

== Geography ==
Naumikha is located 2 km north of Verkhovazhye (the district's administrative centre) by road. Verkhovazhye is the nearest rural locality.
