= Kostyuninskaya, Nizhne-Vazhskoye Rural Settlement, Verkhovazhsky District, Vologda Oblast =

Kostyuninskaya Костюнинская
- Village
- Location within Vologda Oblast Location within Russia
- Coordinates: 60°40′N 41°51′E
- Country: Russia
- Region: Vologda Oblast
- District: Verkhovazhsky District
- Time zone: UTC+3:00

Kostyuninskaya (Russian: Костюнинская) is a rural locality (a village) in Nizhne-Vazhskoye Rural Settlement, Verkhovazhsky District, Vologda Oblast, Russia. The population was 20 as of 2002.

== Geography ==
The distance to Verkhovazhye is 11 km, to Naumikha is 12.9 km. Potulovskaya, Kalinino, Matveyevskaya are the nearest rural localities.
