= Titovskaya =

Titovskaya Титовская
- Village
- Location within Vologda Oblast Location within Russia
- Coordinates: 60°39′N 42°34′E
- Country: Russia
- Region: Vologda Oblast
- District: Verkhovazhsky District
- Time zone: UTC+3:00

Titovskaya (Russian: Титовская) is a rural locality (a village) in Nizhnekuloyskoye Rural Settlement, Verkhovazhsky District, Vologda Oblast, Russia. The population was 6 as of 2002.

== Geography ==
Titovskaya is located 35 km southeast of Verkhovazhye (the district's administrative centre) by road. Grikhnevskaya is the nearest rural locality.
