= Khoroshevo, Verkhovazhsky District, Vologda Oblast =

Khoroshevo Хорошево
- Village
- Location within Vologda Oblast Location within Russia
- Coordinates: 60°29′N 41°44′E
- Country: Russia
- Region: Vologda Oblast
- District: Verkhovazhsky District
- Time zone: UTC+3:00

Khoroshevo (Russian: Хорошево) is a rural locality (a village) in Chushevitskoye Rural Settlement, Verkhovazhsky District, Vologda Oblast, Russia. The population was 9 as of 2002.

== Geography ==
Khoroshevo is located 44 km southwest of Verkhovazhye (the district's administrative centre) by road. Chushevitsy is the nearest rural locality.
