= Silinskaya-1 =

Silinskaya-1 Силинская-1
- Village
- Location within Vologda Oblast Location within Russia
- Coordinates: 60°47′N 41°41′E
- Country: Russia
- Region: Vologda Oblast
- District: Verkhovazhsky District
- Time zone: UTC+3:00

Silinskaya-1 (Russian: Силинская-1) is a rural locality (a village) in Morozovskoye Rural Settlement, Verkhovazhsky District, Vologda Oblast, Russia. The population was 103 as of 2002. There are 2 streets.

== Geography ==
Silinskaya-1 is located 25 km northwest of Verkhovazhye (the district's administrative centre) by road. Morozovo is the nearest rural locality.
