= Grigorovskaya =

Grigorovskaya Григоровская
- Village
- Location within Vologda Oblast Location within Russia
- Coordinates: 60°42′N 42°48′E
- Country: Russia
- Region: Vologda Oblast
- District: Verkhovazhsky District
- Time zone: UTC+3:00

Grigorovskaya (Russian: Григоровская) is a rural locality (a village) in Kolengskoye Rural Settlement, Verkhovazhsky District, Vologda Oblast, Russia. The population was 9 as of 2002.

== Geography ==
Grigorovskaya is located 62 km east of Verkhovazhye (the district's administrative centre) by road. Udaltsovskaya is the nearest rural locality.
