= Leonovskaya =

Leonovskaya Леоновская
- Village
- Location within Vologda Oblast Location within Russia
- Coordinates: 60°48′N 42°08′E
- Country: Russia
- Region: Vologda Oblast
- District: Verkhovazhsky District
- Time zone: UTC+3:00

Leonovskaya (Russian: Леоновская) is a rural locality (a village) in Nizhne-Vazhskoye Rural Settlement, Verkhovazhsky District, Vologda Oblast, Russia. The population was 14 as of 2002.

== Geography ==
Leonovskaya is located 17 km northeast of Verkhovazhye (the district's administrative centre) by road. Podgorodye is the nearest rural locality.
