= Udaltsovskaya =

Udaltsovskaya Удальцовская
- Village
- Location within Vologda Oblast Location within Russia
- Coordinates: 60°43′N 42°47′E
- Country: Russia
- Region: Vologda Oblast
- District: Verkhovazhsky District
- Time zone: UTC+3:00

Udaltsovskaya (Russian: Удальцовская) is a rural locality (a village) in Kolengskoye Rural Settlement, Verkhovazhsky District, Vologda Oblast, Russia. The population was 7 as of 2002.

== Geography ==
Udaltsovskaya is located 62 km east of Verkhovazhye (the district's administrative centre) by road. Grigorovskaya is the nearest rural locality.
