= Ruchyevskaya =

Ruchyevskaya Ручьевская
- Village
- Location within Vologda Oblast Location within Russia
- Coordinates: 60°46′N 42°04′E
- Country: Russia
- Region: Vologda Oblast
- District: Verkhovazhsky District
- Time zone: UTC+3:00

Ruchyevskaya (Russian: Ручьевская) is a rural locality (a village) in Nizhne-Vazhskoye Rural Settlement, Verkhovazhsky District, Vologda Oblast, Russia. The population was 4 as of 2002.

== Geography ==
Ruchyevskaya is located 4 km northeast of Verkhovazhye (the district's administrative centre) by road. Abakumovskaya is the nearest rural locality.
