= Brevnovskaya =

Brevnovskaya Бревновская
- Village
- Location within Vologda Oblast Location within Russia
- Coordinates: 60°40′N 42°36′E
- Country: Russia
- Region: Vologda Oblast
- District: Verkhovazhsky District
- Time zone: UTC+3:00

Brevnovskaya (Russian: Бревновская) is a rural locality (a village) in Nizhnekuloyskoye Rural Settlement, Verkhovazhsky District, Vologda Oblast, Russia. The population was 38 as of 2002. There are 3 streets.

== Geography ==
Brevnovskaya is located 38 km southeast of Verkhovazhye (the district's administrative centre) by road. Vysotinskaya is the nearest rural locality.
