= Maloye Yefimovo =

Maloye Yefimovo Малое Ефимово
- Village
- Location within Vologda Oblast Location within Russia
- Coordinates: 60°43′N 41°56′E
- Country: Russia
- Region: Vologda Oblast
- District: Verkhovazhsky District
- Time zone: UTC+3:00

Maloye Yefimovo (Russian: Малое Ефимово) is a rural locality (a village) in Nizhne-Vazhskoye Rural Settlement, Verkhovazhsky District, Vologda Oblast, Russia. The population was 10 as of 2002.

== Geography ==
Maloye Yefimovo is located 9 km southwest of Verkhovazhye (the district's administrative centre) by road. Pyatino is the nearest rural locality.
