= Mininskaya =

Mininskaya Мининская
- Village
- Location within Vologda Oblast Location within Russia
- Coordinates: 60°47′N 41°39′E
- Country: Russia
- Region: Vologda Oblast
- District: Verkhovazhsky District
- Time zone: UTC+3:00

Mininskaya (Russian: Мининская) is a rural locality (a village) in Morozovskoye Rural Settlement, Verkhovazhsky District, Vologda Oblast, Russia. The population was 17 as of 2002.

== Geography ==
Mininskaya is located 27 km northwest of Verkhovazhye (the district's administrative centre) by road. Yevsyuninskaya is the nearest rural locality.
