= Velikodvorskaya =

Velikodvorskaya Великодворская
- Village
- Location within Vologda Oblast Location within Russia
- Coordinates: 60°25′N 42°10′E
- Country: Russia
- Region: Vologda Oblast
- District: Verkhovazhsky District
- Time zone: UTC+3:00

Velikodvorskaya (Russian: Великодворская) is a rural locality (a village) in Chushevitskoye Rural Settlement, Verkhovazhsky District, Vologda Oblast, Russia. The population was 91 as of 2002. There are 2 streets.

== Geography ==
Velikodvorskaya is located 40 km south of Verkhovazhye (the district's administrative centre) by road. Terentyevskaya is the nearest rural locality.
