= Srednyaya, Verkhovazhsky District, Vologda Oblast =

Srednyaya Средняя
- Village
- Location within Vologda Oblast Location within Russia
- Coordinates: 60°40′N 41°32′E
- Country: Russia
- Region: Vologda Oblast
- District: Verkhovazhsky District
- Time zone: UTC+3:00

Srednyaya (Russian: Средняя) is a rural locality (a village) in Verkhovskoye Rural Settlement, Verkhovazhsky District, Vologda Oblast, Russia. The population was 60 as of 2002.

== Geography ==
Srednyaya is located 41 km southwest of Verkhovazhye (the district's administrative centre) by road. Sludnaya is the nearest rural locality.
