= Vladykina Gora =

Vladykina Gora Владыкина Гора
- Village
- Location within Vologda Oblast Location within Russia
- Coordinates: 60°30′N 41°53′E
- Country: Russia
- Region: Vologda Oblast
- District: Verkhovazhsky District
- Time zone: UTC+3:00

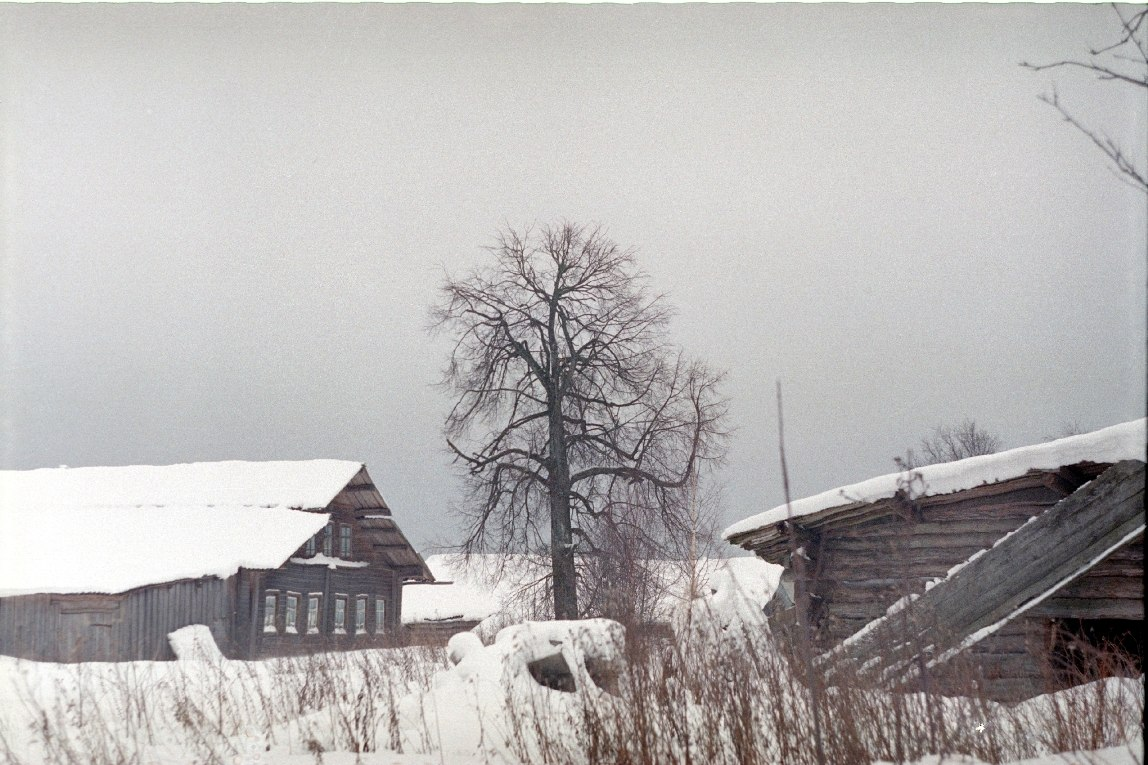
Vladykina Gora, Verkhovazhsky District

Vladykina Gora (Russian: Владыкина Гора) is a rural locality (a village) in Chushevitskoye Rural Settlement, Verkhovazhsky District, Vologda Oblast, Russia. The population was 100 as of 2002.

== Geography ==
Vladykina Gora is located 51 km southwest of Verkhovazhye (the district's administrative centre) by road. Spirino is the nearest rural locality.
