= Ryapolovskaya =

Ryapolovskaya Ряполовская
- Village
- Location within Vologda Oblast Location within Russia
- Coordinates: 60°35′N 42°39′E
- Country: Russia
- Region: Vologda Oblast
- District: Verkhovazhsky District
- Time zone: UTC+3:00

Ryapolovskaya (Russian: Ряполовская) is a rural locality (a village) in Sibirskoye Rural Settlement, Verkhovazhsky District, Vologda Oblast, Russia. The population was 5 as of 2002.

== Geography ==
Ryapolovskaya is located 46 km southeast of Verkhovazhye (the district's administrative centre) by road. Biryuchevskaya is the nearest rural locality.
