= Grikhnevskaya =

Grikhnevskaya Грихневская
- Village
- Location within Vologda Oblast Location within Russia
- Coordinates: 60°39′N 42°35′E
- Country: Russia
- Region: Vologda Oblast
- District: Verkhovazhsky District
- Time zone: UTC+3:00

Grikhnevskaya (Russian: Грихневская) is a rural locality (a village) in Nizhnekuloyskoye Rural Settlement, Verkhovazhsky District, Vologda Oblast, Russia. The population was 4 as of 2002.

== Geography ==
Grikhnevskaya is located 36 km southeast of Verkhovazhye (the district's administrative centre) by road. Ignatovskaya is the nearest rural locality.
