= Akinkhovskaya =

Akinkhovskaya Акиньховская
- Village
- Location within Vologda Oblast Location within Russia
- Coordinates: 60°21′N 41°51′E
- Country: Russia
- Region: Vologda Oblast
- District: Verkhovazhsky District

Population
  - Total: 8
- Time zone: UTC+3:00

Akinkhovskaya (Russian: Акиньховская) is a rural locality (a village) in Shelotskoye Rural Settlement, Verkhovazhsky District, Vologda Oblast, Russia. The population was 8 as of 2002.

== Geography ==
Akinkhovskaya is located 71 km southwest of Verkhovazhye (the district's administrative centre) by road. Stolbovo is the nearest rural locality.
