= Urusovskaya =

Urusovskaya Урусовская
- Village
- Location within Vologda Oblast Location within Russia
- Coordinates: 60°42′N 42°35′E
- Country: Russia
- Region: Vologda Oblast
- District: Verkhovazhsky District
- Time zone: UTC+3:00

Urusovskaya (Russian: Урусовская) is a rural locality (a village) and the administrative center of Nizhnekuloyskoye Rural Settlement, Verkhovazhsky District, Vologda Oblast, Russia. The population was 448 as of 2002. There are 17 streets.

== Geography ==
Urusovskaya is located 38 km southeast of Verkhovazhye (the district's administrative centre) by road. Dyakonovskaya is the nearest rural locality.
