= Terentyevskaya =

Terentyevskaya Терентьевская
- Village
- Location within Vologda Oblast Location within Russia
- Coordinates: 60°25′N 42°10′E
- Country: Russia
- Region: Vologda Oblast
- District: Verkhovazhsky District
- Time zone: UTC+3:00

Terentyevskaya (Russian: Терентьевская) is a rural locality (a village) in Chushevitskoye Rural Settlement, Verkhovazhsky District, Vologda Oblast, Russia. The population was 44 as of 2002.

== Geography ==
Terentyevskaya is located 41 km south of Verkhovazhye (the district's administrative centre) by road. Velikodvorskaya is the nearest rural locality.
