= Priluk, Verkhovazhsky District, Vologda Oblast =

Priluk Прилук
- Village
- Location within Vologda Oblast Location within Russia
- Coordinates: 60°37′N 41°49′E
- Country: Russia
- Region: Vologda Oblast
- District: Verkhovazhsky District
- Time zone: UTC+3:00

Priluk (Russian: Прилук) is a rural locality (a village) in Verkhovskoye Rural Settlement, Verkhovazhsky District, Vologda Oblast, Russia. The population was 9 as of 2002.

== Geography ==
Priluk is located 30 km southwest of Verkhovazhye (the district's administrative centre) by road. Kudrinskaya is the nearest rural locality.
