= Voronikha =

Voronikha Ворониха
- Village
- Location within Vologda Oblast Location within Russia
- Coordinates: 60°38′N 42°40′E
- Country: Russia
- Region: Vologda Oblast
- District: Verkhovazhsky District
- Time zone: UTC+3:00

Voronikha (Russian: Ворониха) is a rural locality (a village) in Sibirskoye Rural Settlement, Verkhovazhsky District, Vologda Oblast, Russia. The population was 29 as of 2002.

== Geography ==
Voronikha is located 41 km southeast of Verkhovazhye (the district's administrative centre) by road. Ostashevskaya is the nearest rural locality.
