= Payus =

Payus Паюс
- Village
- Location within Vologda Oblast Location within Russia
- Coordinates: 60°30′N 41°45′E
- Country: Russia
- Region: Vologda Oblast
- District: Verkhovazhsky District
- Time zone: UTC+3:00

Payus (Russian: Паюс) is a rural locality (a village) in Chushevitskoye Rural Settlement, Verkhovazhsky District, Vologda Oblast, Russia. The population was 310 as of 2002. There are five streets.

== Geography ==
Payus is located 41 km southwest of Verkhovazhye (the district's administrative centre) by road. Shchekino is the nearest rural locality.
