= Spitsynskaya =

Spitsynskaya Спицынская
- Village
- Location within Vologda Oblast Location within Russia
- Coordinates: 60°42′N 42°17′E
- Country: Russia
- Region: Vologda Oblast
- District: Verkhovazhsky District
- Time zone: UTC+3:00

Spitsynskaya (Russian: Спицынская) is a rural locality (a village) in Nizhne-Vazhskoye Rural Settlement, Verkhovazhsky District, Vologda Oblast, Russia. The population was 7 as of 2002.

== Geography ==
Spitsynskaya is located 19 km southeast of Verkhovazhye (the district's administrative centre) by road. Borisovskaya is the nearest rural locality.
