= Rostovo =

Rostovo Ростово
- Village
- Location within Vologda Oblast Location within Russia
- Coordinates: 60°28′N 41°38′E
- Country: Russia
- Region: Vologda Oblast
- District: Verkhovazhsky District
- Time zone: UTC+3:00

Rostovo (Russian: Ростово) is a rural locality (a village) in Chushevitskoye Rural Settlement, Verkhovazhsky District, Vologda Oblast, Russia. The population was 34 as of 2002.

== Geography ==
Rostovo is located 46 km southwest of Verkhovazhye (the district's administrative centre) by road. Krasulino is the nearest rural locality.
