= Motovilovo =

Motovilovo Мотовилово
- Village
- Location within Vologda Oblast Location within Russia
- Coordinates: 60°38′N 42°06′E
- Country: Russia
- Region: Vologda Oblast
- District: Verkhovazhsky District
- Time zone: UTC+3:00

Motovilovo (Russian: Мотовилово) is a rural locality (a village) in Nizhne-Vazhskoye Rural Settlement, Verkhovazhsky District, Vologda Oblast, Russia. The population was 6 as of 2002.

== Geography ==
Motovilovo is located 12 km southeast of Verkhovazhye (the district's administrative centre) by road. Stikhovskaya is the nearest rural locality.
