= Studentsevo =

Studentsevo Студенцово
- Village
- Location within Vologda Oblast Location within Russia
- Coordinates: 60°30′N 42°37′E
- Country: Russia
- Region: Vologda Oblast
- District: Verkhovazhsky District
- Time zone: UTC+3:00

Studentsevo (Russian: Студенцово) is a rural locality (a village) in Sibirskoye Rural Settlement, Verkhovazhsky District, Vologda Oblast, Russia. The population was 14 as of 2002.

== Geography ==
Studentsevo is located 48 km southeast of Verkhovazhye (the district's administrative centre) by road. Rogna is the nearest rural locality.
