= Plyoso, Verkhovazhsky District, Vologda Oblast =

Plyoso Плёсо
- Village
- Location within Vologda Oblast Location within Russia
- Coordinates: 60°24′N 41°42′E
- Country: Russia
- Region: Vologda Oblast
- District: Verkhovazhsky District
- Time zone: UTC+3:00

Plyoso (Russian: Плёсо) is a rural locality (a village) in Lipetskoye Rural Settlement, Verkhovazhsky District, Vologda Oblast, Russia. The population was 28 as of 2002. There are 3 streets.

== Geography ==
Plyoso is located 53 km southwest of Verkhovazhye (the district's administrative centre) by road. Dubrova is the nearest rural locality.
