= Matveyevskaya, Chushevitskoye Rural Settlement, Verkhovazhsky District, Vologda Oblast =

Matveyevskaya Матвеевская
- Village
- Location within Vologda Oblast Location within Russia
- Coordinates: 60°25′N 42°10′E
- Country: Russia
- Region: Vologda Oblast
- District: Verkhovazhsky District
- Time zone: UTC+3:00

Matveyevskaya (Russian: Матвеевская) is a rural locality (a village) in Chushevitskoye Rural Settlement, Verkhovazhsky District, Vologda Oblast, Russia. The population was 7 as of 2002.

== Geography ==
The distance to Verkhovazhye is 41.5 km, to Chushevitsy is 25 km. Velikodvorskaya, Terentyevskaya, Zhavoronkovo, Kochevarsky Pogost are the nearest rural localities.
