= Nivskaya =

Nivskaya Нивская
- Village
- Location within Vologda Oblast Location within Russia
- Coordinates: 60°46′N 42°43′E
- Country: Russia
- Region: Vologda Oblast
- District: Verkhovazhsky District
- Time zone: UTC+3:00

Nivskaya (Russian: Нивская) is a rural locality (a village) in Kolengskoye Rural Settlement, Verkhovazhsky District, Vologda Oblast, Russia. The population was 30 as of 2002.

== Geography ==
Nivskaya is located 52 km east of Verkhovazhye (the district's administrative centre) by road. Noginskaya is the nearest rural locality.
