= Stolbovo, Vologda Oblast =

Stolbovo Столбово
- Village
- Location within Vologda Oblast Location within Russia
- Coordinates: 60°21′N 41°51′E
- Country: Russia
- Region: Vologda Oblast
- District: Verkhovazhsky District
- Time zone: UTC+3:00

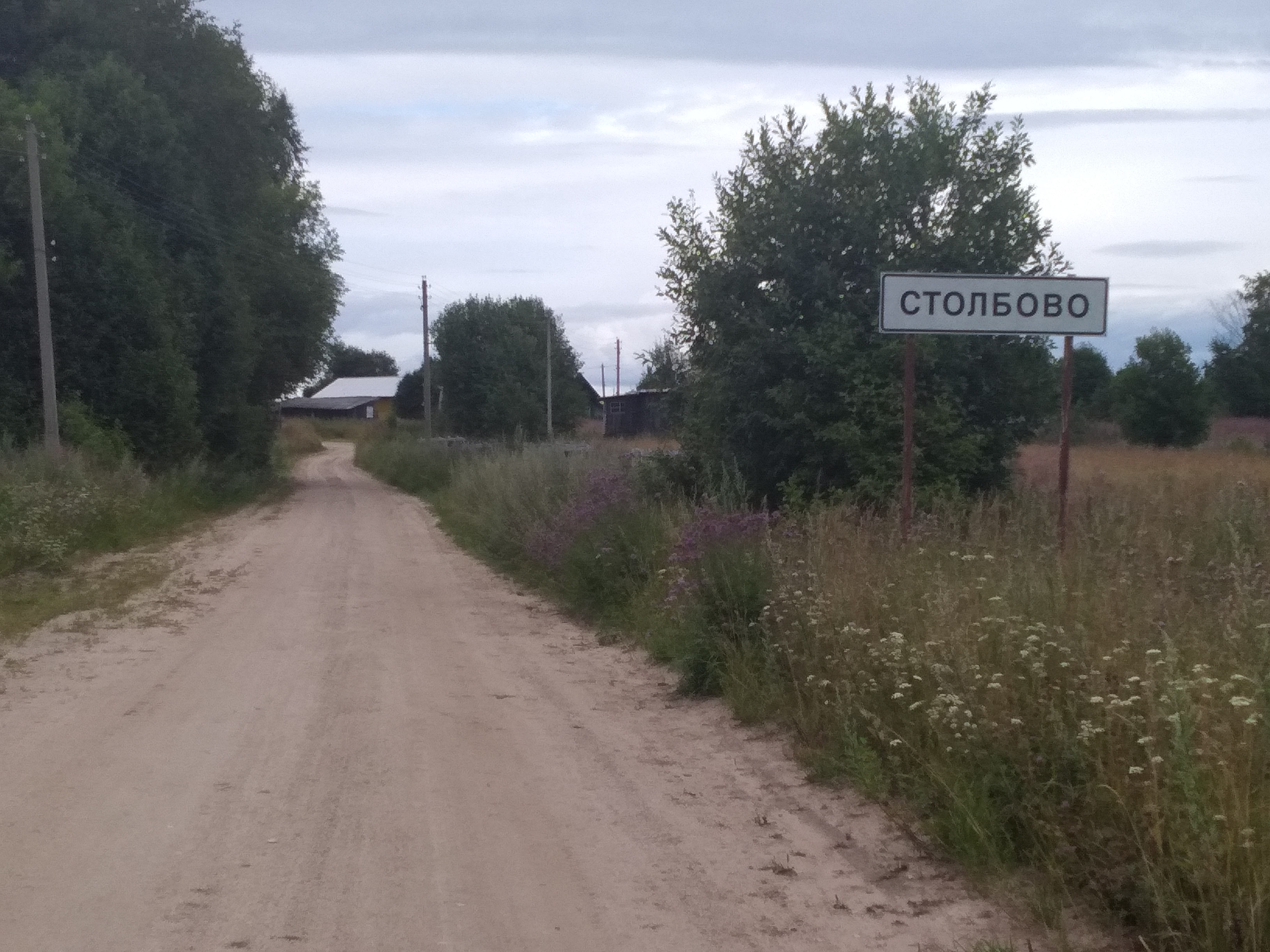
Stolbovo village, Verkhovazhsky District, Vologda Oblast

Stolbovo (Russian: Столбово) is a rural locality (a village) in Shelotskoye Rural Settlement, Verkhovazhsky District, Vologda Oblast, Russia. The population was 14 as of 2002.

== Geography ==
Stolbovo is located 70 km southwest of Verkhovazhye (the district's administrative centre) by road. Akinkhovskaya is the nearest rural locality.
