= Somitsyno =

Somitsyno Сомицыно
- Village
- Location within Vologda Oblast Location within Russia
- Coordinates: 60°45′N 42°04′E
- Country: Russia
- Region: Vologda Oblast
- District: Verkhovazhsky District

Population
  - Total: 28
- Time zone: UTC+3:00

Somitsyno (Russian: Сомицыно) is a rural locality (a village) in Nizhne-Vazhskoye Rural Settlement, Verkhovazhsky District, Vologda Oblast, Russia. The population was 28 as of 2002. There are 3 streets.

== Geography ==
Somitsyno is located 3 km northeast of Verkhovazhye (the district's administrative centre) by road. Cheryomushki is the nearest rural locality.
