= Bushnitskaya =

Bushnitskaya Бушницкая
- Village
- Location within Vologda Oblast Location within Russia
- Coordinates: 60°43′N 41°35′E
- Country: Russia
- Region: Vologda Oblast
- District: Verkhovazhsky District
- Time zone: UTC+3:00

Bushnitskaya (Russian: Бушницкая) is a rural locality (a village) in Morozovskoye Rural Settlement, Verkhovazhsky District, Vologda Oblast, Russia. The population was 3 as of 2002.

== Geography ==
Bushnitskaya is located 35 km west of Verkhovazhye (the district's administrative centre) by road. Ostrovskaya is the nearest rural locality.
