= Kudrinskaya =

Kudrinskaya Кудринская
- Village
- Location within Vologda Oblast Location within Russia
- Coordinates: 60°36′N 41°49′E
- Country: Russia
- Region: Vologda Oblast
- District: Verkhovazhsky District
- Time zone: UTC+3:00

Kudrinskaya (Russian: Кудринская) is a rural locality (a village) in Verkhovskoye Rural Settlement, Verkhovazhsky District, Vologda Oblast, Russia. The population was 48 as of 2002.

== Geography ==
Kudrinskaya is located 31 km southwest of Verkhovazhye (the district's administrative centre) by road. Priluk is the nearest rural locality.
