= Kukolovskaya =

Kukolovskaya Куколовская
- Village
- Location within Vologda Oblast Location within Russia
- Coordinates: 60°40′N 42°03′E
- Country: Russia
- Region: Vologda Oblast
- District: Verkhovazhsky District
- Time zone: UTC+3:00

Kukolovskaya (Russian: Куколовская) is a rural locality (a village) in Nizhne-Vazhskoye Rural Settlement, Verkhovazhsky District, Vologda Oblast, Russia. The population was 243 as of 2002. There are 3 streets.

== Geography ==
Kukolovskaya is located 9 km south of Verkhovazhye (the district's administrative centre) by road. Korovino is the nearest rural locality.
