= Anisimovskaya =

Anisimovskaya Анисимовская
- Village
- Location within Vologda Oblast Location within Russia
- Coordinates: 60°37′N 42°42′E
- Country: Russia
- Region: Vologda Oblast
- District: Verkhovazhsky District

Population
  - Total: 7
- Time zone: UTC+3:00

Anisimovskaya (Russian: Анисимовская) is a rural locality (a village) in Sibirskoye Rural Settlement, Verkhovazhsky District, Vologda Oblast, Russia. The population was 7 as of 2002.

== Geography ==
The distance to Verkhovazhye is 43 km, to Yeliseyevskaya is 12 km. Aksenovskaya is the nearest rural locality.
