= Mokiyevskaya =

Mokiyevskaya Мокиевская
- Village
- Location within Vologda Oblast Location within Russia
- Coordinates: 60°36′N 41°49′E
- Country: Russia
- Region: Vologda Oblast
- District: Verkhovazhsky District
- Time zone: UTC+3:00

Mokiyevskaya (Russian: Мокиевская) is a rural locality (a village) in Verkhovskoye Rural Settlement, Verkhovazhsky District, Vologda Oblast, Russia. The population was 26 as of 2002.

== Geography ==
The distance to Verkhovazhye is 28 km, to Smetanino is 4 km. Osnovinskaya, Kudrinskaya, Priluk are the nearest rural localities.
