= Bosyginskaya =

Bosyginskaya Босыгинская
- Village
- Location within Vologda Oblast Location within Russia
- Coordinates: 60°43′N 42°34′E
- Country: Russia
- Region: Vologda Oblast
- District: Verkhovazhsky District
- Time zone: UTC+3:00

Bosyginskaya (Russian: Босыгинская) is a rural locality (a village) in Nizhnekuloyskoye Rural Settlement, Verkhovazhsky District, Vologda Oblast, Russia. The population was 26 as of 2002. There are 2 streets.

== Geography ==
Bosyginskaya is located 40 km east of Verkhovazhye (the district's administrative centre) by road. Orekhovskaya is the nearest rural locality.
