= Abakumovskaya =

Abakumovskaya Абакумовская
- Village
- Location within Vologda Oblast Location within Russia
- Coordinates: 60°36′N 42°05′E
- Country: Russia
- Region: Vologda Oblast
- District: Verkhovazhsky District

Population
  - Total: 20
- Time zone: UTC+3:00

Abakumovskaya (Russian: Абакумовская) is a rural locality (a village) in Nizhne-Vazhskoye Rural Settlement of Verkhovazhsky District, Vologda Oblast, Russia. The population was 20 as of 2002.

== Geography ==
Abakumovskaya is located 5 km northeast of Verkhovazhye (the district's administrative centre) by road. Ruchyevskaya is the nearest rural locality.
