= Kozevskaya =

Kozevskaya Козевская
- Village
- Location within Vologda Oblast Location within Russia
- Coordinates: 60°36′N 42°42′E
- Country: Russia
- Region: Vologda Oblast
- District: Verkhovazhsky District
- Time zone: UTC+3:00

Kozevskaya (Russian: Козевская) is a rural locality (a village) in Sibirskoye Rural Settlement, Verkhovazhsky District, Vologda Oblast, Russia. The population was 3 as of 2002.

== Geography ==
Kozevskaya is located 46 km southeast of Verkhovazhye (the district's administrative centre) by road. Savinskaya is the nearest rural locality.
