= Kostyuninskaya =

Kostyuninskaya Костюнинская
- Village
- Location within Vologda Oblast Location within Russia
- Coordinates: 60°26′N 41°43′E
- Country: Russia
- Region: Vologda Oblast
- District: Verkhovazhsky District
- Time zone: UTC+3:00

Kostyuninskaya (Russian: Костюнинская) is a rural locality (a village) in Lipetskoye Rural Settlement, Verkhovazhsky District, Vologda Oblast, Russia. The population was 4 as of 2002.

== Geography ==
The distance to Verkhovazhye is 70.7 km, to Leushinskaya is 3 km. Ivanovskaya, Nikulinskaya, Leushinskaya are the nearest rural localities.
