= Bumazhnaya Fabrika, Vologda Oblast =

Bumazhnaya Fabrika Бумажная Фабрика
- Village
- Location within Vologda Oblast Location within Russia
- Coordinates: 60°47′N 42°08′E
- Country: Russia
- Region: Vologda Oblast
- District: Verkhovazhsky District
- Time zone: UTC+3:00

Bumazhnaya Fabrika (Russian: Бумажная Фабрика) is a rural locality (a village) in Nizhne-Vazhskoye Rural Settlement, Verkhovazhsky District, Vologda Oblast, Russia. The population was 8 as of 2002.

== Geography ==
Bumazhnaya Fabrika is located 13 km northeast of Verkhovazhye (the district's administrative centre) by road. Leonovskaya is the nearest rural locality.
