= Boyarskaya, Verkhovazhsky District, Vologda Oblast =

Boyarskaya Боярская
- Village
- Location within Vologda Oblast Location within Russia
- Coordinates: 60°34′N 42°37′E
- Country: Russia
- Region: Vologda Oblast
- District: Verkhovazhsky District
- Time zone: UTC+3:00

Boyarskaya (Russian: Боярская) is a rural locality (a village) in Sibirskoye Rural Settlement, Verkhovazhsky District, Vologda Oblast, Russia. The population was 91 as of 2002.

== Geography ==
Boyarskaya is located 50 km southeast of Verkhovazhye (the district's administrative centre) by road. Yeliseyevskaya is the nearest rural locality.
