= Savkovo, Vologda Oblast =

Savkovo Савково
- Village
- Location within Vologda Oblast Location within Russia
- Coordinates: 60°30′N 41°41′E
- Country: Russia
- Region: Vologda Oblast
- District: Verkhovazhsky District
- Time zone: UTC+3:00

Savkovo (Russian: Савково) is a rural locality (a village) in Chushevitskoye Rural Settlement, Verkhovazhsky District, Vologda Oblast, Russia. The population was 1 as of 2002.

== Geography ==
Savkovo is located 42 km southwest of Verkhovazhye (the district's administrative centre) by road. Shchekino is the nearest rural locality.
