= Spirino, Verkhovazhsky District, Vologda Oblast =

Spirino Спирино
- Village
- Location within Vologda Oblast Location within Russia
- Coordinates: 60°30′N 41°52′E
- Country: Russia
- Region: Vologda Oblast
- District: Verkhovazhsky District
- Time zone: UTC+3:00

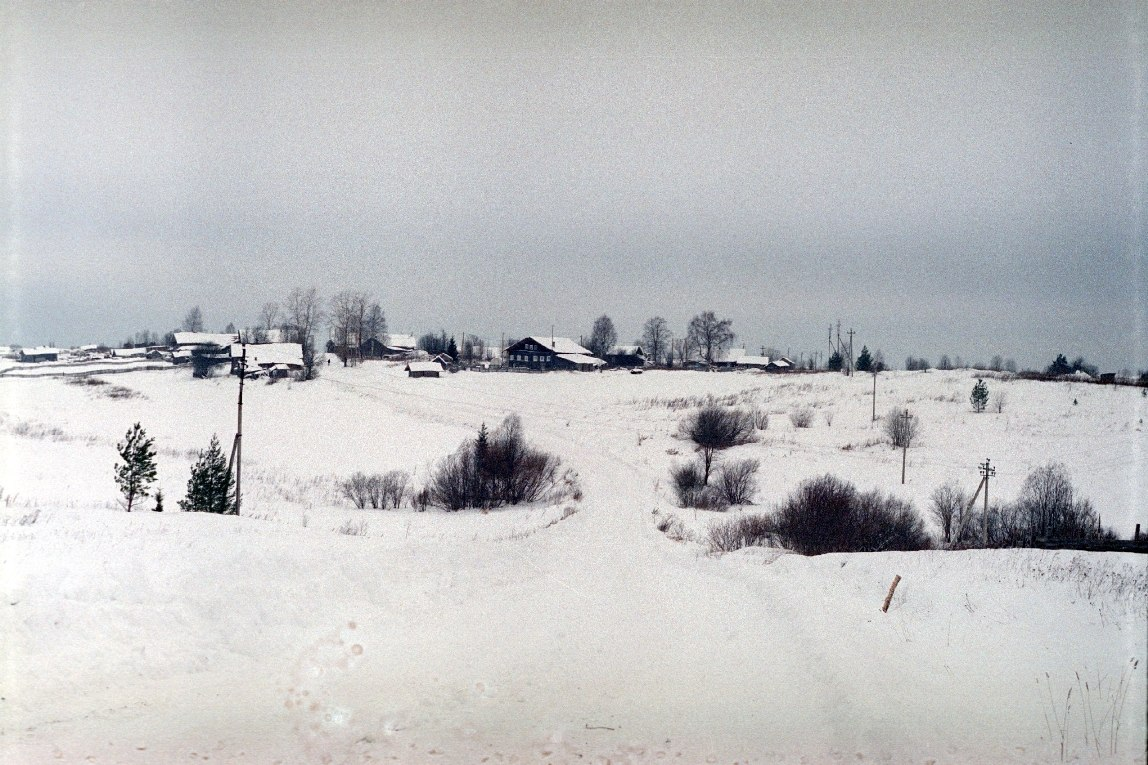
Spirino, Verkhovazhsky district, covered with snow

Spirino (Russian: Спирино) is a rural locality (a village) in Chushevitskaoye Rural Settlement, Verkhovazhsky District, Vologda Oblast, Russia. The population was 29 as of 2002.

== Geography ==
Spirino is located 50 km southwest of Verkhovazhye (the district's administrative centre) by road. Vladykina Gora is the nearest rural locality.
