= Makartsevo =

Makartsevo Макарцево
- Settlement
- Location within Vologda Oblast Location within Russia
- Coordinates: 60°34′N 41°54′E
- Country: Russia
- Region: Vologda Oblast
- District: Verkhovazhsky District
- Time zone: UTC+3:00

Makartsevo (Russian: Макарцево) is a rural locality (a settlement) in Verkhovskoye Rural Settlement, Verkhovazhsky District, Vologda Oblast, Russia. The population was 307 as of 2002. There are 11 streets.

== Geography ==
Makartsevo is located 38 km southwest of Verkhovazhye (the district's administrative centre) by road. Osnovinskaya is the nearest rural locality.
