= Kalichye =

Kalichye Каличье
- Village
- Location within Vologda Oblast Location within Russia
- Coordinates: 60°39′N 42°05′E
- Country: Russia
- Region: Vologda Oblast
- District: Verkhovazhsky District
- Time zone: UTC+3:00

Kalichye (Russian: Каличье) is a rural locality (a village) in Nizhne-Vazhskoye Rural Settlement, Verkhovazhsky District, Vologda Oblast, Russia. The population was 13 as of 2002.

== Geography ==
Kalichye is located 10 km south of Verkhovazhye (the district's administrative centre) by road. Koptyayevskaya is the nearest rural locality.
