= Skulinskaya =

Skulinskaya Скулинская
- Village
- Location within Vologda Oblast Location within Russia
- Coordinates: 60°35′N 41°43′E
- Country: Russia
- Region: Vologda Oblast
- District: Verkhovazhsky District
- Time zone: UTC+3:00

Skulinskaya (Russian: Скулинская) is a rural locality (a village) in Verkhovskoye Rural Settlement, Verkhovazhsky District, Vologda Oblast, Russia. The population was 2 as of 2002.

== Geography ==
Skulinskaya is located 30 km southwest of Verkhovazhye (the district's administrative centre) by road. Moiseyevskaya is the nearest rural locality.
