= Pezhma, Vologda Oblast =

Pezhma Пежма
- Settlement
- Location within Vologda Oblast Location within Russia
- Coordinates: 60°51′N 41°43′E
- Country: Russia
- Region: Vologda Oblast
- District: Verkhovazhsky District
- Time zone: UTC+3:00

Pezhma (Russian: Пежма) is a rural locality (a settlement) in Morozovskoye Rural Settlement, Verkhovazhsky District, Vologda Oblast, Russia. The population was 383 as of 2002. There are 5 streets.

== Geography ==
Pezhma is located 34 km northwest of Verkhovazhye (the district's administrative centre) by road. Borovaya Pustosh is the nearest rural locality.
