= Mokiyevskaya, Morozovskoye Rural Settlement, Verkhovazhsky District, Vologda Oblast =

Mokiyevskaya Мокиевская
- Village
- Location within Vologda Oblast Location within Russia
- Coordinates: 60°46′N 41°42′E
- Country: Russia
- Region: Vologda Oblast
- District: Verkhovazhsky District
- Time zone: UTC+3:00

Mokiyevskaya (Russian: Мокиевская) is a rural locality (a village) in Morozovskoye Rural Settlement, Verkhovazhsky District, Vologda Oblast, Russia. The population was 61 as of 2002.

== Geography ==
The distance to Verkhovazhye is 23 km, to Morozovo is 1.7 km. Olotinskaya, Mikhaylovskaya, Silinskaya-1 are the nearest rural localities.
