= Vakhrushevo, Verkhovazhsky District, Vologda Oblast =

Vakhrushevo Вахрушево
- Village
- Location within Vologda Oblast Location within Russia
- Coordinates: 60°48′N 42°06′E
- Country: Russia
- Region: Vologda Oblast
- District: Verkhovazhsky District
- Time zone: UTC+3:00

Vakhrushevo (Russian: Вахрушево) is a rural locality (a village) in Nizhne-Vazhskoye Rural Settlement, Verkhovazhsky District, Vologda Oblast, Russia. The population was 31 in 2002.

== Geography ==
Vakhrushevo is located 8 kilometres (5.0 mi) northeast of Verkhovazhye (the district's administrative centre) by road. Ivanovskaya is the nearest rural locality.
