= Feklukha =

Feklukha Феклуха
- Village
- Location within Vologda Oblast Location within Russia
- Coordinates: 60°37′N 42°55′E
- Country: Russia
- Region: Vologda Oblast
- District: Verkhovazhsky District
- Time zone: UTC+3:00

Feklukha (Russian: Феклуха) is a rural locality (a village) in Kolengskoye Rural Settlement, Verkhovazhsky District, Vologda Oblast, Russia. The population was 329 as of 2002. There are five streets.

== Geography ==
Feklukha is located 61 km southeast of Verkhovazhye (the district's administrative centre) by road. Kharitonovskaya is the nearest rural locality.
