= Sekushinskaya =

Sekushinskaya Секушинская
- Village
- Location within Vologda Oblast Location within Russia
- Coordinates: 60°40′N 42°39′E
- Country: Russia
- Region: Vologda Oblast
- District: Verkhovazhsky District
- Time zone: UTC+3:00

Sekushinskaya (Russian: Секушинская) is a rural locality (a village) in Sibirskoye Rural Settlement, Verkhovazhsky District, Vologda Oblast, Russia. The population was 2 as of 2002.

== Geography ==
Sekushinskaya is located 51 km southwest of Verkhovazhye (the district's administrative centre) by road. Leushinskaya is the nearest rural locality.
