= Papinskaya =

Papinskaya Папинская
- Village
- Location within Vologda Oblast Location within Russia
- Coordinates: 60°30′N 42°13′E
- Country: Russia
- Region: Vologda Oblast
- District: Verkhovazhsky District
- Time zone: UTC+3:00

Papinskaya (Russian: Папинская) is a rural locality (a village) in Nizhne-Vazhskoye Rural Settlement, Verkhovazhsky District, Vologda Oblast, Russia. The population was 15 as of 2002.

== Geography ==
Papinskaya is located 30 km southeast of Verkhovazhye (the district's administrative centre) by road. Trutnevskaya is the nearest rural locality.
