= Morozovo, Verkhovazhsky District, Vologda Oblast =

Morozovo Морозово
- Selo
- Location within Vologda Oblast Location within Russia
- Coordinates: 60°47′N 41°40′E
- Country: Russia
- Region: Vologda Oblast
- District: Verkhovazhsky District
- Time zone: UTC+3:00

Morozovo (Russian: Морозово) is a rural locality (a selo) and the administrative center of Morozovskoye Rural Settlement, Verkhovazhsky District, Vologda Oblast, Russia. The population was 158 as of 2002. There are 6 streets.

== Geography ==
Morozovo is located 26 km northwest of Verkhovazhye (the district's administrative centre) by road. Silinskaya-1 is the nearest rural locality.
