= Rogna, Vologda Oblast =

Rogna Рогна
- Village
- Location within Vologda Oblast Location within Russia
- Coordinates: 60°29′N 42°34′E
- Country: Russia
- Region: Vologda Oblast
- District: Verkhovazhsky District
- Time zone: UTC+3:00

Rogna (Russian: Рогна) is a rural locality (a village) in Sibirskoye Rural Settlement, Verkhovazhsky District, Vologda Oblast, Russia. The population was 410 as of 2002. There are 8 streets.

== Geography ==
Rogna is located 49 km southeast of Verkhovazhye (the district's administrative centre) by road. Studentsovo is the nearest rural locality.
