= Kharitonovskaya, Sibirskoye Rural Settlement, Verkhovazhsky District, Vologda Oblast =

Kharitonovskaya Харитоновская
- Village
- Location within Vologda Oblast Location within Russia
- Coordinates: 60°38′N 42°41′E
- Country: Russia
- Region: Vologda Oblast
- District: Verkhovazhsky District
- Time zone: UTC+3:00

Kharitonovskaya (Russian: Харитоновская) is a rural locality (a village) in Sibirskoye Rural Settlement, Verkhovazhsky District, Vologda Oblast, Russia. The population was 21 as of 2002.

== Geography ==
The distance to Verkhovazhye is 57 km, to Yeliseyevskya is 9 km. Sakulinskaya, Ostashevskaya, Safronovskaya, Voronikha are the nearest rural localities.
