= Moiseyevskaya =

Moiseyevskaya Моисеевская
- Village
- Location within Vologda Oblast Location within Russia
- Coordinates: 60°34′N 41°42′E
- Country: Russia
- Region: Vologda Oblast
- District: Verkhovazhsky District
- Time zone: UTC+3:00

Moiseyevskaya (Russian: Моисеевская) is a rural locality (a village) in Verkhovskoye Rural Settlement, Verkhovazhsky District, Vologda Oblast, Russia. The population was 3 as of 2002.

== Geography ==
The distance to Verkhovazhye is 33.5 km, to Smetanino is 1.5 km. Skulinskaya, Kudrino, Novaya Derevnya are the nearest rural localities.
