= Vysotinskaya =

Vysotinskaya Высотинская
- Village
- Location within Vologda Oblast Location within Russia
- Coordinates: 60°40′N 42°36′E
- Country: Russia
- Region: Vologda Oblast
- District: Verkhovazhsky District
- Time zone: UTC+3:00

Vysotinskaya (Russian: Высотинская) is a rural locality (a village) in Nizhnekuloyskoye Rural Settlement, Verkhovazhsky District, Vologda Oblast, Russia. The population was 6 as of 2002.

== Geography ==
Vysotinskaya is located 40 km southeast of Verkhovazhye (the district's administrative centre) by road. Brevnovskaya is the nearest rural locality.
