= Afoninskaya (Nizhne-Vazhskoye Rural Settlement) =

Afoninskaya Афонинская
- Village
- Location within Vologda Oblast Location within Russia
- Coordinates: 60°43′N 41°57′E
- Country: Russia
- Region: Vologda Oblast
- District: Verkhovazhsky District

Population
  - Total: 12
- Time zone: UTC+3:00

Afoninskaya (Russian: Афонинская) is a rural locality (a village) in Nizhne-Vazhskoye Rural Settlement, Verkhovazhsky District, Vologda Oblast, Russia. The population was 12 as of 2002.

== Geography ==
The distance to Verkhovazhye is 5.3 km, to Naumikha is 7.2 km. Dudorovo is the nearest rural locality.
