= Moiseyevskaya, Nizhne-Vazhskoye Rural Settlement, Verkhovazhsky District, Vologda Oblast =

Moiseyevskaya Моисеевская
- Village
- Location within Vologda Oblast Location within Russia
- Coordinates: 60°43′N 41°58′E
- Country: Russia
- Region: Vologda Oblast
- District: Verkhovazhsky District
- Time zone: UTC+3:00

Moiseyevskaya (Russian: Моисеевская) is a rural locality (a village) in Nizhne-Vazhskoye Rural Settlement, Verkhovazhsky District, Vologda Oblast, Russia. The population was 15 as of 2002.

== Geography ==
The distance to Verkhovazhye is 4.7 km, to Naumikha is 6.6 km. Rogachikha, Pavlogorskaya, Sergeyevskaya, Afoninskaya, Bolshoye Yefimovo, Pyatino are the nearest rural localities.
