= Verkhneye Makarovo =

Verkhneye Makarovo Верхнее Макарово
- Village
- Location within Vologda Oblast Location within Russia
- Coordinates: 60°45′N 42°06′E
- Country: Russia
- Region: Vologda Oblast
- District: Verkhovazhsky District
- Time zone: UTC+3:00

Verkhneye Makarovo (Russian: Верхнее Макарово) is a rural locality (a village) in Verkhovazhskoye Rural Settlement, Verkhovazhsky District, Vologda Oblast, Russia. The population was 15 as of 2002.

== Geography ==
Verkhneye Makarovo is located 6 km northeast of Verkhovazhye (the district's administrative centre) by road. Filinskaya is the nearest rural locality.
