= Sergeyevskaya, Verkhovazhsky District, Vologda Oblast =

Sergeyevskaya Сергеевская
- Village
- Location within Vologda Oblast Location within Russia
- Coordinates: 60°43′N 41°58′E
- Country: Russia
- Region: Vologda Oblast
- District: Verkhovazhsky District
- Time zone: UTC+3:00

Sergeyevskaya (Russian: Сергеевская) is a rural locality (a village) in Nizhne-Vazhskoye Rural Settlement, Verkhovazhsky District, Vologda Oblast, Russia. The population was 2 as of 2002.

== Geography ==
Sergeyevskaya is located 5 km southwest of Verkhovazhye (the district's administrative centre) by road. Afoninskaya is the nearest rural locality.
