= Dor, Verkhovazhsky District, Vologda Oblast =

Dor Дор
- Village
- Location within Vologda Oblast Location within Russia
- Coordinates: 60°39′N 41°32′E
- Country: Russia
- Region: Vologda Oblast
- District: Verkhovazhsky District
- Time zone: UTC+3:00

Dor (Russian: Дор) is a rural locality (a village) in Verkhovskoye Rural Settlement, Verkhovazhsky District, Vologda Oblast, Russia. The population was 69 as of 2002.

== Geography ==
Dor is located 40 km southwest of Verkhovazhye (the district's administrative centre) by road. Botyzhnaya is the nearest rural locality.
