= Pestrukha =

Pestrukha Пеструха
- Village
- Location within Vologda Oblast Location within Russia
- Coordinates: 60°30′09″N 41°37′58″E
- Country: Russia
- Region: Vologda Oblast
- District: Verkhovazhsky District
- Time zone: UTC+3:00

Pestrukha (Russian: Пеструха) is a rural locality (a village) in Chushevitskoye Rural Settlement, Verkhovazhsky District, Vologda Oblast, Russia. The population was 4 as of 2002.

== Geography ==
Pestrukha is located 49 km southwest of Verkhovazhye (the district's administrative centre) by road. Krasulino is the nearest rural locality.
