= Filinskaya =

Filinskaya Филинская
- Village
- Location within Vologda Oblast Location within Russia
- Coordinates: 60°45′N 42°05′E
- Country: Russia
- Region: Vologda Oblast
- District: Verkhovazhsky District
- Time zone: UTC+3:00

Filinskaya (Russian: Филинская) is a rural locality (a village) in Verkhovazhskoye Rural Settlement, Verkhovazhsky District, Vologda Oblast, Russia. The population was 3 as of 2002.

== Geography ==
The distance to Verkhovazhye is 5 km. Verkhneye Makarovo, Abakumovskaya, Ruchyevskaya, Yelezovskaya, Tyoply Ruchey, Yeksinskoye, Somitsyno are the nearest rural localities.
