= Rogachikha =

Rogachikha Рогачиха
- Village
- Location within Vologda Oblast Location within Russia
- Coordinates: 60°42′N 41°59′E
- Country: Russia
- Region: Vologda Oblast
- District: Verkhovazhsky District
- Time zone: UTC+3:00

Rogachikha (Russian: Рогачиха) is a rural locality (a village) in Verkhovazhskoye Rural Settlement, Verkhovazhsky District, Vologda Oblast, Russia. The population was 23 as of 2002. There are 2 streets.

== Geography ==
Rogachikha is located 6 km southwest of Verkhovazhye (the district's administrative centre) by road. Yuzhny is the nearest rural locality.
