= Leushinskaya =

Leushinskaya Леушинская
- Village
- Location within Vologda Oblast Location within Russia
- Coordinates: 60°25′N 41°41′E
- Country: Russia
- Region: Vologda Oblast
- District: Verkhovazhsky District
- Time zone: UTC+3:00

Leushinskaya (Russian: Леушинская) is a rural locality (a village) and the administrative center of Lipetskoye Rural Settlement, Verkhovazhsky District, Vologda Oblast, Russia. The population was 351 as of 2002. There are 12 streets.

== Geography ==
Leushinskaya is located 51 km southwest of Verkhovazhye (the district's administrative centre) by road. Gorka is the nearest rural locality.
