= Svetilnovo, Vologda Oblast =

Svetilnovo Светильново
- Village
- Location within Vologda Oblast Location within Russia
- Coordinates: 60°52′N 41°40′E
- Country: Russia
- Region: Vologda Oblast
- District: Verkhovazhsky District
- Time zone: UTC+3:00

Svetilnovo (Russian: Светильново) is a rural locality (a village) in Lipetskoye Rural Settlement, Verkhovazhsky District, Vologda Oblast, Russia. The population was 31 as of 2002.

== Geography ==
Svetilnovo is located 51 km southwest of Verkhovazhye (the district's administrative centre) by road. Gridino is the nearest rural locality.
