= Mashkovskaya =

Mashkovskaya Машковская
- Village
- Location within Vologda Oblast Location within Russia
- Coordinates: 60°48′N 41°40′E
- Country: Russia
- Region: Vologda Oblast
- District: Verkhovazhsky District
- Time zone: UTC+3:00

Mashkovskaya (Russian: Машковская) is a rural locality (a village) in Morozovskoye Rural Settlement, Verkhovazhsky District, Vologda Oblast, Russia. The population was 21 as of 2002.

== Geography ==
Mashkovskaya is located 28 km northwest of Verkhovazhye (the district's administrative centre) by road. Mininskaya is the nearest rural locality.
