= Ploskovo, Verkhovazhsky District, Vologda Oblast =

Ploskovo Плосково
- Village
- Location within Vologda Oblast Location within Russia
- Coordinates: 60°29′N 41°47′E
- Country: Russia
- Region: Vologda Oblast
- District: Verkhovazhsky District
- Time zone: UTC+3:00

Ploskovo (Russian: Плосково) is a rural locality (a village) in Chushevitskoye Rural Settlement, Verkhovazhsky District, Vologda Oblast, Russia. The population was 359 as of 2002. There are 10 streets.

== Geography ==
Ploskovo is located 45 km southwest of Verkhovazhye (the district's administrative centre) by road. Bereg is the nearest rural locality.
