= Koptyayevskaya =

Koptyayevskaya Коптяевская
- Village
- Location within Vologda Oblast Location within Russia
- Coordinates: 60°39′N 42°05′E
- Country: Russia
- Region: Vologda Oblast
- District: Verkhovazhsky District
- Time zone: UTC+3:00

Koptyayevskaya (Russian: Коптяевская) is a rural locality (a village) in Nizhne-Vazhskoye Rural Settlement, Verkhovazhsky District, Vologda Oblast, Russia. The population was 41 as of 2002.

== Geography ==
Koptyayevskaya is located 11 km southeast of Verkhovazhye (the district's administrative centre) by road. Kalichye is the nearest rural locality.
