= Zhavoronkovo, Verkhovazhsky District, Vologda Oblast =

Zhavoronkovo Жаворонково
- Village
- Location within Vologda Oblast Location within Russia
- Coordinates: 60°25′N 42°09′E
- Country: Russia
- Region: Vologda Oblast
- District: Verkhovazhsky District
- Time zone: UTC+3:00

Zhavoronkovo (Russian: Жаворонково) is a rural locality (a village) in Chushevitskoye Rural Settlement, Verkhovazhsky District, Vologda Oblast, Russia. The population was 9 as of 2002.

== Geography ==
Zhavoronkovo is located 42 km south of Verkhovazhye (the district's administrative centre) by road. Kochevarsky Pogost is the nearest rural locality.
