= Sboyevskaya =

Sboyevskaya Сбоевская
- Village
- Location within Vologda Oblast Location within Russia
- Coordinates: 60°47′N 41°41′E
- Country: Russia
- Region: Vologda Oblast
- District: Verkhovazhsky District
- Time zone: UTC+3:00

Sboyevskaya (Russian: Сбоевская) is a rural locality (a village) in Morozovskoye Rural Settlement, Verkhovazhsky District, Vologda Oblast, Russia. The population was 9 as of 2002.

== Geography ==
Sboyevskaya is located 27 km northwest of Verkhovazhye (the district's administrative centre) by road. Morozovo is the nearest rural locality.
