= Dudorovo =

Dudorovo Дудорово
- Village
- Location within Vologda Oblast Location within Russia
- Coordinates: 60°44′N 41°59′E
- Country: Russia
- Region: Vologda Oblast
- District: Verkhovazhsky District
- Time zone: UTC+3:00

Dudorovo (Russian: Дудорово) is a rural locality (a village) in Nizhne-Vazhskoye Rural Settlement, Verkhovazhsky District, Vologda Oblast, Russia. The population was 16 as of 2002.

== Geography ==
Dudorovo is located 4 km southwest of Verkhovazhye (the district's administrative centre) by road. Verkhovazhye is the nearest rural locality.
