= Zakharovsky =

Zakharovsky (masculine), Zakharovskaya (feminine), or Zakharovskoye (neuter) may refer to:

- Zakharovsky District, a district of Ryazan Oblast, Russia
- Zakharovsky (rural locality) (Zakharovskaya, Zakharovskoye), name of several rural localities in Russia
