= Dubrova, Chushevitskoye Rural Settlement, Verkhovazhsky District, Vologda Oblast =

Dubrova Дуброва
- Village
- Location within Vologda Oblast Location within Russia
- Coordinates: 60°31′N 41°53′E
- Country: Russia
- Region: Vologda Oblast
- District: Verkhovazhsky District
- Time zone: UTC+3:00

Dubrova (Russian: Дуброва) is a rural locality (a village) in Chushevitskoye Rural Settlement, Verkhovazhsky District, Vologda Oblast, Russia. The population was 11 as of 2002.

== Geography ==
The distance to Verkhovazhye is 53.8 km, to Chushevitsy is 10 km. Tolstukha, Vladykina Gora, Spirino, Kaychikha are the nearest rural localities.
