= Silinskaya-2 =

Silinskaya-2 Силинская-2
- Village
- Location within Vologda Oblast Location within Russia
- Coordinates: 60°44′N 41°36′E
- Country: Russia
- Region: Vologda Oblast
- District: Verkhovazhsky District
- Time zone: UTC+3:00

Silinskaya-2 (Russian: Силинская-2) is a rural locality (a village) in Morozovskoye Rural Settlement, Verkhovazhsky District, Vologda Oblast, Russia. The population was 9 in 2002.

== Geography ==
Silinskaya-2 is located 34 km west of Verkhovazhye (the district's administrative centre) by road. Bushnitskaya is the nearest rural locality.
