= Dubrova, Lipetskoye Rural Settlement, Verkhovazhsky District, Vologda Oblast =

Dubrova Дуброва
- Village
- Location within Vologda Oblast Location within Russia
- Coordinates: 60°24′N 41°43′E
- Country: Russia
- Region: Vologda Oblast
- District: Verkhovazhsky District
- Time zone: UTC+3:00

Dubrova (Russian: Дуброва) is a rural locality (a village) in Lipetskoye Rural Settlement, Verkhovazhsky District, Vologda Oblast, Russia. The population was 6 as of 2002.

== Geography ==
The distance to Verkhovazhye is 71.7 km, to Leushinskaya is 4 km. Nikulinskaya, Plyoso, Leushinskaya are the nearest rural localities.
