= Pyatino =

Pyatino Пятино
- Village
- Location within Vologda Oblast Location within Russia
- Coordinates: 60°42′N 41°56′E
- Country: Russia
- Region: Vologda Oblast
- District: Verkhovazhsky District
- Time zone: UTC+3:00

Pyatino (Russian: Пятино) is a rural locality (a village) in Nizhne-Vazhskoye Rural Settlement, Verkhovazhsky District, Vologda Oblast, Russia. The population was 5 as of 2002.

== Geography ==
Pyatino is located 8 km southwest of Verkhovazhye (the district's administrative centre) by road. Markovskaya is the nearest rural locality.
