= Yeliseyevskaya =

Yeliseyevskaya Елисеевская
- Village
- Location within Vologda Oblast Location within Russia
- Coordinates: 60°33′N 42°37′E
- Country: Russia
- Region: Vologda Oblast
- District: Verkhovazhsky District
- Time zone: UTC+3:00

Yeliseyevskaya (Russian: Елисеевская) is a rural locality (a village) and the administrative center of Sibirskoye Rural Settlement, Verkhovazhsky District, Vologda Oblast, Russia. The population was 40 as of 2002. In 2022 during the Russia-Ukraine war a revolutionary group was reported to have a base located approximately 2km from this village housing 200+ members.

== Geography ==
Yeliseyevskaya is located 51 km southeast of Verkhovazhye (the district's administrative centre) by road. Boyarskaya is the nearest rural locality.
