= Zakharovskaya, Irkutsk Oblast =

Zakharovskaya Захаровская
- Village
- Location within Irkutsk Oblast Location within Russia
- Coordinates: 52°58′N 103°44′E
- Country: Russia
- Region: Irkutsk Oblast
- District: Bokhansky District
- Time zone: UTC+8:00

Zakharovskaya (Russian: Захаровская) is a rural locality (a village) in Bokhansky District, Irkutsk Oblast, Russia. Population: 132 (2010 census);

== Geography ==
This rural locality is located 21 kilometres (13 mi) from Bokhan (the district's administrative centre), 84 kilometres (52 mi) from Irkutsk (capital of Irkutsk Oblast) and 4,439 kilometres (2,758 mi) from Moscow. Shipnyagovka is the nearest rural locality.
