= Zakharovskoye, Ustyuzhensky District, Vologda Oblast =

Zakharovskoye Захаровское
- Village
- Location within Vologda Oblast Location within Russia
- Coordinates: 58°46′N 36°21′E
- Country: Russia
- Region: Vologda Oblast
- District: Ustyuzhensky District
- Time zone: UTC+3:00

Zakharovskoye (Russian: Захаровское) is a rural locality (a village) in Zalesskoye Rural Settlement, Ustyuzhensky District, Vologda Oblast, Russia. The population was 5 as of 2002. There are 2 streets.

== Geography ==
Zakharovskoye is located 14 km (8.7 mi) southwest of Ustyuzhna (the district's administrative centre) by road. Kvashnino is the nearest rural locality.
