= Dubrova, Chagodoshchensky District, Vologda Oblast =

Dubrova Дуброва
- Village
- Location within Vologda Oblast Location within Russia
- Coordinates: 58°51′N 35°37′E
- Country: Russia
- Region: Vologda Oblast
- District: Chagodoshchensky District
- Time zone: UTC+3:00

Dubrova (Russian: Дуброва) is a rural locality (a village) in Pokrovskoye Rural Settlement, Chagodoshchensky District, Vologda Oblast, Russia. The population was 8 as of 2002.

== Geography ==
Dubrova is located 51 km (32 mi) southeast of Chagoda (the district's administrative centre) by road. Selishche is the nearest rural locality.
