= Chushevitsy =

Chushevitsy Чушевицы
- Selo
- Location within Vologda Oblast Location within Russia
- Coordinates: 60°30′N 41°45′E
- Country: Russia
- Region: Vologda Oblast
- District: Verkhovazhsky District
- Time zone: UTC+3:00

Chushevitsy (Russian: Чушевицы) is a rural locality (a selo) and the administrative center of Chushevitskoye Rural Settlement, Verkhovazhsky District, Vologda Oblast, Russia. The population was 735 as of 2002. There are 18 streets.

== Geography ==
Chushevitsy is located 42 km southwest of Verkhovazhye (the district's administrative centre) by road. Shchekino is the nearest rural locality.
