= Verkhovazhsky District =

Verkhovazhsky District Верховажский район (Russian)
- District
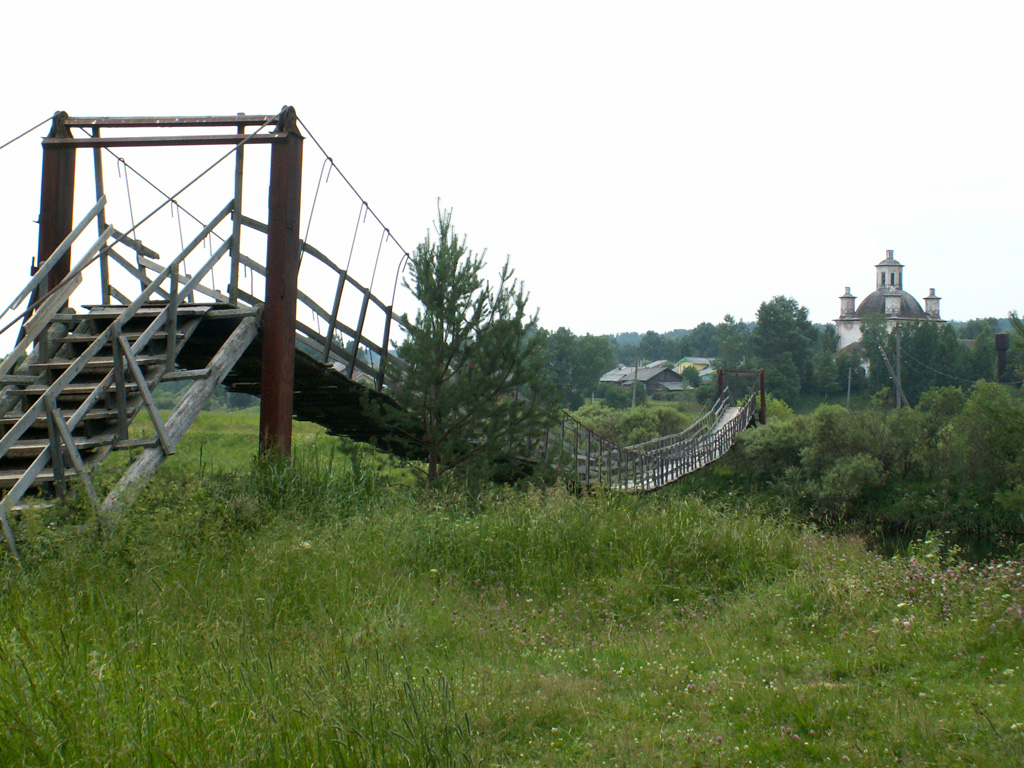
- Bridge over Vaga River in Chushevitsy

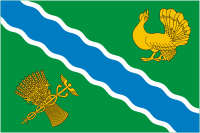
- Flag Coat of arms
- Location of Verkhovazhsky District in Vologda Oblast
- Coordinates: 60°44′N 42°03′E
- Country: Russia
- Federal subject: Vologda Oblast
- Established: July 15, 1929
- Administrative center: Verkhovazhye

Area
  - Total: 4,260 km^{2} (1,640 sq mi)

Population (2010 Census)
  - Total: 13,898
  - Density: 3.26/km^{2} (8.45/sq mi)
  - Urban: 0%
  - Rural: 100%

Administrative structure
  - Administrative divisions: 14 Selsoviets
  - Inhabited localities: 230 rural localities

Municipal structure
  - Municipally incorporated as: Verkhovazhsky Municipal District
  - Municipal divisions: 0 urban settlements, 12 rural settlements
- Time zone: UTC+3 (MSK)
- OKTMO ID: 19616000
- Website: http://www.adm-verhov.ru

Verkhovazhsky District (Russian: Верхова́жский райо́н) is an administrative and municipal district (raion), one of the twenty-six in Vologda Oblast, Russia. It is located in the north of the oblast and borders with Velsky District of Arkhangelsk Oblast in the north, Ustyansky District of Arkhangelsk Oblast in the northeast, Tarnogsky Districts in the east, Totemsky District in the south, Syamzhensky District in the southwest, Vozhegodsky District in the west, and with Konoshsky District of Arkhangelsk Oblast in the northwest. The area of the district is 4,260 square kilometers (1,640 sq mi). Its administrative center is the rural locality (a selo) of Verkhovazhye. District's population: 13,898 (2010 census); 16,346 (2002 Census); 18,560 (1989 Soviet census). The population of Verkhovazhye accounts for 36.2% of the district's total population.

== Geography ==
The area of the district is slightly elongated from west to east. It is crossed from south to north by the Vaga River (the name of the district's administrative center, Verkhovazhye, means literally "on the Upper Vaga") and its tributaries, the largest of which are the Kuloy in the east and the Pezhma in the west. Areas in the west and in the southwest of the district belong to the basins of the tributaries of the Kubena, in the basin of the Sukhona River. The whole area of the district belongs to the basin of the Northern Dvina River.

There are many swamps in the district, most of which are located in the valleys of the Vaga and the Kuloy. The basins of the Vaga and Kuloy Rivers are separated by the chain of hills which runs through the district from north to south.

Forests cover 85% of the district's territory. In particular, spruce occupies 44% of all forested areas, birch occupies 22%, pine–25%, and aspen–3% of all forested areas.

There are three natural monuments of local significance in the district protecting various landscapes,

- Listvennichny Bor Landscape Zakaznik (larch wood) 20 kilometers (12 mi) south of Verkhovazhye; protects a stand of Siberian larch
- Verkhovazhsky Les Landscape Zakaznik, in the valley of the Vaga close to Verkhovazhye; protects the landscapes of the Vaga valley
- Ivoninsky Bor Landscape Zakaznik, in the valley of the Kuloy at the border with Arkhangelsk Oblast; to protect glacial lake landscapes

In addition, the Chugly Park created by Illarion Dudorov 47 kilometers (29 mi) from Verkhovazhye, is protected as a natural monument since 2002.

== History ==
The area of Verkhovazhye and the upper course of the Vaga were already populated in the 13th century. Due to its location on one of the main waterways connecting central Russia and the White Sea (it was controlled first by Novgorodians, and after the fall of Novgorod was transferred to the Grand Duchy of Moscow), and the later construction of the surface road connecting Moscow and Arkhangelsk, by the 17th century Verkhovazhye became a major trading settlement. In the 18th century, industry was introduced, which included a distillery, an iron works, and a paper production plant. In the 18th century, Verkhovazhsky Posad (currently Verkhovazhye) was one of the main trading towns in the Russian North, holding two annual fairs.

In the course of the administrative reform carried out in 1708 by Peter the Great, the area was included into Archangelgorod Governorate. In 1780, the governorate was abolished and transformed into Vologda Viceroyalty. The latter was abolished in 1796, and the part of it which included Verkhovazhye became Vologda Governorate. Since 1780, the upper Vaga lands were part of Velsky Uyezd with the seat in the town of Velsk.

In 1929, several governorates, including Vologda Governorate, were merged into Northern Krai. On July 15, 1929, the uyezds were abolished, and Velsky Uyezd was split into Velsky, Verkhovazhsky, and Ustyansky Districts. Verkhovazhsky District became a part of Nyandoma Okrug of Northern Krai.

In 1930, the okrug was abolished, and the district was subordinated to the central administration of Northern Krai. On July 30, 1931, Verkhovazhsky District was merged into Velsky District (with the exception of Zhikhovsky Selsoviet, which was transferred to Totemsky District), and on January 25, 1935, it was re-established. In 1936, the krai was transformed into Northern Oblast, which, in turn, was split into Arkhangelsk Oblast and Vologda Oblast in 1937. Verkhovazhsky District remained in Vologda Oblast ever since.

== Economy ==
=== Industry ===
The economy of the district is based on timber industry, which is, however, declining steadily. There is also food industry, mainly bread baking.

=== Agriculture ===
In 2010, three collective farms, eleven privately owned mid-scale farms, and one private small-scale farms operated in the district. The main agricultural specializations were cattle breeding and flax growing. The flax growing, which was a traditional occupation of the peasants in the area, is considered to be a priority.

=== Transportation ===
One of the principal highways in Russia, M8, which connects Moscow and Arkhangelsk, crosses the district from south to north, bypassing Verkhovazhye. There are also local roads, with the bus traffic originating from Verkhovazhye.

None of the rivers are navigable within the limits of the district.

== Culture and recreation ==
The district contains 174 objects classified as cultural and historical heritage of local significance. Most of these are wooden farms and churches built prior to 1917.

The only state museum in the district is the Historical Museum of Verkhovazhsky District, located in the selo of Verkhovazhye.
