= Verkhovazhye =

Verkhovazhye Верховажье
- Selo
- Interactive map of Verkhovazhye
- Location of Verkhovazhye Verkhovazhye (Vologda Oblast)
- Coordinates: 60°44′N 42°03′E
- Country: Russia
- Federal subject: Vologda Oblast
- Administrative district: Verkhovazhsky District
- Selsoviet: Verkhovazhsky Selsoviet

Population (2010 Census)
  - Total: 5,025
  - Estimate (2021): 4,843 (−3.6%)

Administrative status
  - Capital of: Verkhovazhsky District, Verkhovazhsky Selsoviet

Municipal status
  - Municipal district: Verkhovazhsky Municipal District
  - Rural settlement: Verkhovazhskoye Rural Settlement
  - Capital of: Verkhovazhsky Municipal District, Verkhovazhskoye Rural Settlement
- Time zone: UTC+3 (MSK)
- Postal code: 162300
- OKTMO ID: 19616404101

Verkhovazhye (Russian: Верхова́жье) is a rural locality (a selo) and the administrative center of Verkhovazhsky District of Vologda Oblast, Russia, located on the right bank of the Vaga River. It also serves as the administrative center of Verkhovazhsky Selsoviet, one of the fourteen selsoviets into which the district is administratively divided. Municipally, it is the administrative center of Verkhovazhskoye Rural Settlement. Population: 5,025 (2010 census); 5,206 (2002 census); 4,684 (1989 Soviet census).

== Etymology ==
The name of Verkhovazhye means literally "on the Upper Vaga".

== History ==
The area of Verkhovazhye and the upper course of the Vaga were populated already in the 13th century. Due to its location on one of the main waterways connecting central Russia and the White Sea (it was controlled first by Novgorodians, and after the fall of Novgorod was transferred to the Grand Duchy of Moscow), and the later construction of the surface road connecting Moscow and Arkhangelsk, by the 17th century Verkhovazhye was a major trading settlement. It was first mentioned in the 17th century, and in 1678 it became a posad, a semi-urban settlement. In the 18th century industry was introduced, which included a distillery, an iron works, and a paper production plant. In the 18th century, Verkhovazhnsky Posad (currently Verkhovazhye) was one of the main trading towns in the Russian North, holding two annual fairs. In 1810, a secondary school was opened.

In the course of the administrative reform carried out in 1708 by Peter the Great the area was included into Archangelgorod Governorate. Vaga volosts were explicitly mentioned as one of the towns included in the governorate. In 1780, the governorate was abolished and transformed into Vologda Viceroyalty. The latter was abolished in 1796, and the part of it which included Verkhovazhye was made Vologda Governorate. Since 1780, the upper Vaga lands were part of Velsky Uyezd with the administrative center in the town of Velsk. On July 15, 1929, the uyezds were abolished, and Velsky Uyezd was split into Velsky, Verkhovazhsky, and Ustyansky Districts. Verkhovazhye became the administrative center of Verkhovazhsky District. On July 30, 1931, Verkhovazhsky District was merged into Velsky District, and on January 25, 1935, it was reestablished.

== Economy ==
=== Industry ===
The economy is based on timber industry. Food industry is also present.

=== Transportation ===
One of the principal highways in Russia, M8, which connects Moscow and Arkhangelsk, runs along the left bank of the Vaga, bypassing Verkhovazhye. There are also local roads, with the bus traffic originating from Verkhovazhye.

== Culture and recreation ==
The district contains forty-one objects classified as cultural and historical heritage of local significance.

The only state museum in Verkhovazhye is the Historical Museum of Verkhovazhsky District.
