= Krestetsky District =

Krestetsky District Крестецкий район (Russian)
- District
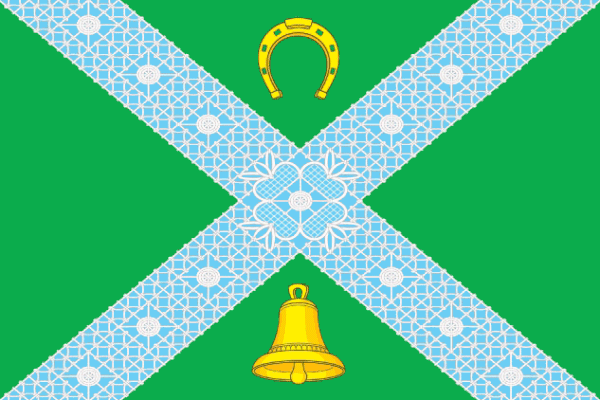
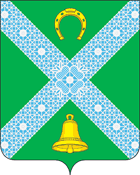
- Flag Coat of arms
- Location of Krestetsky District in Novgorod Oblast
- Coordinates: 58°15′N 32°31′E
- Country: Russia
- Federal subject: Novgorod Oblast
- Established: October 1, 1927
- Administrative center: Kresttsy

Area
  - Total: 2,790.63 km^{2} (1,077.47 sq mi)

Population (2010 Census)
  - Total: 12,940
  - Density: 4.637/km^{2} (12.01/sq mi)
  - Urban: 67.4%
  - Rural: 32.6%

Administrative structure
  - Administrative divisions: 1 Urban-type settlements, 4 Settlements
  - Inhabited localities: 1 urban-type settlements, 136 rural localities

Municipal structure
  - Municipally incorporated as: Krestetsky Municipal District
  - Municipal divisions: 1 urban settlements, 4 rural settlements
- Time zone: UTC+3 (MSK)
- OKTMO ID: 49614000
- Website: http://www.adm-krestcy.ru/

Krestetsky District (Russian: Кресте́цкий райо́н) is an administrative and municipal district (raion), one of the twenty-one in Novgorod Oblast, Russia. It is located in the center of the oblast and borders with Malovishersky District in the north, Okulovsky District in the northeast, Valdaysky District in the southeast, Demyansky District in the south, Parfinsky District in the southwest, and with Novgorodsky District in the northwest. The area of the district is 2,790.63 square kilometers (1,077.47 sq mi). Its administrative center is the urban locality (a work settlement) of Kresttsy. Population: 12,940 (2010 census); 15,667 (2002 Census); 16,957 (1989 Soviet census). The population of Kresttsy accounts for 67.4% of the district's total population.

== Geography ==
The district is located between the Valdai Hills and the Ilmen Depression. The eastern part of the district lies in the Valdai Hills and is higher than the western part. There are lakes located there, and many of the rivers in the district have their source in the eastern part. 81% of the district is covered by forests.

The main river in the district is the Kholova, a left tributary of the Msta. The Kholova crosses the district from south to north. The Msta makes a short detour to the district in its northern part. The rivers in the eastern and central parts of the district drain into the Kholova and its tributaries. The western end of the district is adjacent to Lake Ilmen. The rivers in the western part of the district, including the Nisha and the Mayata, drain into Lake Ilmen. The Yamnitsa River in the south of the district flows south and is a tributary of the Polomet River, in the basin of the Pola. A stretch of the Polomet crosses the southern tip of the district as well.

== History ==
Kresttsy (Krestetsky Pogost) was first mentioned in a chronicle in 1393. At the time, the area was a part of Derevskaya Pyatina of the Novgorod Republic. In the end of the 15th century, together with Novgorod, it became a part of the Grand Duchy of Moscow. In the course of the administrative reform carried out in 1708 by Peter the Great, the area was included into Ingermanland Governorate (known since 1710 as Saint Petersburg Governorate). In 1727, separate Novgorod Governorate was split off. In 1776, Kresttsy was chartered and became the seat of Krestetsky Uyezd of Novgorod Viceroyalty. In 1796, the viceroyalty was transformed into Novgorod Governorate. In 1796, the uyezd was abolished, but was re-established in 1802. The area was located along the road connecting Moscow and St. Petersburg, and Kresttsy developed as a major trade center. However, in 1851, the Moscow – Saint Petersburg Railway was opened, which bypassed Kresttsy. This undermined the importance of the area, which eventually went into decline. In 1918, a considerable part of Krestetsky Uyezd was split off to form Malovishersky Uyezd, and in 1922, it was abolished and split between Malovishersky, Valdaysky, and Novgorodsky Uyezds. In 1926, Kresttsy lost the town status and became a selo.

In August 1927, the governorates and uyezds were abolished. Krestetsky District, with the administrative center in the selo of Kresttsy, was established within Novgorod Okrug of Leningrad Oblast effective October 1, 1927. It included parts of former Malovishersky and Valdaysky Uyezds. On July 23, 1930, the okrugs were abolished, and the districts were directly subordinated to the oblast. On January 4, 1931, Kamzovsky Selsoviet was granted Estonian ethnic status, but was abolished on April 14, 1939. On January 1, 1932, a part of Mstinsky District was merged into Krestetsky District. On November 9, 1938, Kresttsy was granted work settlement status. On March 11, 1941, the territories from Mstinsky District which had previously been merged into Krestetsky District were returned to re-established Mstinsky District. Krestetsky District was not occupied during World War II, though it was located close to the front line. On July 5, 1944, Krestetsky District was transferred to newly established Novgorod Oblast, where it remained ever since. On February 1, 1963, in the course of the Nikita Khrushchev's administrative reform, the district was transformed into Krestetsky Industrial District with all of its selsoviets transferred to Valdaysky District. On January 14, 1965, this was reverted, although the new borders were different.

== Economy ==
=== Industry ===
The industry in the district is mainly represented by timber industry enterprises. In Kresttsy, there is a factory producing traditional New Year decorations and a factory related to traditional handicrafts.

=== Agriculture ===
There are two large-scale agricultural enterprises in the district, specializing in poultry and pork production. As of 2011, there are also eight collective farms and twenty-one mid-scale private farms.

=== Transportation ===
The M10 highway which connects Moscow and St. Petersburg crosses the district from southeast to northwest. In particular, Kresttsy is located on the highway. There are road connections to Malaya Vishera (starting in Kresttsy) and to Staraya Russa via Pola. There are also local roads.

Kresstsy has a railway connection to Valday. There is no passenger traffic, but the railway is used for cargo traffic.

== Culture and recreation ==
The district contains 9 cultural heritage monuments of federal significance and additionally 176 objects classified as cultural and historical heritage of local significance. The monuments protected at the federal levels are archaeological sites and the Tatishchev Estate in the village of Ust-Volma. The estate is currently abandoned, but reconstruction plans are under consideration.

The only museum in the district is the Krestetsky District Museum, located in Kresttsy, with a branch in the village of Ruchyi.

== Notable residents ==
- Vladimir Novikov (1907–2000), politician
