= Okulovsky District =

Okulovsky District Окуловский район (Russian)
- District
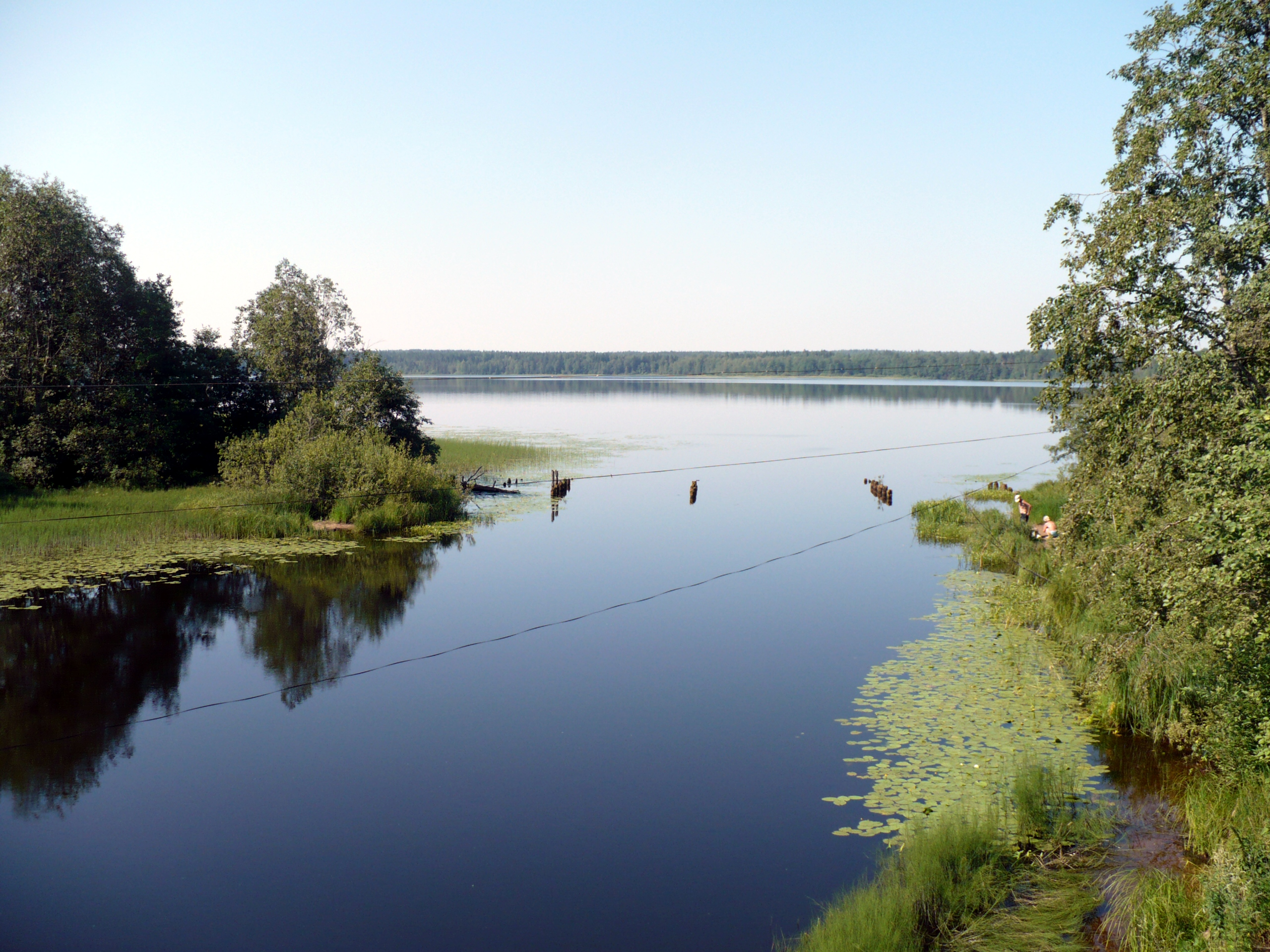
- Lake Peretno and the source of the Peretna River

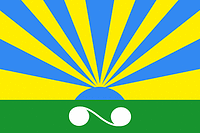
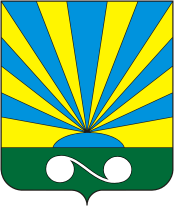
- Flag Coat of arms
- Location of Okulovsky District in Novgorod Oblast
- Coordinates: 58°23′N 33°18′E
- Country: Russia
- Federal subject: Novgorod Oblast
- Established: October 1, 1927
- Administrative center: Okulovka

Area
  - Total: 2,500 km^{2} (970 sq mi)

Population (2010 Census)
  - Total: 25,808
  - Density: 10/km^{2} (27/sq mi)
  - Urban: 71.6%
  - Rural: 28.4%

Administrative structure
  - Administrative divisions: 1 Towns of district significance, 2 Urban-type settlements, 4 Settlements
  - Inhabited localities: 1 cities/towns, 2 urban-type settlements, 199 rural localities

Municipal structure
  - Municipally incorporated as: Okulovsky Municipal District
  - Municipal divisions: 3 urban settlements, 4 rural settlements
- Time zone: UTC+3 (MSK)
- OKTMO ID: 49628000
- Website: https://www.okuladm.ru/

Okulovsky District (Russian: Оку́ловский райо́н) is an administrative and municipal district (raion), one of the twenty-one in Novgorod Oblast, Russia. It is located in the center of the oblast and borders with Lyubytinsky District in the northeast, Borovichsky District in the east, Bologovsky District of Tver Oblast in the southeast, Valdaysky District in the southwest, Krestetsky District in the west, and with Malovishersky District in the northwest. The area of the district is 2,500 square kilometers (970 sq mi). Its administrative center is the town of Okulovka. Population: 25,808 (2010 census); 31,153 (2002 Census); 36,852 (1989 Soviet census). The population of Okulovka accounts for 48.3% of the district's total population.

== Geography ==
Okulovsky District is located in the Valdai Hills in the basin of the Msta River. The rivers in the eastern part of the district drain into the Msta, and a stretch of the Msta forms the border of Okulovsky District with Borovichsky and Lyubytinsky Districts. The northern part of the district belongs to the basin of the Verebye, and the western part belongs to the basin of the Kholova, both rivers being the left tributaries of the Msta.

There are many lakes in the district, the biggest ones being Lake Zaozyorye and Lake Borovno, both located in the south of the district.

Forests cover the area of 900 square kilometers (350 sq mi). In the center, coniferous forests (spruce and pine) dominate, and in the south, west, and northwest, there are mixed forests (spruce, pine, birch, and aspen). Swamps occupy considerable areas in the district.

The southern part of the district belongs to the Valdaysky National Park which is shared between Okulovsky, Valdaysky, and Demyansky Districts.

== History ==
Settlements located in the current area of the district were first mentioned in chronicles in 1495 as being a part of Derevskaya Pyatina. Fast economical development of the region started during and after the construction of the Nikolayevskaya Railway which connected Moscow and St. Petersburg in 1851. Okulovka and Uglovka developed first as settlements serving the railway stations, and eventually industries developed there. In the 19th and in the beginning of the 20th century, the area was split between three uyezds of Novgorod Governorate: Borovichsky, Krestetsky, and Valdaysky. In 1919, Malovishersky Uyezd was established, and in 1922 Krestetsky Uyezd was abolished and split between Malovishersky, Valdaysky, and Novgorodsky Uyezds.

In August 1927, the governorates and uyezds were abolished. Okulovsky District, with the administrative center in the settlement of Okulovka, was established within Borovichi Okrug of Leningrad Oblast effective October 1, 1927. It included parts of former Borovichskaya Volost of Borovichsky Uyezd, Lokotskaya Volost of Valdaysky Uyezd, and Okulovskaya and Sukhlovskaya Volosts of Malovishersky Uyezd. On July 23, 1930, the okrugs were abolished, and the districts were directly subordinated to the oblast. On September 20, 1931, Torbinsky District was abolished and merged into Okulovsky District. On January 1, 1932, a part of abolished Uglovsky District was merged into Okulovsky District. Okulovsky District was not occupied by German troops during World War II; however, being adjacent to the front line, it played an important role. On July 5, 1944, Okulovsky District was transferred to newly established Novgorod Oblast, where it remained ever since. On February 1, 1963, the district was transformed into Okulovsky Rural District in the course of the Nikita Khrushchev's abortive administrative reform. This was reverted on January 12, 1965. In the meanwhile, on December 11, 1964, the urban-type settlements of Okulovka and Parakhino-Poddubye were merged to form the town of Okulovka, which became the administrative center of Okulovsky District.

=== Abolished districts ===
Effective October 1, 1927, Torbinsky District with the administrative center in the selo of Torbino was established as a part of Borovichi Okrug of Leningrad Oblast. On September 20, 1931, Torbinsky District was abolished and merged into Okulovsky District.

Another district established effective October 1, 1927 as a part of Borovichi Okrug of Leningrad Oblast was Uglovsky District, with the administrative center in the railway station of Uglovka. On January 1, 1932, Uglovsky District was abolished and split between Borovichsky, Okulovsky, and Bologovsky Districts.

== Economy ==
=== Industry ===
There are three big factories in Okulovka, which produce wire, electronics, and furniture, and a limestone processing plant in Uglovka. The rest of the enterprises of the district operate in textile industry and in food industry.

=== Agriculture ===
Agriculture in Okulovsky District is represented by a number of small-scale farms, mostly involved in cattle breeding.

=== Transportation ===
The Moscow – Saint Petersburg Railway crosses the district from south to north. This was the first long-distance railway constructed in Russia, built in a straight line and opened in 1851. The main railway stations in the district are Okulovka, Uglovka, Borovyonka, and Torbino. In Uglovka, the railway line to Borovichi branches off east, and in Okulovka, the line to Nebolchi via Lyubytino branches off northeast, then turns north. Okulovka is a terminal station for suburban trains, which leave in three directions: to Bologoye, Malaya Vishera, and Nebolchi.

The district has a developed road network, which includes connections to Borovichi, Tikhvin via Lyubytino, Bologoye via Lykoshino, and Kresttsy.

== Culture and recreation ==
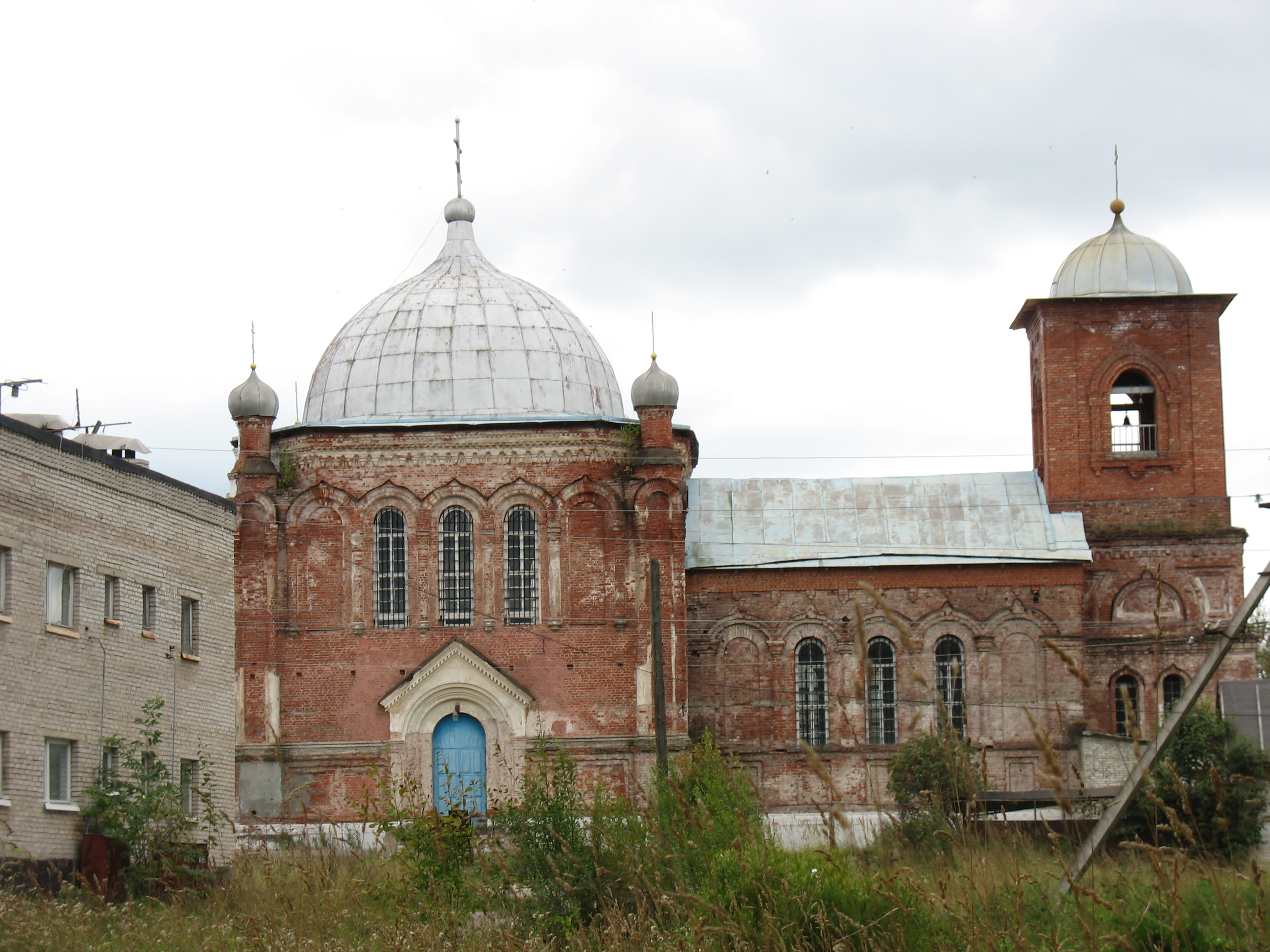
Church of the Nativity of Christ in Uglovka

The district contains 3 cultural heritage monuments of federal significance and additionally 177 objects classified as cultural and historical heritage of local significance. All of the federal monuments are archaeological sites.

Okulovka is home to the Miklukho-Maklay Okulovka District Museum. It is named after Nicholas Miklouho-Maclay, a Russian ethnographer notable for his studies of indigenous population of Papua. Miklouho-Maclay was born on the territory of the modern district, where his father, a construction engineer, was involved in the railroad construction.
