= Novgorod Viceroyalty =

1776–1796 unit of Russia

Coordinates: 58°33′N 31°17′E

Novgorod Viceroyalty Новгоро́дское наме́стничество
- Viceroyalty of Russian Empire
- 1776–1796
- Capital: Novgorod
- History
  - Established: September 5 [O.S. August 24] 1776
  - Disestablished: December 23 [O.S. December 12] 1796

Novgorod Viceroyalty (Russian: Новгоро́дское наме́стничество, romanized: Novgorodskoye namestnichestvo) was an administrative-territorial unit (namestnichestvo) of the Russian Empire, which existed in 1776–1796. The seat of the Viceroyalty was located in Novgorod.

The viceroyalty was established by a decree (ukase) of Catherine II on September 5 [O.S. August 24], 1776. It was subdivided into two oblasts: Novgorod and Olonets Oblast. The predecessor of Novgorod Viceroyalty was Novgorod Governorate with the seat in Novgorod. Tver Province which belonged to Novgorod Governorate, was transformed into Tver Viceroyalty, and the rest of the governorate became Novgorod Viceroyalty. Novgorod Oblast included ten uyezds, and, in particular, Kresttsy and Kirillov were chartered to become uyezd towns. Olonets Oblast included five uyezds, and Petrozavodsk was chartered in 1777.

As with most of other governorates and viceroyalties established in the 1770s–1780s, the establishment of Vologda Viceroyalty was a part of the reform attempting to have a tighter control of local matters by the Russian autocracy. The reform, in turn, was facilitated by the Pugachev's Rebellion of 1774–1775.

The geographical location of the viceroyalty, which was elongated from south to north, was inconvenient and lead to exchange of lands with neighboring viceroyalties. During this period, Novgorod Viceroyalty bordered with Vologda Viceroyalty in the northeast, Yaroslavl Governorate and Tver Viceroyalty in the south, Pskov Governorate in the west, Saint Petersburg Governorate and Sweden in the northwest. In terms of the modern political division of Russia, Novgorod Viceroyalty in this period comprised the areas of what is currently Novgorod Oblast, Murmansk Oblast, the greater part of the Republic of Karelia, as well as parts of Vologda and Leningrad Oblasts and minor areas of Tver Oblast.

On December 11, 1781 Olonets Oblast and Novoladozhsky Uyezd of Novgorod Oblast were transferred from Novgorod Viceroyalty to Saint Petersburg Governorate.

After 1781, the viceroyalty consisted of ten uyezds,

- Novgorodsky Uyezd (with the administrative center located in Novgorod);
- Belozersky Uyezd (Belozersk);
- Borovitsky Uyezd (Borovichi);
- Cherepovetsky Uyezd (Cherepovets);
- Kirillovsky Uyezd (Kirillov);
- Krestetsky Uyezd (Kresttsy);
- Starorussky Uyezd (Staraya Russa);
- Tikhvinsky Uyezd (Tikhvin);
- Ustyuzhno-Zheleznopolsky Uyezd (Ustyuzhna);
- Valdaysky Uyezd (Valday).

In 1796, Olonets Viceroyalty was abolished and divided between Novgorod and Arkhangelsk Viceroyalties. After this event, Novgorod Viceroyalty was mentioned in official documents only as Novgorod Governorate.

== Governors ==
The administration of the viceroyalty was performed by a namestnik (vice-roy) and controlled by a governor general. The governors of Novgorod Viceroyalty were

- 1778-1781 Yakov Yefimovich Sivers (Jacob Sievers);
- 1783-1784 Yakov Ivanovich Bryus;
- 1785-1795 Nikolay Petrovich Arkharov.

The namestniks were

- 1778 Frants Nikolayevich Klichka;
- 1781-1782 Pyotr Stepanovich Protasov;
- 1783-1784 Alexander Yakovlevich Protasov;
- 1785 Pyotr Konovnitsyn;
- 1786-1793 Pyotr Fyodorovich Kvashnin-Samarin;
- 1794-1796 Pyotr Petrovich Mitusov.
