= Novgorodsky District =

Novgorodsky District Новгородский район (Russian)
- District
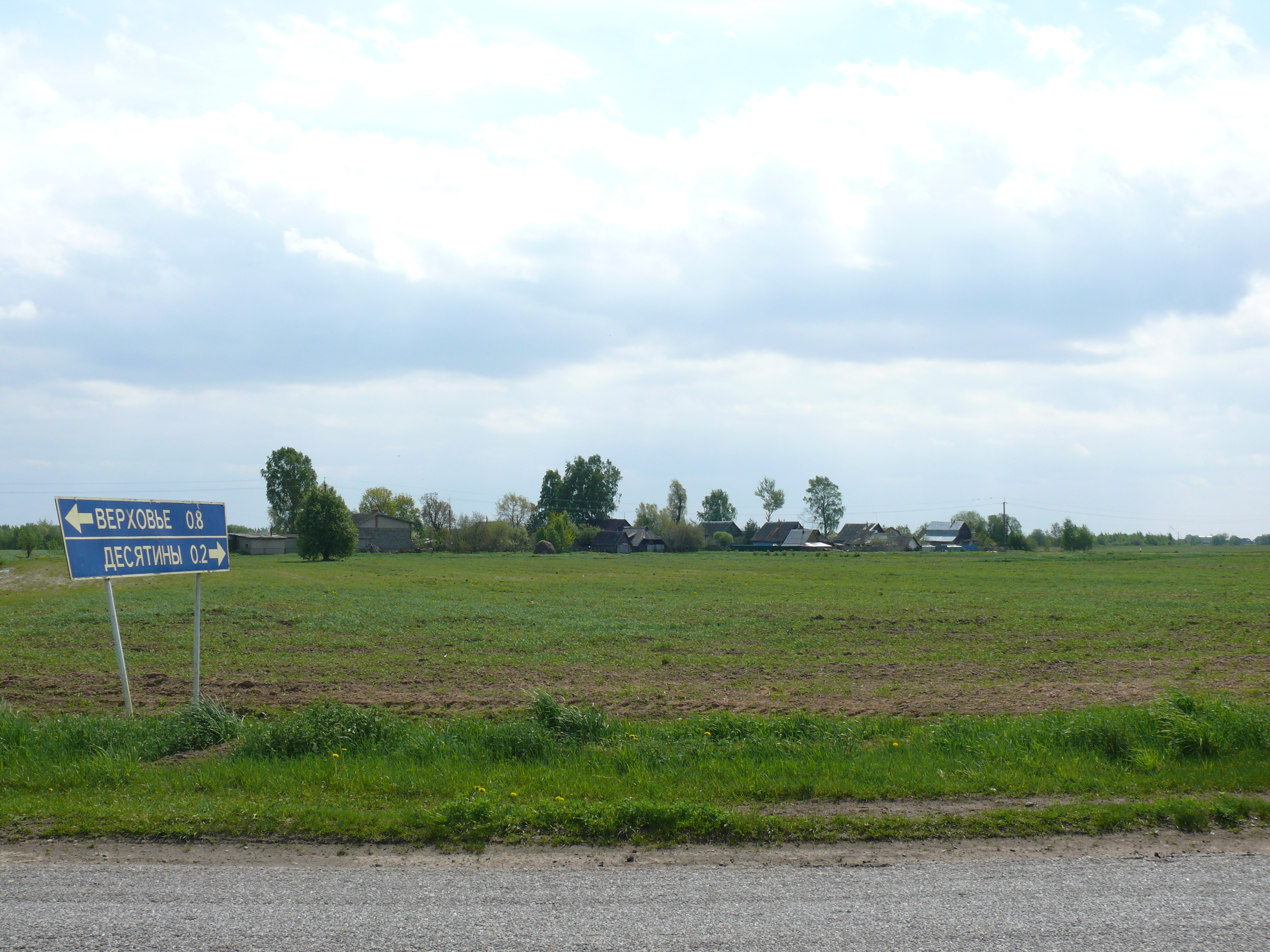
- The village of Desyatiny in Novgorodsky District

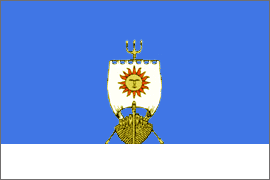
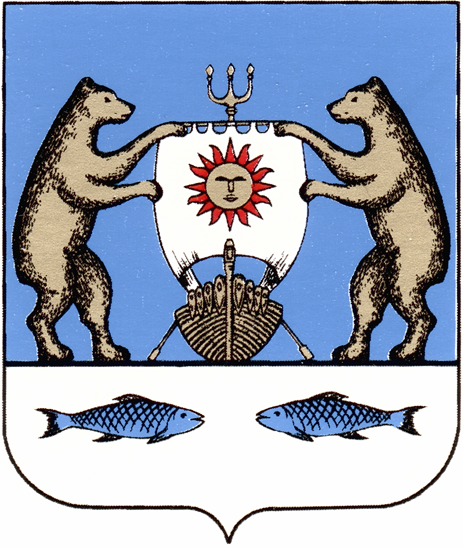
- Flag Coat of arms
- Location of Novgorodsky District in Novgorod Oblast
- Coordinates: 58°56′N 31°04′E
- Country: Russia
- Federal subject: Novgorod Oblast
- Established: October 1, 1927
- Administrative center: Veliky Novgorod

Area
  - Total: 4,600 km^{2} (1,800 sq mi)

Population (2010 Census)
  - Total: 57,673
  - Density: 13/km^{2} (32/sq mi)
  - Urban: 25.6%
  - Rural: 74.4%

Administrative structure
  - Administrative divisions: 2 Urban-type settlements, 8 Settlements
  - Inhabited localities: 2 urban-type settlements, 199 rural localities

Municipal structure
  - Municipally incorporated as: Novgorodsky Municipal District
  - Municipal divisions: 2 urban settlements, 8 rural settlements
- Time zone: UTC+3 (MSK)
- OKTMO ID: 49625000
- Website: https://novgorodskij-rayon.gosuslugi.ru/

Novgorodsky District (Russian: Новгородский район) is an administrative and municipal district (raion), one of the twenty-one in Novgorod Oblast, Russia. It is located in the southwest of the oblast and borders with Tosnensky District of Leningrad Oblast in the north, Chudovsky District in the northeast, Malovishersky District in the east, Krestetsky District in the southeast, Shimsky District in the southwest, Batetsky District in the west, and with Luzhsky District of Leningrad Oblast in the northwest. In the south, the district is limited by Lake Ilmen. The area of the district is 4,600 square kilometers (1,800 sq mi). Its administrative center is the city of Veliky Novgorod (which is not administratively a part of the district). Population: 57,673 (2010 census); 58,622 (2002 Census); 55,491 (1989 Soviet census). In terms of both area and population, this is the largest district in Novgorod Oblast.

== Geography ==
The district is located in the Ilmen Lowlands and is crossed by the Volkhov River from southwest to northeast, dividing the district into approximately equal areas. All rivers in the district drain into Lake Ilmen or into the Volkhov River and its main tributaries, including the Polist (left), the Vishera (right), and the Tigoda (left). A large portion of the Lake Ilmen coast belongs to Novgorodsky District. The biggest tributary of Lake Ilmen within the district is the Msta.

Woods occupy the area of 2,400 square kilometers (930 sq mi), which is more than a half of the total area of the district.

== History ==
The Volkhov River served as a major waterway, a part of the trade route from the Varangians to the Greeks, since medieval times. The city of Novgorod was one of the leading political, trading, and cultural centers of East Slavs since the 9th century, and its immediate vicinities were within the current boundaries of the district. Novgorod lands extended far to the north and to the northeast to the Arctic Ocean. In the end of the 15th century, Novgorod was defeated and annexed by the Grand Duchy of Moscow. From that time, Novgorod lands were subdivided into pyatinas, and the banks of the Volkhov, including the current area of the district, were a part of Vodskaya Pyatina.

In the course of the administrative reform carried out in 1708 by Peter the Great, the territory was included into Ingermanland Governorate (known since 1710 as Saint Petersburg Governorate). In 1727, separate Novgorod Governorate was split off. In 1776, the area was transferred to Novgorod Viceroyalty. In 1796, the viceroyalty was abolished and renamed Novgorod Governorate. The area was a part of Novgorodsky Uyezd.

In the 1810s and 1820s, military settlements were organized in Novgorod Governorate, in accordance with the project designed by Aleksey Arakcheyev, an influential statesman. The first area transferred to the military administration (in 1816) was Vysotskaya Volost of Novgorodsky Uyezd. Later, some other areas of Novgorodsky Uyezd were transferred to the military administration as well. The military settlements, however, were proven inefficient; in 1831 in particular, the local population participated in the Cholera Riots. The military administration was abolished in 1856.

In 1922, Krestetsky Uyezd of Novgorod Governorate was abolished and split between Novgorodsky, Malovishersky, and Valdaysky Uyezds. In 1927, a number of ethnic German and Latvian selsoviets were created in the uyezd.

In August 1927, the governorates and uyezds were abolished. Novgorodsky District, with the administrative center in the city of Novgorod, was established within Novgorod Okrug of Leningrad Oblast effective October 1, 1927. It included parts of former Novgorodsky Uyezd. On July 23, 1930, the okrugs were abolished, and the districts were directly subordinated to the oblast. The city of Novgorod was a part of the district until August 1930, when it was elevated in status to that of a city of oblast significance. On September 20, 1931, Medvedsky District was abolished and merged into Novgorodsky District. On January 1, 1932, a part of abolished Mstinsky District was merged into Novgorodsky District. On February 15, 1935, parts of Novgorodsky District were transferred to newly established Shimsky District. On March 11, 1941, parts of previously abolished Mstinsky District, which was merged into Novgorodsky District in 1932, were returned to Mstinsky District.

Between August 14, 1941 and February 3, 1944, parts of Novgorodsky District was occupied by German troops. On July 5, 1944, Novgorodsky District was transferred to newly established Novgorod Oblast, where it remained ever since. On February 1, 1963, the district was transformed into Novgorodsky Rural District in the course of the Nikita Khrushchev's abortive administrative reform. This was reverted on January 12, 1965.

=== Abolished districts ===
Effective October 1, 1927, Medvedsky District with the administrative center in the selo of Medved was established as well as a part of Novgorod Okrug of Leningrad Oblast. On September 20, 1931, Medvedsky District was abolished and merged into Novgorodsky District.

Effective October 1, 1927, Bronnitsky District with the administrative center in the selo of Bronnitsa was also established as a part of Novgorod Okrug of Leningrad Oblast. On March 11, 1931, the selo of Bronnitsa was renamed Msta, and the district was renamed Mstinsky. On January 1, 1932, Mstinsky District was abolished and split between Novgorodsky and Krestetsky Districts. On March 11, 1941, Mstinsky District was re-established. It also included parts of Krestetsky District. The administrative center of the district was located in Proletariy. Between October and December 1941, minor parts of Mstinsky District were occupied by German troops. On July 5, 1944, Mstinsky District was transferred to newly established Novgorod Oblast. On February 1, 1963, Mstinsky District was abolished and merged into Novgorodsky Rural District. After a sequence of administrative reforms, the area of former Mstinsky District was split between Novgorodsky and Krestetsky Districts when Novgorodsky Rural District was abolished on January 14, 1965.

== Administrative and municipal status ==
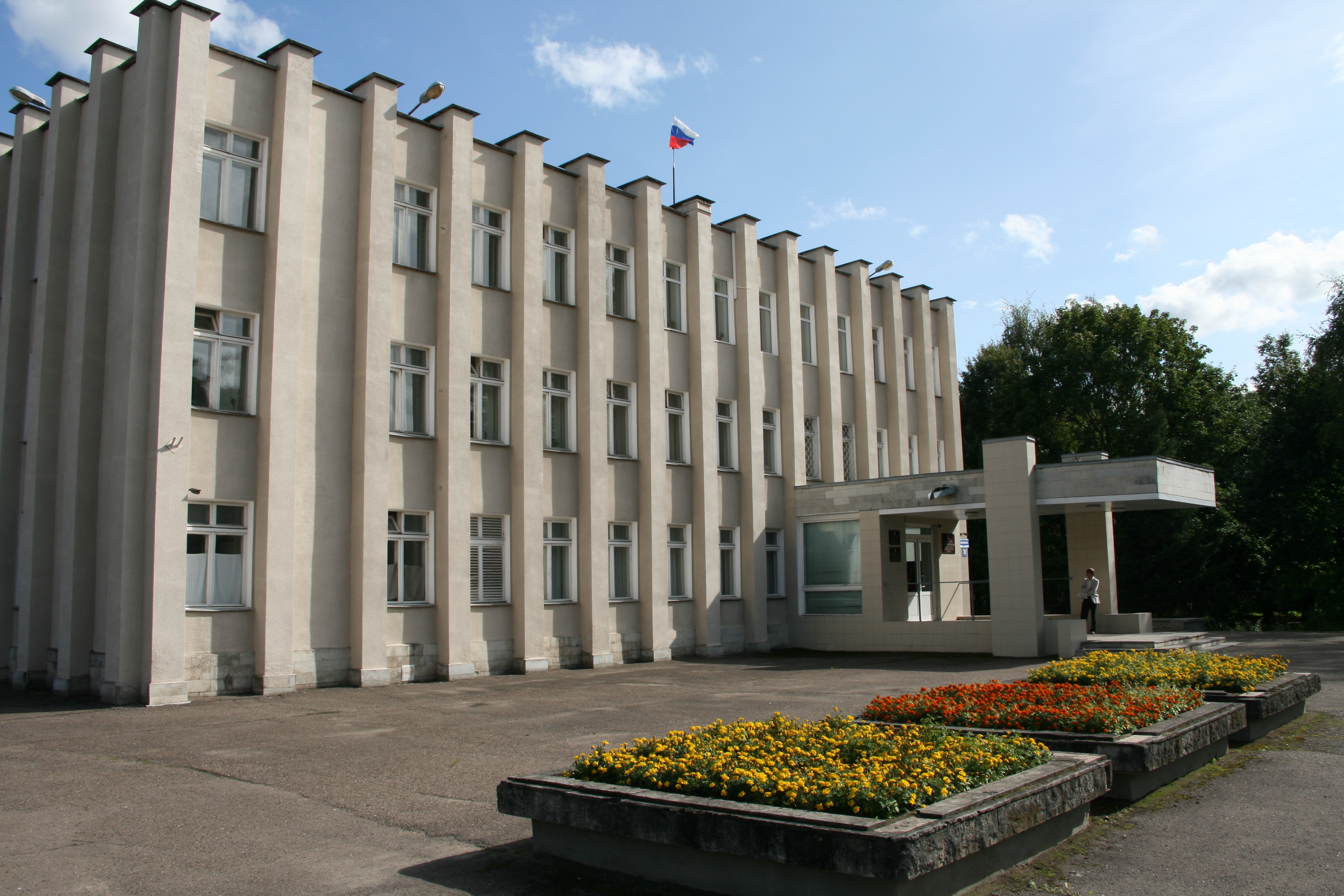
Novgorodsky District Administration building in Veliky Novgorod

Within the framework of administrative divisions, Novgorodsky District is one of the twenty-one in the oblast. The city of Veliky Novgorod serves as its administrative center, despite being incorporated separately as a city of oblast significance—an administrative unit with the status equal to that of the districts.

As a municipal division, the district is incorporated as Novgorodsky Municipal District. The city of oblast significance of Veliky Novgorod is incorporated separately from the district as Veliky Novgorod Urban Okrug.

== Economy ==
=== Industry ===
A number of industrial enterprises are located in the district. They specialize in the production of construction materials, textiles and clothing, ceramics, and food.

=== Agriculture ===
As of 2011, there were seventeen large- and mid-scale farms in the district, including two swine breeding farms, two poultry production enterprises, and a greenhouse enterprise. This constitutes the largest concentration of farms in Novgorod Oblast. The main agricultural specializations in the district are egg, meat, and milk production, as well as vegetable, potato, and crops growing.

=== Transportation ===
Veliky Novgorod is connected by railroads with Chudovo, St. Petersburg, and Luga. All these railroads run through the district.

The M10 highway connecting Moscow and St. Petersburg crosses the district, mostly following the left bank of the Volkhov River. Other roads connect Veliky Novgorod with Pskov and with Staraya Russa via Shimsk, with Luga, and with Malaya Vishera. There are also local roads.

The Volkhov and the Msta Rivers are navigable within the limits of Novgorodvsky District. However, there is no regular passenger navigation. Lake Ilmen is navigable as well.

== Culture ==
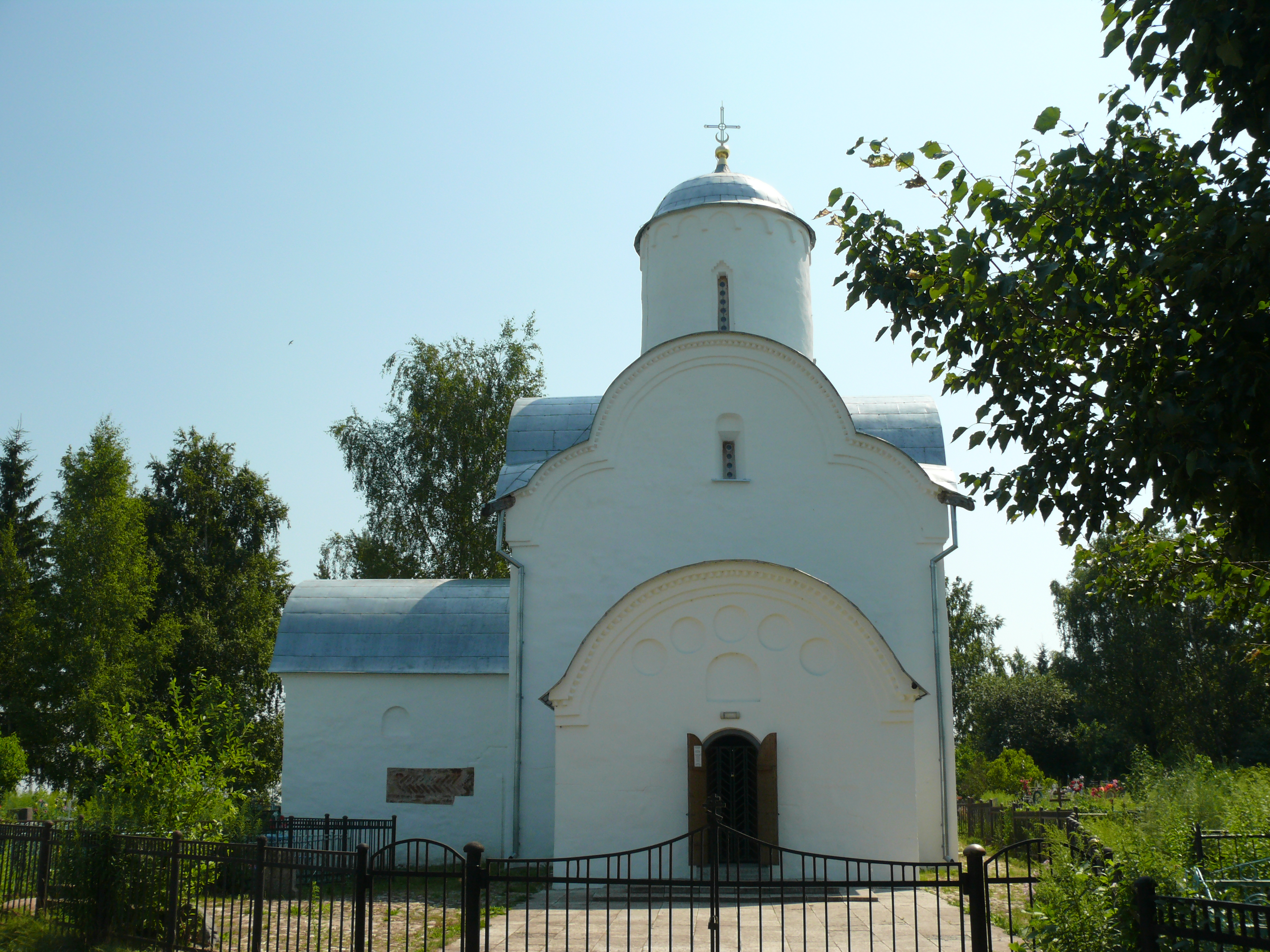
The Assumption Church in Volotovo

For a long time, between the 9th and the 15th centuries, Novgorod was one of the leading political and cultural centers of Rus', and the Volkhov River, which connects Novgorod to the Baltic Sea, was the key part of the trade route from the Varangians to the Greeks. This is why the surroundings of Veliky Novgorod and the banks of the Volkhov contain a large amount of historical, architectural, and archeological monuments, many of which were created in the Middle Ages. Some of these monuments have been included in the World Heritage list as a part of the site of Historic Monuments of Novgorod and Surroundings. In particular, the Saint Nicholas Church on Lipno Island (1292), the Nereditsa Church (1198), and the ruins of the Annunciation Church in Gorodishche (12th century) are all located within the district. Two more Middle-Age monuments, the Transfiguration Church in Kovalyovo and the Assumption Church in Volotovo, were destroyed during World War II and subsequently restored. Both contained Novgorodian frescoes of the 13th–14th centuries; the frescoes were partially restored as well. The Rurik hillfort, next to the Nereditsa Church, is an archeological site which was presumably an old location of the city of Novgorod. A number of old monasteries around Novgorod include the Khutyn Monastery (founded in the 13th century), the Derevyanitsky Monastery (1335), the Nikolo-Vyazhishchsky Monastery, and the Klopsky Monastery.

In total, the district contains 58 cultural heritage monuments of federal significance and additionally 125 objects classified as cultural and historical heritage of local significance.

== Notable residents ==
- Alexander Georgiev (born 1975 in Pyatilipy), draughts champion
- Maksym Timchenko (born 1975 in the town of Novoselitsy), CEO of energy company DTEK
