= Cherepovets Governorate =

Coordinates: 59°12′N 37°54′E

Cherepovets Governorate Череповецкая губерния
- Governorate of Soviet Union
- 1918–1927
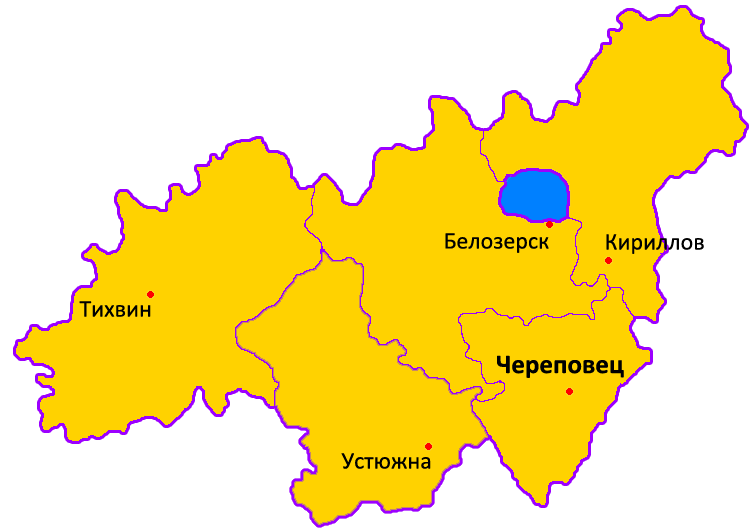
- Cherepovets Governorate in 1918
- Capital: Cherepovets
- History
  - Established: June 26 1918
  - Disestablished: August 1 1927
- Political subdivisions: five uyezds

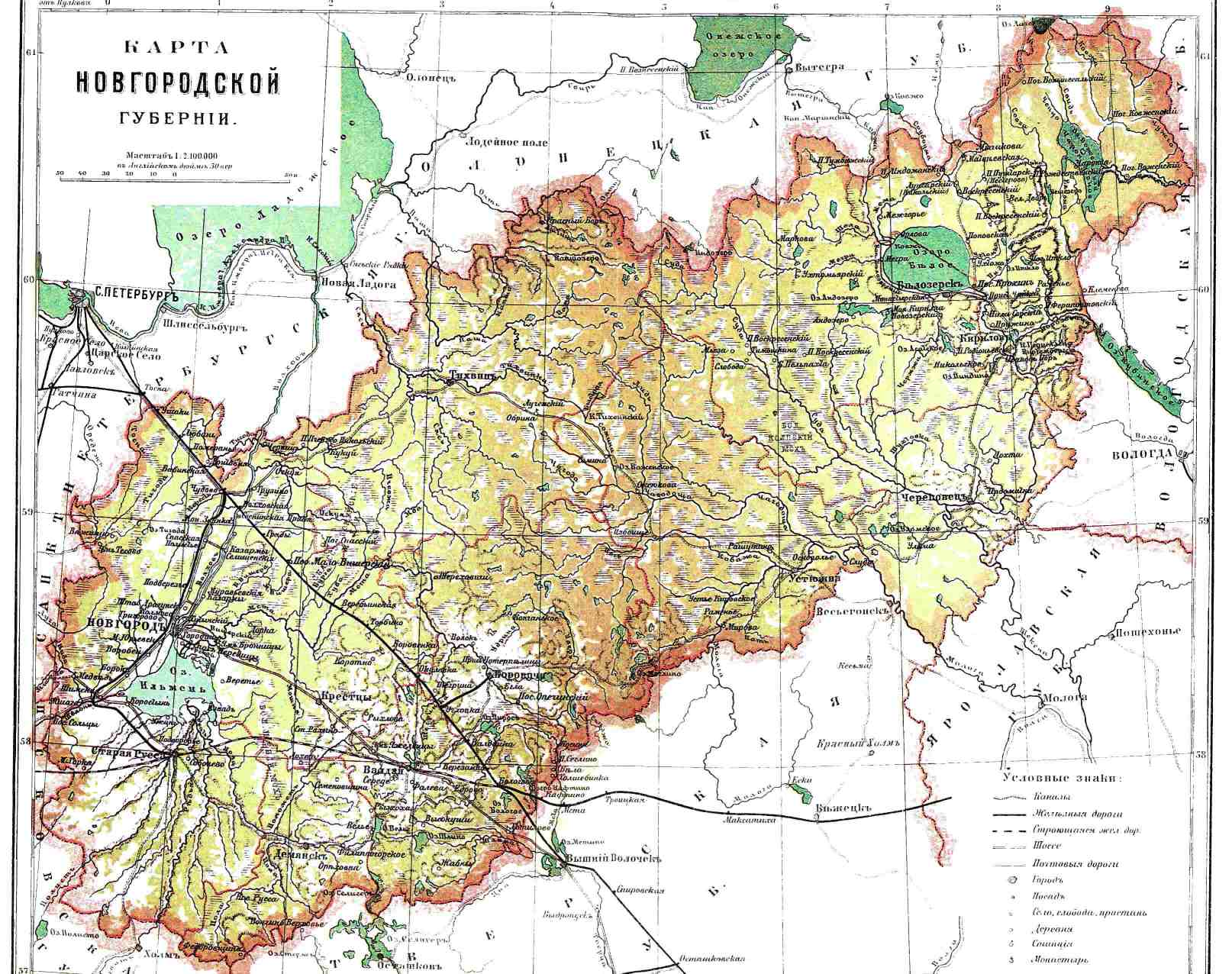
Map of Novgorod Governorate. The five uyezds in the northern and northwestern parts, more than a half of the area, split off to form Cherepovets Governorate.

Cherepovets Governorate (Russian: Череповецкая губерния, Cherepovetskaya guberniya) was a governorate (guberniya) of the Russian Soviet Federative Socialist Republic from 1918 to 1927. Its seat was in the city of Cherepovets. The governorate was located in the North of European Russia, and its territory is currently divided between Vologda, Novgorod, and Leningrad Oblasts.

== History ==
The governorate was established on June 26, 1918, by the People's Commissariat for Internal Affairs of the Russian Soviet Federative Socialist Republic. The territory of the governorate was formed from five uyezds which were previously a part of Novgorod Governorate (the uyezd centers are given in parentheses)

- Belozersky Uyezd (Belozersk);
- Cherepovetsky Uyezd (Cherepovets);
- Kirillovsky Uyezd (Kirillov);
- Tikhvinsky Uyezd (Tikhvin);
- Ustyuzhensky Uyezd (Ustyuzhna).

Between 1918 and 1921 parts of Pozhekhonsko-Volodarsky Uyezd of Yaroslavl Governorate were transferred to Cherepovetsky Uyezd, parts of Kirillovsky Uyezd were transferred to Kadnikovsky Uyezd of Vologda Governorate and Kargopolsky Uyezd of Olonets Governorate, and parts of Tikhvinsky Uyezd were transferred to Borovichsky and Malo-Vishersky Uyezds of Novgorod Governorate.

In 1924, the reform of the low-level administrative division in the governorate was performed. Some of the volosts were abolished in favor of selsoviets.

On August 1, 1927, Cherepovets Governorate was abolished, and its area was transformed into Cherepovets Okrug of Leningrad Oblast. Eventually, most of the area of the okrug (with the exception of lands around Tikhvin) were in 1937 included into newly established Vologda Oblast.
