= Malovishersky =

Malovishersky (masculine), Malovisherskaya (feminine), or Malovisherskoye (neuter) may refer to:

- Malovishersky District, a district in Novgorod Oblast, Russia
- Malovishersky Uyezd (1918–1927), an administrative division of Novgorod Governorate in the early Russian SFSR
- Malovisherskoye Urban Settlement, a municipal formation which the town of district significance of Malaya Vishera in Malovishersky District of Novgorod Oblast, Russia is incorporated as
