= Novgorod Province =

Novgorod Province may refer to:

- Novgorod Oblast, a federal subject of Russia
- Novgorod Governorate, an administrative division of the Russian Empire
- Novgorod Province, Novgorod Governorate, a subdivision of Saint Petersburg Governorate and, after 1727, of Novgorod Governorate
