= Kholova =

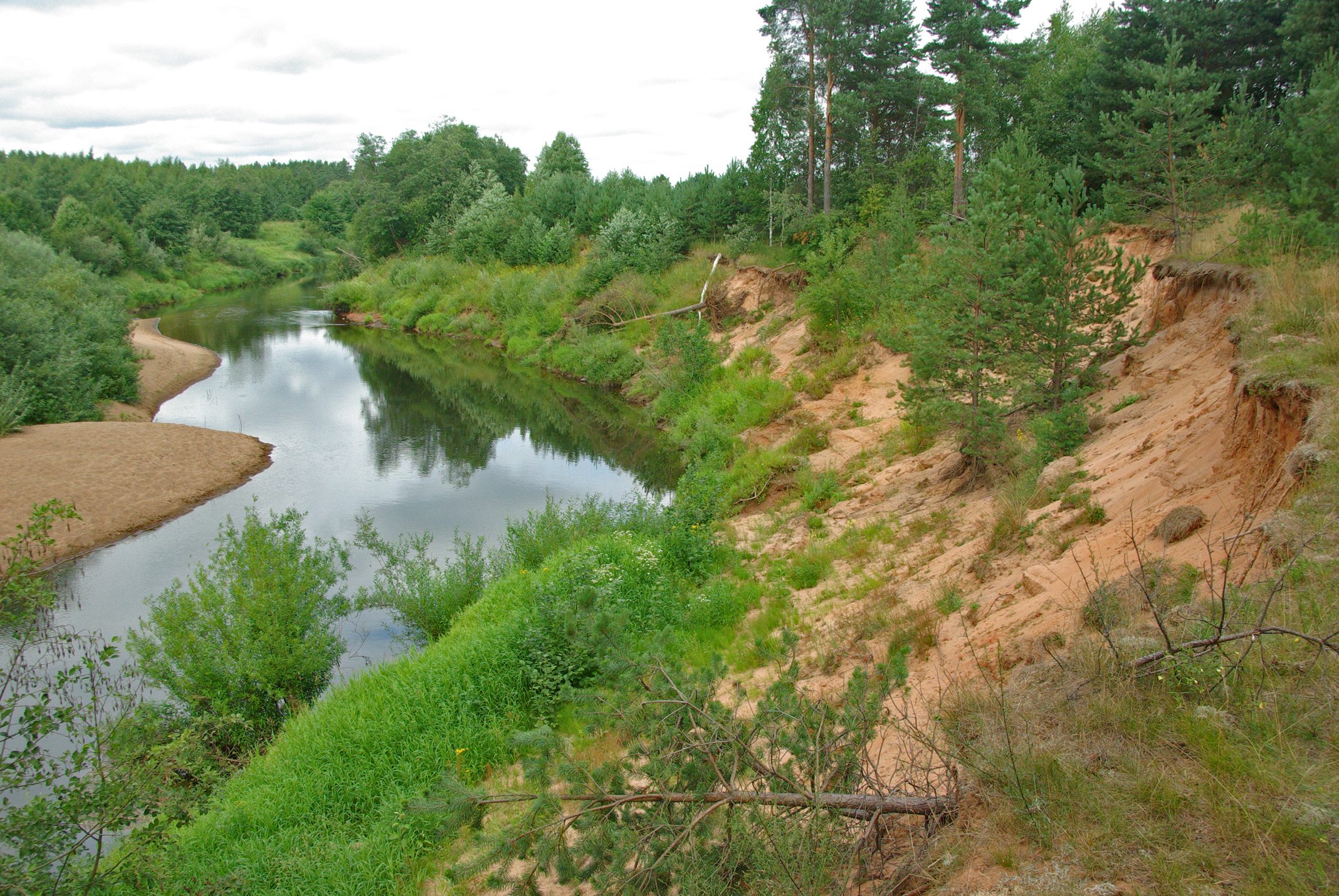
- Native name: Холова (Russian)

Location
- Country: Russia

Physical characteristics
- Mouth: Msta
  - coordinates: 58°33′28″N 32°13′46″E
- Length: 126 km (78 mi)
- Basin size: 1,900 km^{2} (730 sq mi)
- Discharge
  - average: 15.6 m^{3}/s (550 cu ft/s)

Basin features
- Progression: Msta→ Lake Ilmen→ Volkhov→ Lake Ladoga→ Neva→ Gulf of Finland

The Kholova (Russian: Холова) is a river in Krestetsky and Malovishersky Districts of Novgorod Oblast in Russia. It is a left tributary of the Msta. It is 126 kilometres (78 mi) long, and the area of its basin is 1,900 square kilometres (730 sq mi). The principal tributaries of the Kholova are the Khuba (right) and the Moshnya (left). The urban-type settlement of Kresttsy is located on the Kholova.

The source of the Kholova lies in Valday Hills, in the system of interconnected lakes at the border between Okulovsky and Krestetsky District. The river flows west, turns northwest, passes Kresttsy, turns north and enters Malovishersky District. Downstream of Kresttsy, it runs along the Ilmen Depression, which is almost flat. The mouth of the Kholova is near the village of Zakholovye.

The Kholova is the main river of Krestetsky District. Its basin comprises most of the area of the district, as well as minor areas in the southwestern parts of both the Okulovsky and Malovishersky districts.
