= Rushinovo =

Rushinovo (Russian: Рушиново) is the name of several rural localities in Russia:

- Rushinovo, Novgorod Oblast, a village in Novoselitskoye Settlement of Novgorodsky District of Novgorod Oblast
- Rushinovo, Yaroslavl Oblast, a village in Perelessky Rural Okrug of Pereslavsky District of Yaroslavl Oblast
