= Desyatiny =

Desyatiny (Russian: Десятины) is the name of several rural localities in Russia:

- Desyatiny, Novgorod Oblast, a village in Borkovskoye Settlement of Novgorodsky District of Novgorod Oblast
- Desyatiny, Tver Oblast, a village in Staritsky District of Tver Oblast
