= Kresttsy, Krestetsky District, Novgorod Oblast =

Kresttsy Крестцы
- Urban-type settlement
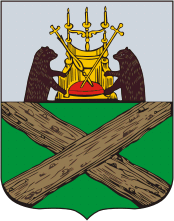
- Coat of arms
- Interactive map of Kresttsy
- Location of Kresttsy Kresttsy (Novgorod Oblast)
- Coordinates: 58°15′N 32°31′E
- Country: Russia
- Federal subject: Novgorod Oblast
- Administrative district: Krestetsky District
- First mentioned: 1393
- Urban-type settlement status since: November 9, 1938

Population (2010 Census)
  - Total: 8,717
  - Estimate (2025): 7,811 (−10.4%)

Administrative status
  - Capital of: Krestetsky District

Municipal status
  - Municipal district: Krestetsky Municipal District
  - Urban settlement: Krestetskoye Urban Settlement
  - Capital of: Krestetsky Municipal District, Krestetskoye Urban Settlement
- Time zone: UTC+3 (MSK)
- Postal code: 175461
- OKTMO ID: 49614151051

Kresttsy (Russian: Кре́стцы) is an urban locality (a work settlement) and the administrative center of Krestetsky District of Novgorod Oblast, Russia, situated on the M10 highway connecting Moscow and St. Petersburg, 86 kilometers (53 mi) east of Veliky Novgorod. Kresttsy is also located on the Kholova River. Municipally, it is incorporated as Krestetskoye Urban Settlement, the only urban settlement in the district. Population: 8,717 (2010 census); 9,963 (2002 census); 10,464 (1989 Soviet census).

== History ==
Kresttsy (Krestetsky Pogost) was first mentioned in 1393. At the time, it was a part of Derevskaya Pyatina of the Novgorod Republic. In the end of the 15th century, together with Novgorod, it became a part of the Grand Duchy of Moscow. In the course of the administrative reform carried out in 1708 by Peter the Great, the area was included into Ingermanland Governorate (known since 1710 as Saint Petersburg Governorate). In 1727, separate Novgorod Governorate was split off. In the 18th century, Kresttsy was an important trading settlement, which lied on the road connecting Moscow and Saint Petersburg. In particular, it operated a yam station which also served as a postal service station. In 1776, it was chartered and became the administrative center of Krestetsky Uyezd of Novgorod Viceroyalty. In 1796, the viceroyalty was transformed into Novgorod Governorate. Between 1796 and 1802 the uyezd was abolished, and it was re-established in 1802.

In 1851 the Saint Petersburg–Moscow railway was opened, which bypassed Kresttsy. This undermined the importance of the area, which became a backwater. In 1922, Krestetsky Uyezd was abolished, and in 1926, Kresttsy lost the town status and became a selo.

On August 1, 1927, the uyezds were abolished, and Krestetsky District was established, with the center in Kresttsy. Novgorod Governorate was abolished as well, and the district belonged to Novgorod Okrug of Leningrad Oblast. On July 23, 1930 the okrugs were abolished, and the districts became directly subordinate to the oblast. On November 9, 1938 Kresttsy was granted an urban-type settlement status. On July 5, 1944, Krestetsky District was transferred to newly established Novgorod Oblast and remained there ever since. Kresttsy was not occupied during the Second World War, though it was located close to the front line.

== Economy ==
=== Industry ===
The industry in Krestetsky district is mainly represented by timber industry enterprises. In Kresttsy, there is a factory producing traditional New Year decorations and a factory related to traditional handicrafts.

=== Transportation ===
The M10 highway which connects Moscow and Saint Petersburg runs through Kresttsy. A road connection to Malaya Vishera branches off north.

Kresstsy is connected to Valday by a railway. There is no passenger traffic, but the railway is in use for cargo traffic.

== Culture and recreation ==
Kresttsy contains seventy-nine objects classified as cultural and historical heritage of local significance. Most of these are tombs of Soviet soldiers fallen in the Second World War.

The Krestetsky District Museum is located in Kresttsy.
