= Valday, Novgorod Oblast =

Town in Novgorod Oblast, Russia

Valday Валдай
- Town
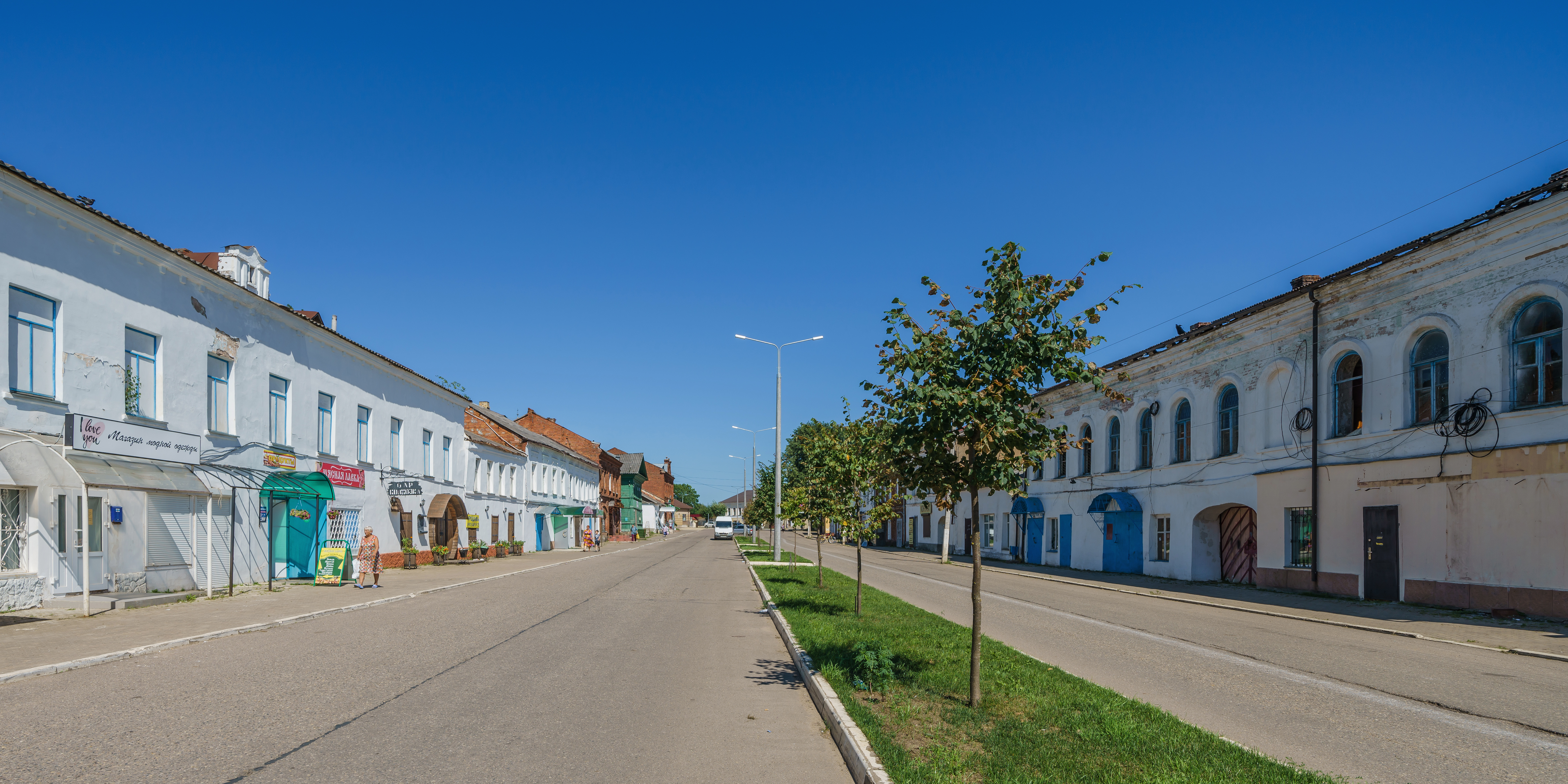
- Narodnaya Street in Valday

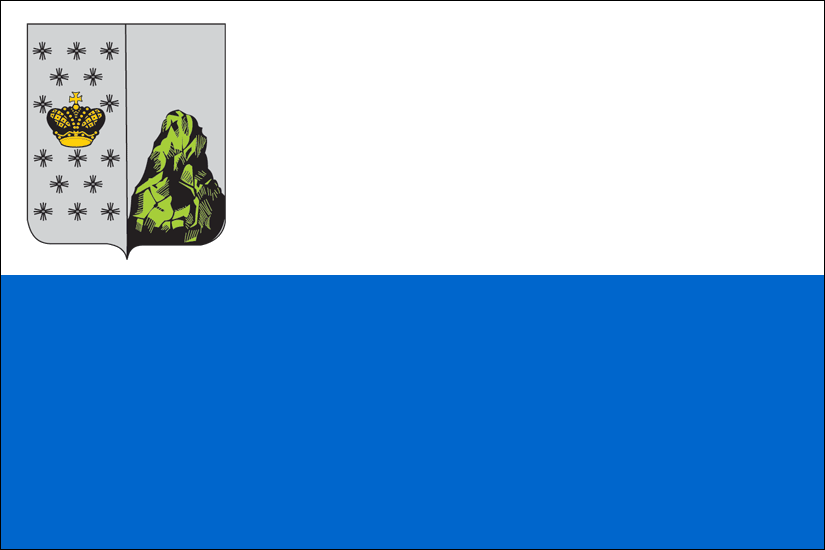
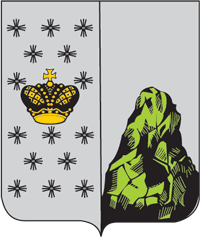
- Flag Coat of arms
- Interactive map of Valday
- Location of Valday Valday (Novgorod Oblast)
- Coordinates: 57°58′N 33°15′E
- Country: Russia
- Federal subject: Novgorod Oblast
- Administrative district: Valdaysky District
- Town of district significanceSelsoviet: Valday
- First mentioned: 1495
- Town status since: 1770
- Elevation: 210 m (690 ft)

Population (2010 Census)
  - Total: 16,098
  - Estimate (2021): 14,074 (−12.6%)

Administrative status
  - Capital of: Valdaysky District, town of district significance of Valday

Municipal status
  - Municipal district: Valdaysky Municipal District
  - Urban settlement: Valdayskoye Urban Settlement
  - Capital of: Valdaysky Municipal District, Valdayskoye Urban Settlement
- Time zone: UTC+3 (MSK)
- Postal codes: 175400, 175402–175405, 175449
- OKTMO ID: 49608101001
- Website: valday-gorod.ru

Valday (Russian: Валда́й) is a town and the administrative center of Valdaysky District in Novgorod Oblast, Russia, located on the southwestern shore of Lake Valdayskoye, the biggest one in the set of lakes in the highest region of the Valdai Hills, on the M10 Highway connecting Moscow and St. Petersburg, 386 kilometers (240 mi) from Moscow and 140 kilometers (87 mi) from Veliky Novgorod, the administrative center of the oblast. Population: 16,098 (2010 census); 18,703 (2002 census); 19,173 (1989 Soviet census).

== History ==
It was first mentioned in a chronicle in 1495. At the time, it was a part of Derevskaya Pyatina of the Novgorod Republic. The growth of Valday was facilitated by construction of a road connecting Novgorod to Central Russia and by the foundation of the Valday Iversky Monastery in 1653, which became a major cultural center. The famous monastery, built under the auspices of Patriarch Nikon in the 1650s, is located on one of the islands of Lake Valdayskoye.

In the course of the administrative reform carried out in 1708 by Peter the Great, the territory was included into Ingermanland Governorate (known since 1710 as St. Petersburg Governorate). In 1727, separate Novgorod Governorate was split off. In 1770, Valday was chartered and became the seat of Valdaysky Uyezd of Novgorod Viceroyalty. In 1796, the viceroyalty was transformed into Novgorod Governorate. Located along the road connecting Moscow and St. Petersburg, Valday developed as a major trade center. The town became the leading center of bell manufacturing in Russia. It also became a major pilgrim destination.

In August 1927, the uyezds were abolished and, effective October 1, 1927, Valdaysky District was established, with the administrative center in Valday. Novgorod Governorate was abolished as well and the district became a part of Borovichi Okrug of Leningrad Oblast. On July 23, 1930, the okrugs were abolished and the districts were directly subordinated to the oblast. Valday was close to the eastern front line for Russia during World War II, but was never occupied by German troops. On July 5, 1944, Valdaysky District was transferred to newly established Novgorod Oblast and remained there ever since.

== Administrative and municipal status ==
Within the framework of administrative divisions, Valday serves as the administrative center of Valdaysky District. As an administrative division, it is, together with the selo of Zimogorye, incorporated within Valdaysky District as the town of district significance of Valday. As a municipal division, the town of district significance of Valday is incorporated within Valdaysky Municipal District as Valdayskoye Urban Settlement.

== Economy ==
=== Industry ===
In Valday, there are enterprises of timber and food industries, as well as enterprises producing optical devices and pumps.

=== Transportation ===
A railway which connects Bologoye and Pskov via Staraya Russa passes through Valday. The town also has a railway connection with Kresttsy. There is no passenger traffic but the railway is in use for cargo traffic.

Valday is located on the M10 Highway which connects Moscow and St. Petersburg. There is a road connection to Okulovka, as well as local roads.

== Culture and tourism ==
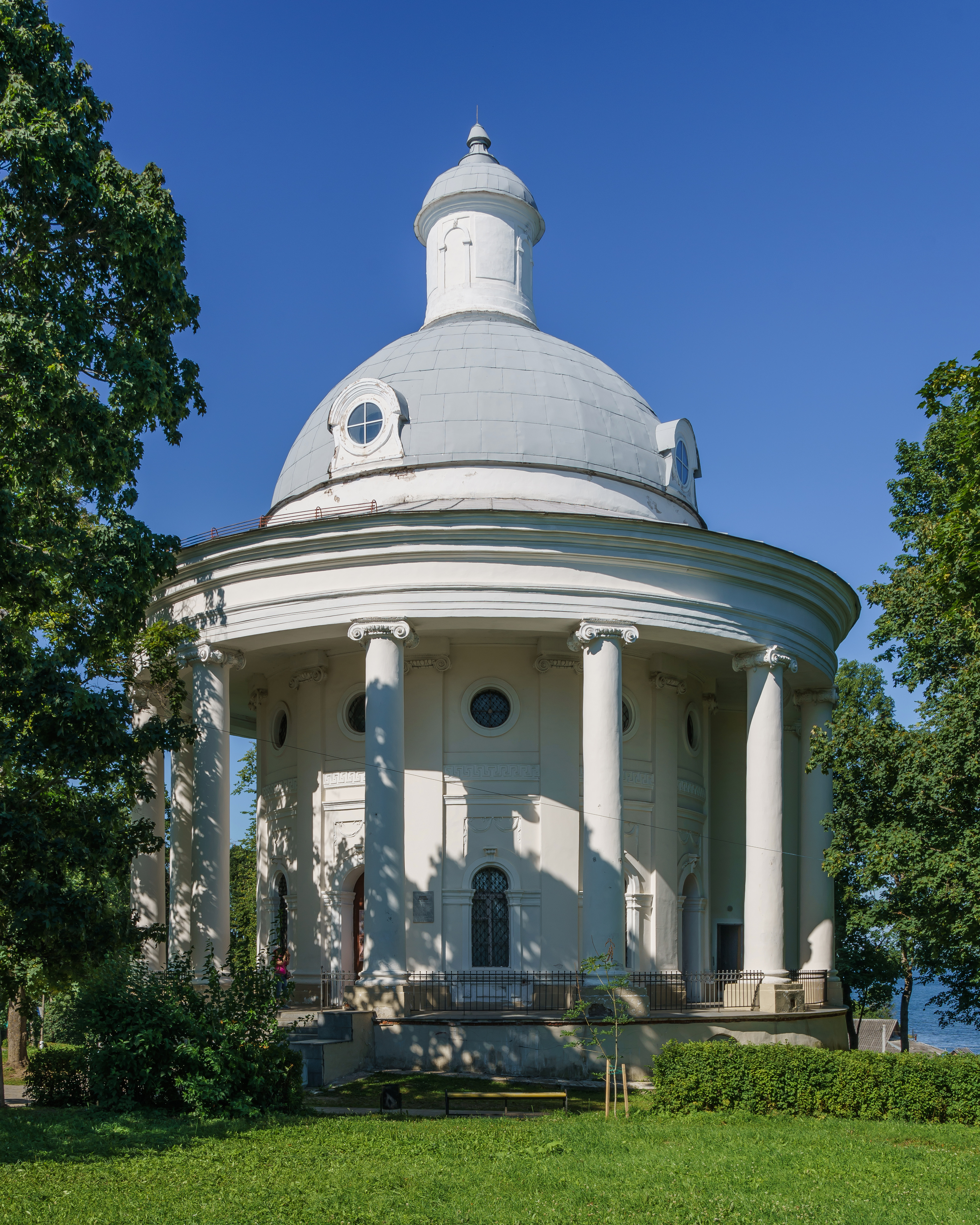
The church of St. Catherine (1790s, attributed to Nikolay Lvov)

Valday is a popular tourist destination, situated in the middle of the Valdaysky National Park, in the northern part of the Valdai Hills. Most tourists visit the lake and the town during the summer. Valday features many recreation facilities and sanatoria, with many camping places available around the lake. The first meeting of the Valdai Discussion Club was also held on the lake.

Valday contains forty-three cultural heritage monuments of federal significance and additionally seventy-four objects classified as cultural and historical heritage of local significance. The federal monuments are the ensemble of Valday Iversky Monastery, the Presentation Church, and a park.

The Valdaysky District Museum, located in Valday, displays two exhibitions. One is devoted to the history of Valday as an uyezd seat in the 19th century. This part of the museum is located in the Mikhaylova House, a 19th-century historical building. The second part, in the former Church of St Katherine, the Great Martyr, highlights the history of Valday bell-making. In the end of the 18th and in the 19th century, bell-making was a traditional handicraft in Valday. Big church bells, as well as small bells which were hung to a horse harness, were produced.

== Gallery ==
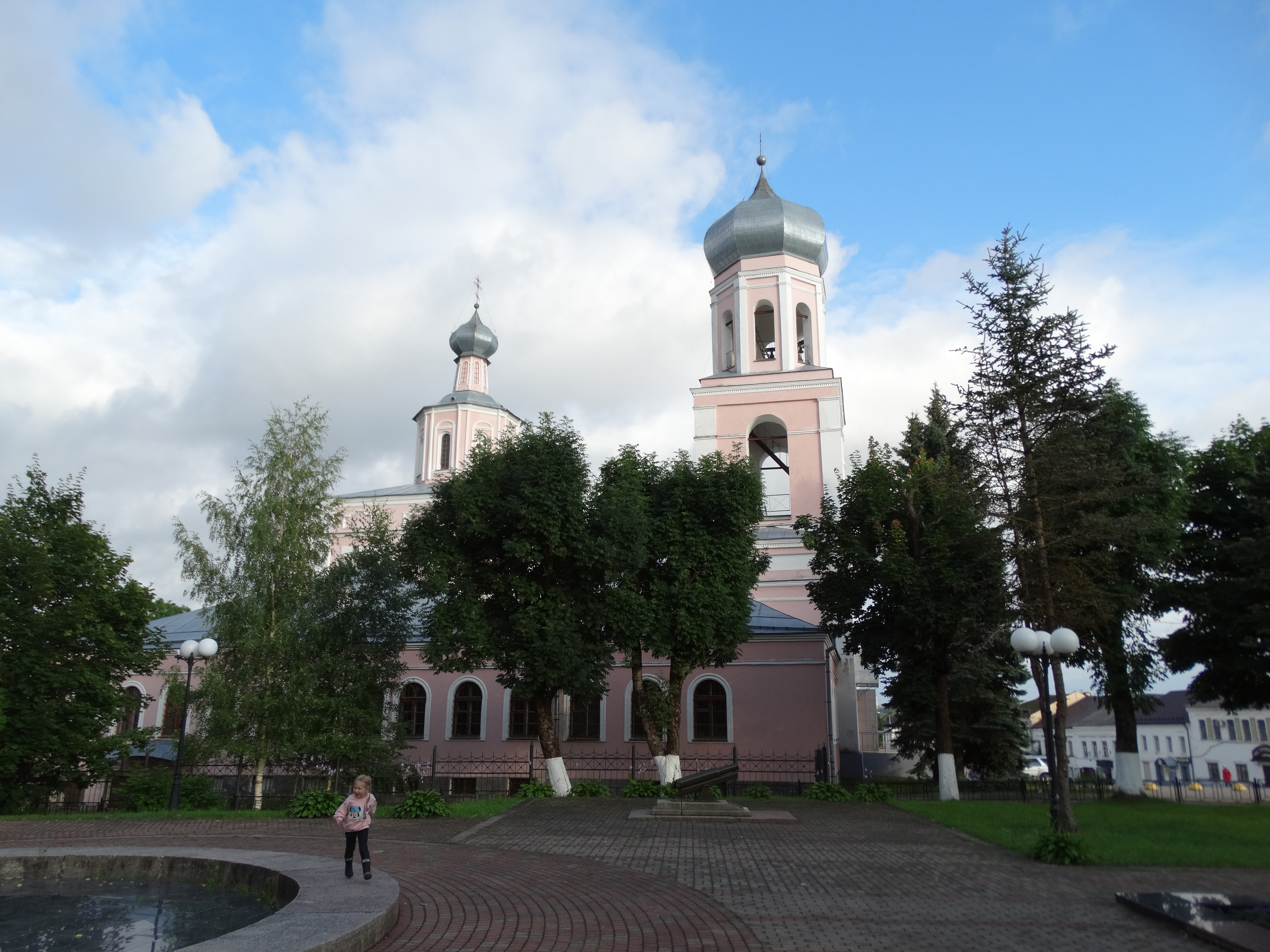
Troitsky Cathedral

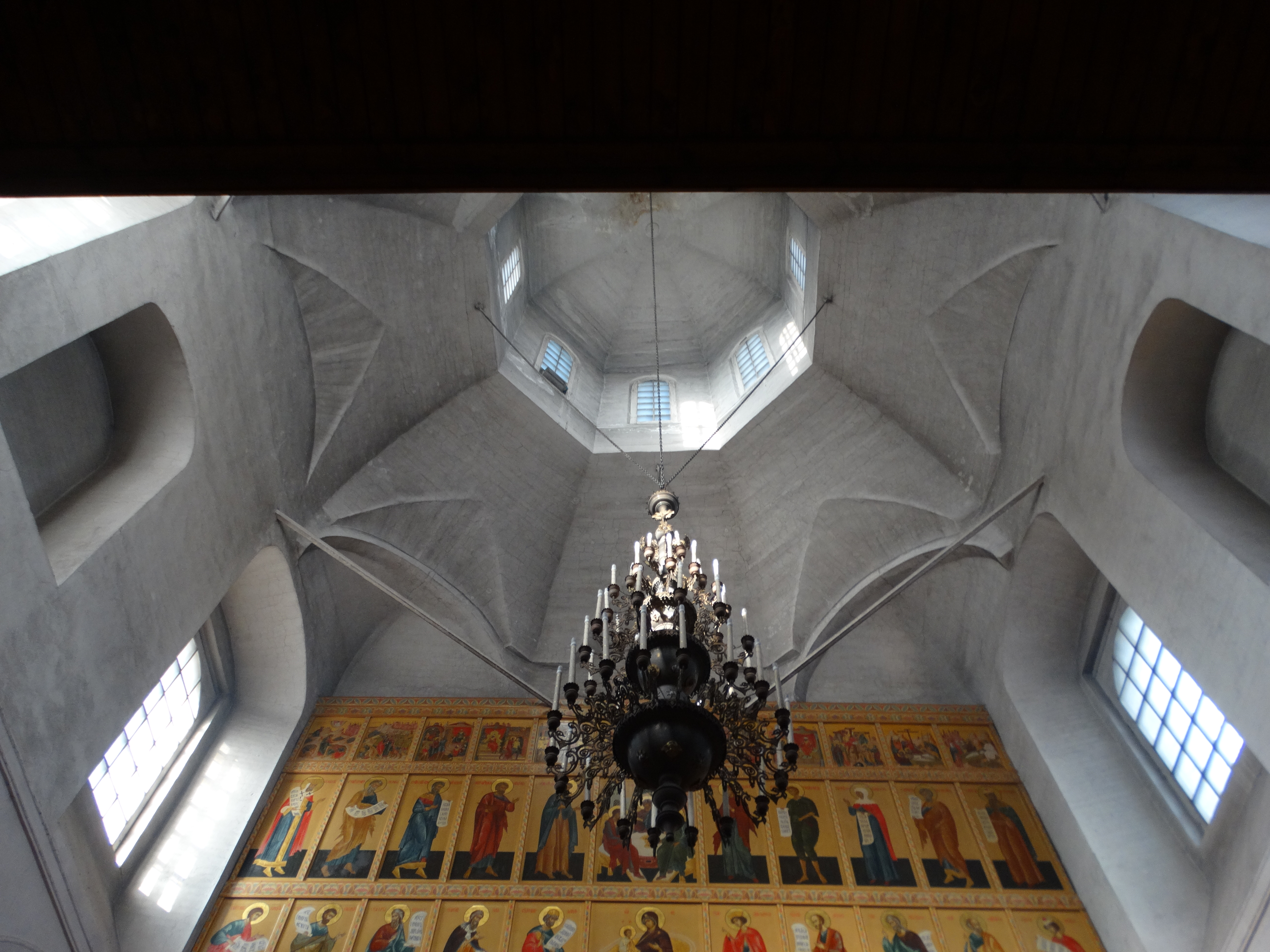
Troitsky Cathedral, Inner view

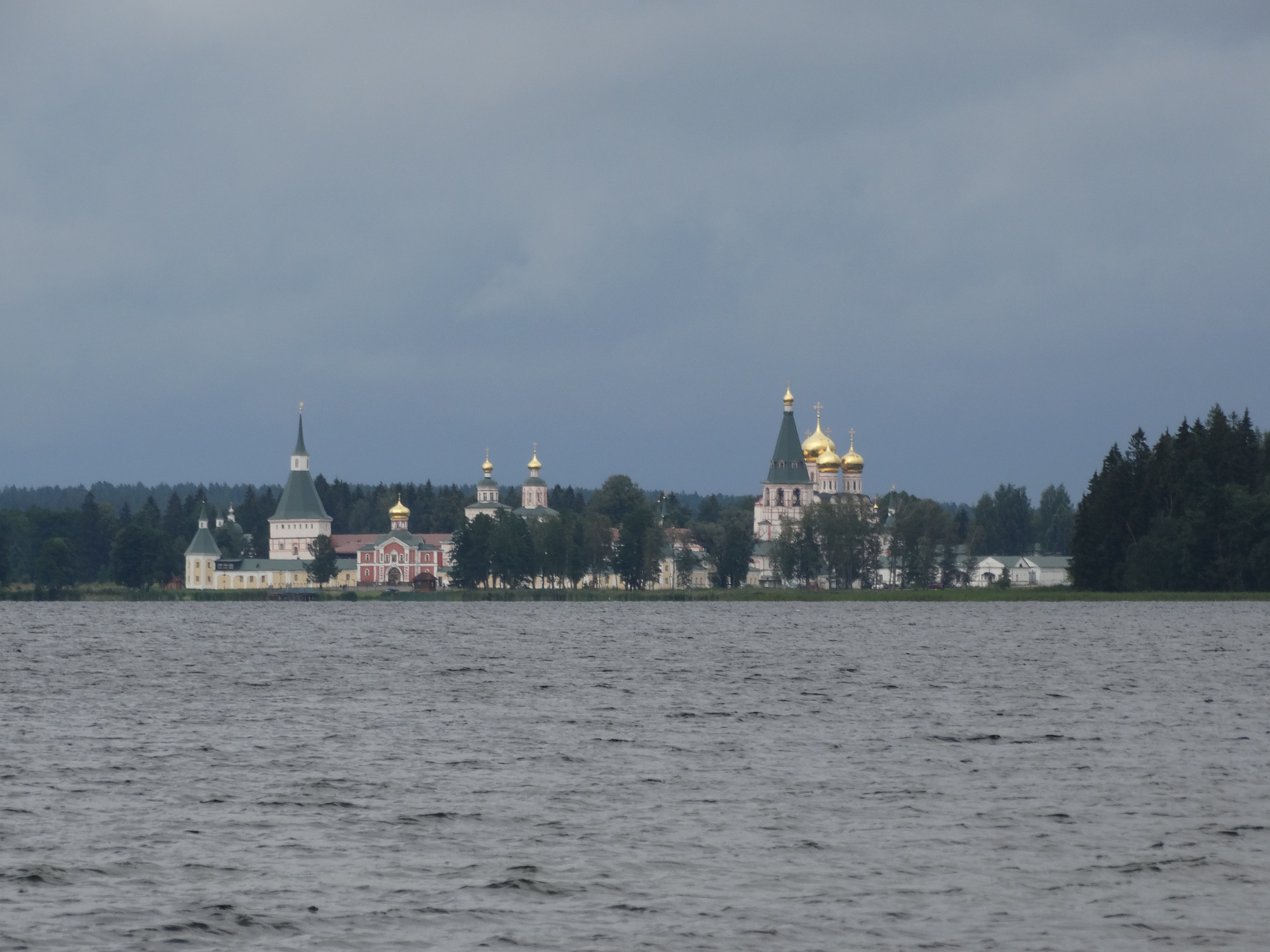
Iversky Monastery

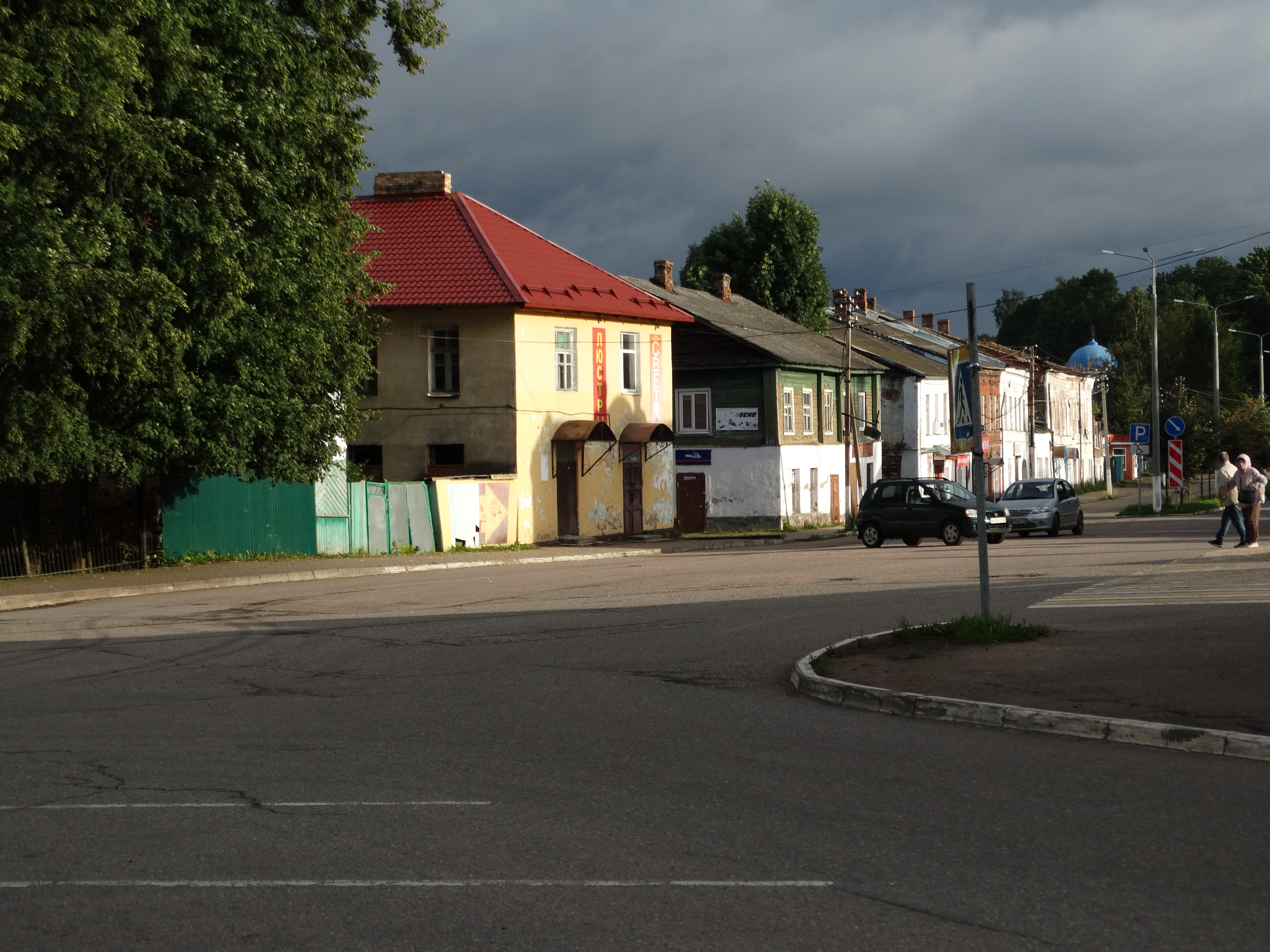
Houses in the old city

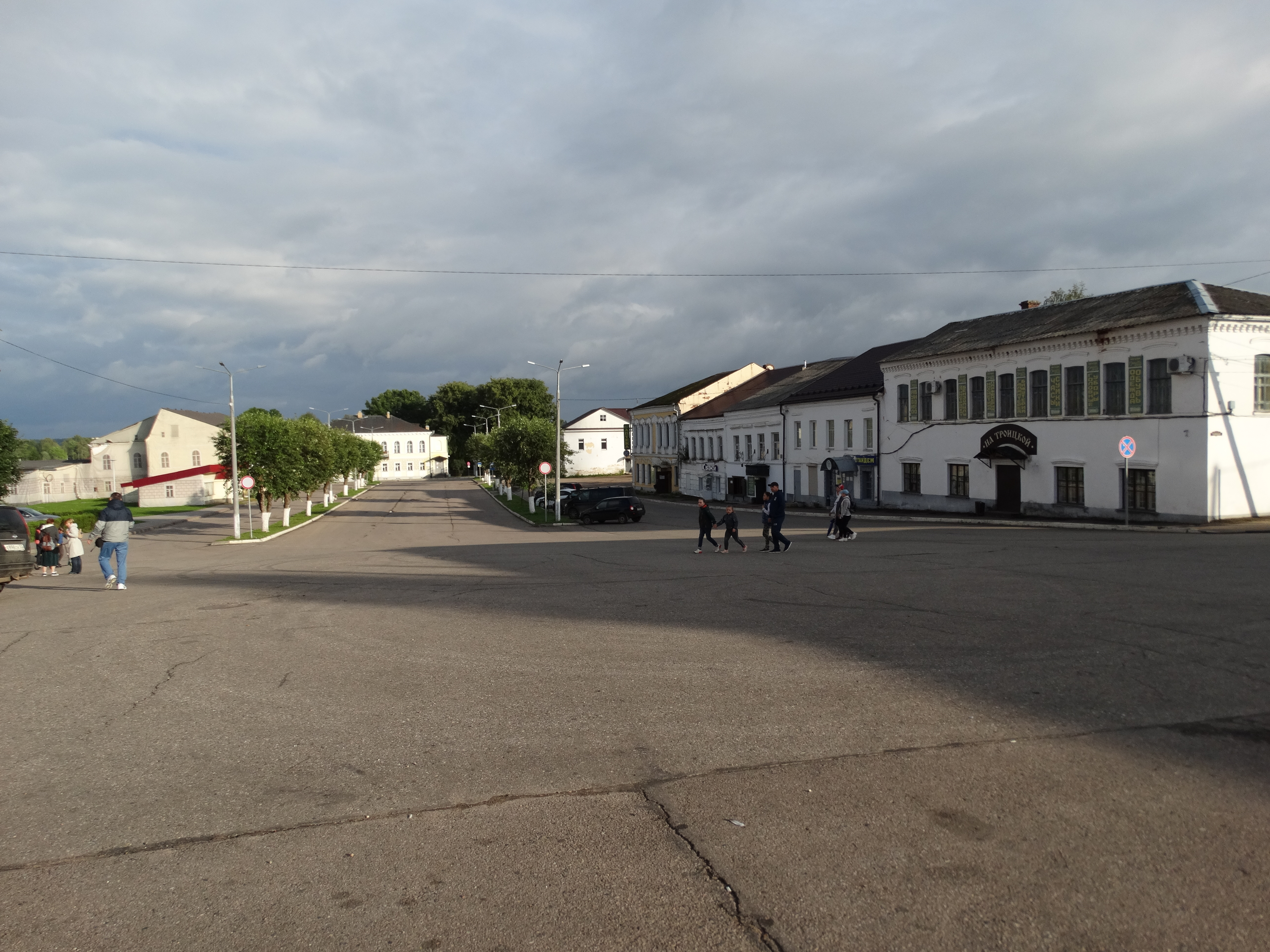
On the main square

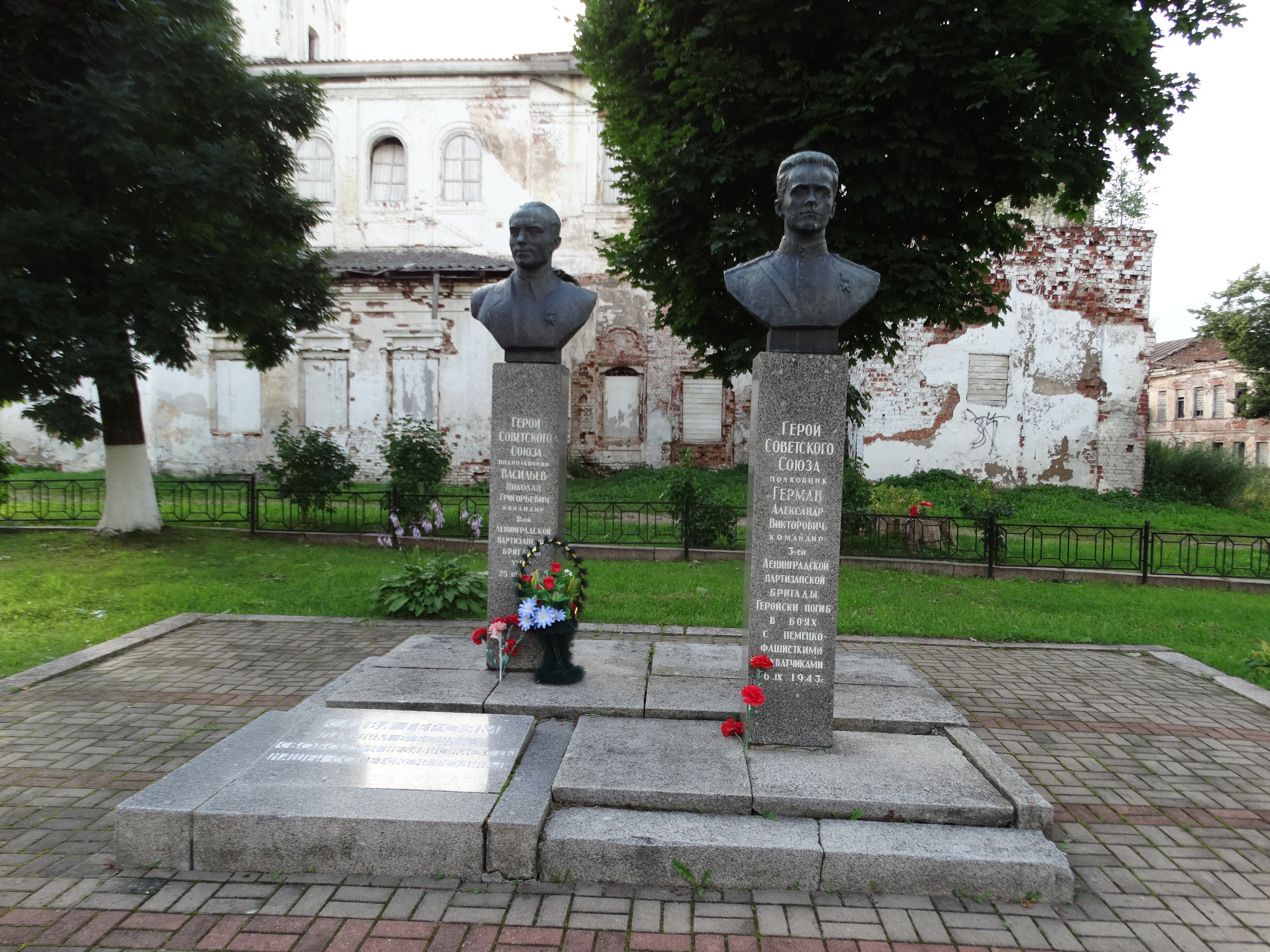
Monuments to Valdai Heroes of the Soviet Union

== Residence of the President of Russia ==
Very close to the town on the coast of Lake Valdayskoye there is a residence of the President of Russia. The complex of buildings is highly secured and a large sector of the lake is closed for boats and swimmers. This place was frequented by President Boris Yeltsin and is also Vladimir Putin's favorite. Putin's Dacha is on the southern 100 hectares (250 acres) of a peninsula between Lake Uzhin (Russian: Ужин) and Lake Valdai (Russian: озеро Валдай) and is across Lake Valdai from Valday (Russian: Валдай). Often, Putin's Dacha, which was built in 1980, is called Valdai, Dolgie Bearods, or Stalin's Dacha, but Stalin was not alive when Valdai was built. Abutting north of this location is 150 hectares (370 acres) owned by the Russian Federation and is frequented by the Federal Security Service. According to Alexei Navalny, Yuri Kovalchuk is the owner of Putin's Dacha.

== Twin towns – sister cities ==
- Cañon City, United States
