= Olonetsky Uyezd =

1801 establishment in the Russian Empire

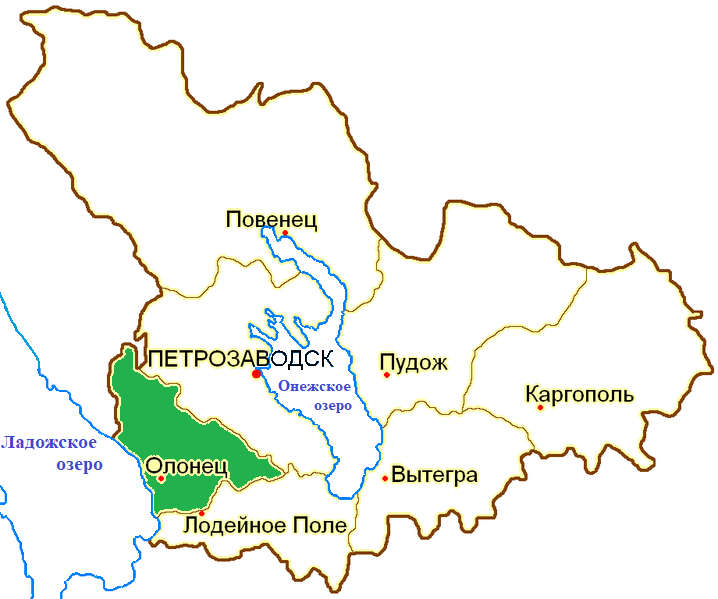
Olonetsky district of Olonets Governorate

Olonetsky Uyezd (Russian: Олонецкий уезд) was one of the seven subdivisions of the Olonets Governorate of the Russian Empire. Its capital was Olonets. Olonetsky Uyezd was located in the western part of the governorate (in the southern part of the present-day Republic of Karelia and in the northeastern part of Leningrad Oblast). In terms of present-day administrative borders, the territory of Olonetsky Uyezd is divided between the Olonetsky and Pryazhinsky districts of the Republic of Karelia and Podporozhsky District of Leningrad Oblast.

== Demographics ==
At the time of the Russian Empire Census of 1897, Olonetsky Uyezd had a population of 39,990. Of these, 71.3% spoke Karelian, 27.0% Russian, 1.5% Finnish and 0.1% Polish as their native language.
