= Khuba =

Khuba is a surname. Notable people with the surname include:

- Bhagwanth Khuba
- Mallikarjun Khuba
