= Belozersky Uyezd =

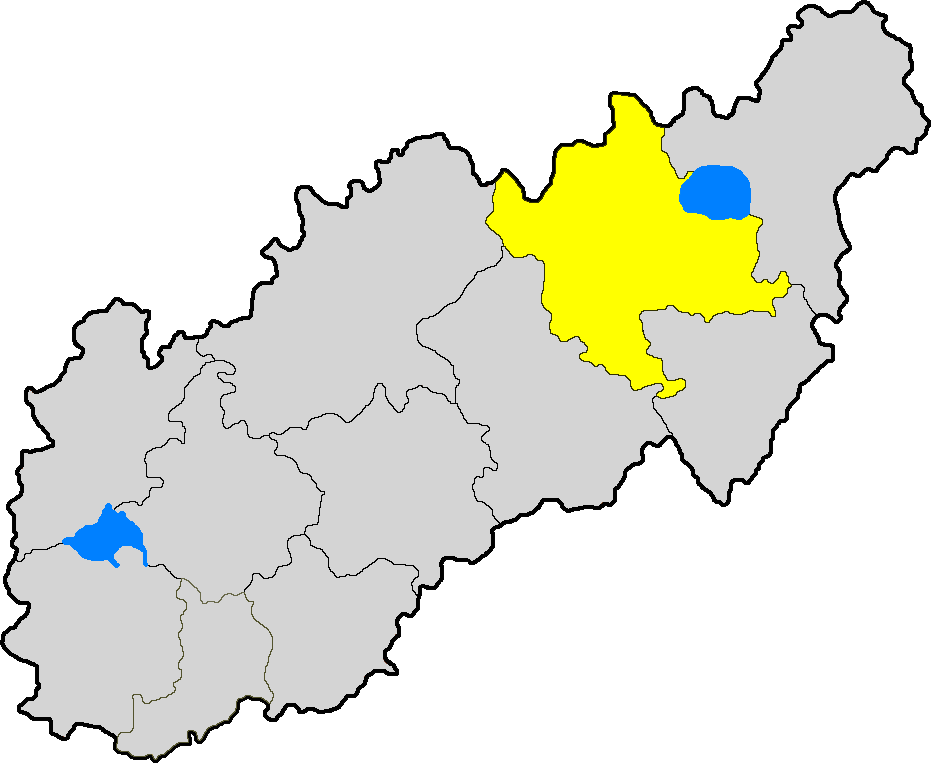
Belozyorsky uyezd

Belozersky Uyezd (Белозерский уезд) was one of the eleven subdivisions of the Novgorod Governorate of the Russian Empire. It was situated in the northeastern part of the governorate (in the western part of present-day Vologda Oblast and the eastern part of Leningrad Oblast). The seat of the uyezd was Belozersk.

== Demographics ==
At the time of the Russian Empire Census of 1897, Belozersky Uyezd had a population of 86,906. Of these, 96.8% spoke Russian, 2.3% Veps, 0.7% Karelian and 0.1% Yiddish as their native language.
