= Kirillovsky Uyezd =

Kirillovsky Uyezd (Кирилловский уезд) was one of the subdivisions of the Novgorod Governorate of the Russian Empire. It was situated in the northeastern part of the governorate. Its administrative centre was Kirillov.

== Demographics ==
At the time of the Russian Empire Census of 1897, Kirillovsky Uyezd had a population of 120,004. Of these, 99.8% spoke Russian and 0.1% Finnish as their native language.
