= Ustyuzhensky Uyezd =

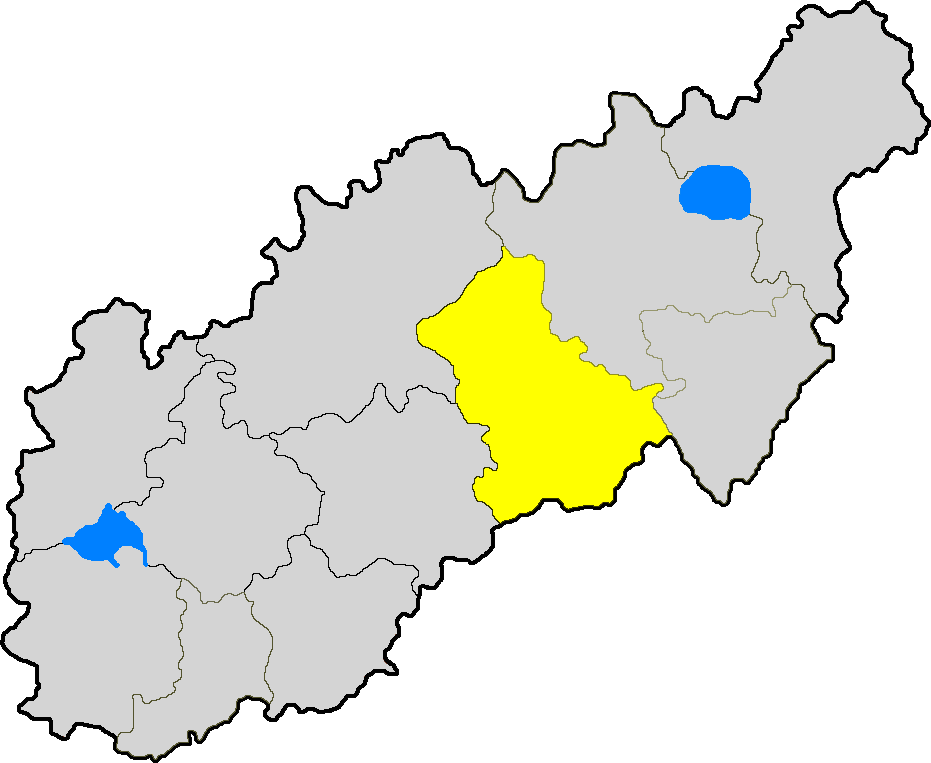

Ustyuzhensky Uyezd (Устюженский уезд) was one of the subdivisions of the Novgorod Governorate of the Russian Empire. It was situated in the northeastern part of the governorate. Its administrative centre was Ustyuzhna. In terms of present-day administrative borders, the territory of Ustyuzhensky Uyezd is divided between the Babayevsky, Chagodoshchensky, Cherepovetsky, Kaduysky and Ustyuzhensky districts of Vologda Oblast, the Khvoyninsky, Moshenskoy and Pestovsky districts of Novgorod Oblast, the Lesnoy and Sandovsky districts of Tver Oblast and Boksitogorsky District of Leningrad Oblast.

== Demographics ==
At the time of the Russian Empire Census of 1897, Ustyuzhensky Uyezd had a population of 99,737. Of these, 99.6% spoke Russian, 0.1% German, 0.1% Estonian and 0.1% Karelian as their native language.
