= Cherepovetsky Uyezd =

Cherepovetsky Uyezd (Череповецкий уезд) was one of the subdivisions of the Novgorod Governorate of the Russian Empire. It was situated in the northeastern part of the governorate. Its administrative centre was Cherepovets.

== Demographics ==
At the time of the Russian Empire Census of 1897, Cherepovetsky Uyezd had a population of 157,495. Of these, 99.9% spoke Russian as their native language.
