= M10 highway (Russia) =

Federal highway in Russia

Federal Highway M10
- Федеральная автомобильная дорога М10

Route information
- Part of E18 E105

- Part of AH8
- Length: 872 km (542 mi)

Major junctions
- South end: MKAD in Moscow

- North end: A 118 in Saint Petersburg

Location
- Country: Russia

Highway system
- Russian Federal Highways
| ← M 9 | → M 11 |

The M10 "Russia" (Russian: "Россия") is a federal highway in Russia connecting the country's two largest cities, Moscow and Saint Petersburg. Other than in the vicinity of Moscow and Saint Petersburg, the M10 is basically a two-lane highway (one lane for each direction), with an occasional third centre lane to allow overtaking or for left-turning traffic at intersections.

== History ==
The highway Moscow - Tver - Novgorod existed even before the founding of Saint Petersburg. Along the way there were special checkpoints (Yam) in particular Yedrovo, Valday, Yazhelbitsy, Krestsy, and Bronnitsa. The first 778 kilometres (483 mi) long road in this area was built between 1712 and 1746, by order of Peter the Great.

The construction of this road was run by an office that formed for this purpose. After the completion of the road in 1755, it was transformed into the Office of the structure of public roads. It was later known as the Commission on the Roads in the State.

== Route ==
=== Moscow to Saint Petersburg ===
The distance from Moscow to St. Petersburg by M10 is approximately 700 km.

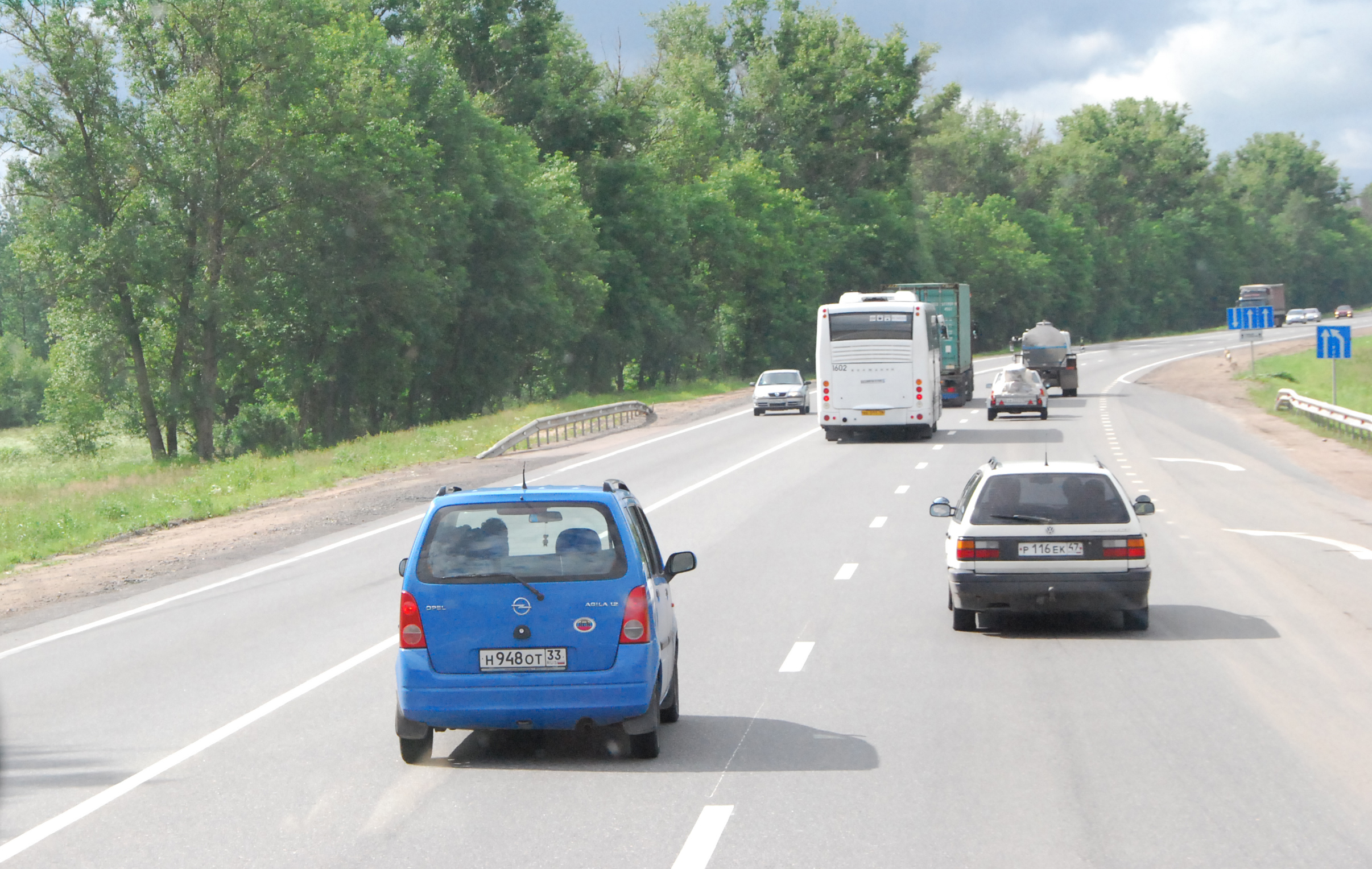
The M10 near Novgorod

The route runs through or near the cities and settlements of Khimki, Zelenograd, Solnechnogorsk, Klin, Tver, Torzhok, Vyshny Volochyok, Valdai, Kresttsy, Veliky Novgorod, Chudovo, Tosno and reaches the city border of Saint Petersburg in Pushkinsky District. It is known as "Russia" (Russian: Россия) highway and is part of European route E105.

In Moscow, the Leningrad Highway (Russian: Ленинградское шоссе), begins from a junction of Leningradsky Prospekt avenue with the Volokolamsk Highway To the Moscow centre, the avenue continues into 1st Tverskaya-Yamskaya Street and then Tverskaya Street to Manege Square in the heart of the city.

The 'unofficial' end of the highway is since the Tsars' era commonly considered to be the Central Post Office of Saint Petersburg (Russian: Главпочтамт). Actually the Moscow Highway begins from the Victory Square in Moskovsky raion in the southern part of the city and Moskovsky Prospekt avenue which begins in the city centre on Sennaya Square, connects the highway with the centre of Saint Petersburg.

The 4 lane toll road parallel to M10 was finished in November 2019. Most parts were opened in November 2019.

=== Saint Petersburg to the border with Finland ===
From Saint Petersburg city centre to the Finnish border the distance is approximately 210 km. The route section between Saint Petersburg, and the border with Finland is known as the "Scandinavia" (Russian: Скандинавия) highway and has officially been renamed to route A181. The designation M10 stayed valid until December 2017. This section is a part of the European route E18. News about the plans to expand this route section to a motorway with three lanes in each direction came out in August 2011.

=== Characteristics ===
The temperature range is almost unchanged: the annual average temperature throughout the section of the road may vary between 2 and 4 °C. The average temperature in January is -11 °C. In July it is +19 °C.

The road crosses the river Sister (a tributary of the Dubna, near Klin), Volga (in Tver), Msta (near Novoselitsy), Volkhov (at Krechevitsy), etc. Bridges longer than 50 meters have a capacity of 60–80 tons. In Tver region (127 km, 132 miles), there are bridges with carrying capacity of 40 tons.

The road has from 2 to 10 lanes, mostly 2 in both directions. The width of the carriageway on the main stretch of road is 8–11 meters. The speed ranges between 30 km/h at repair and detours, to 90 km/h. However, on a segment on the territory of Moscow and Moscow region, the regular flow (traffic) rate exceeds the allowable limit by 30–50 km/h. In general, the M-10 is considered full of accidents and stressful. There is a large flow of freight transport.

== Links ==
The scandinavia highway
