= Malaya Vishera =

Town in Novgorod Oblast, Russia

Malaya Vishera Малая Вишера
- Town
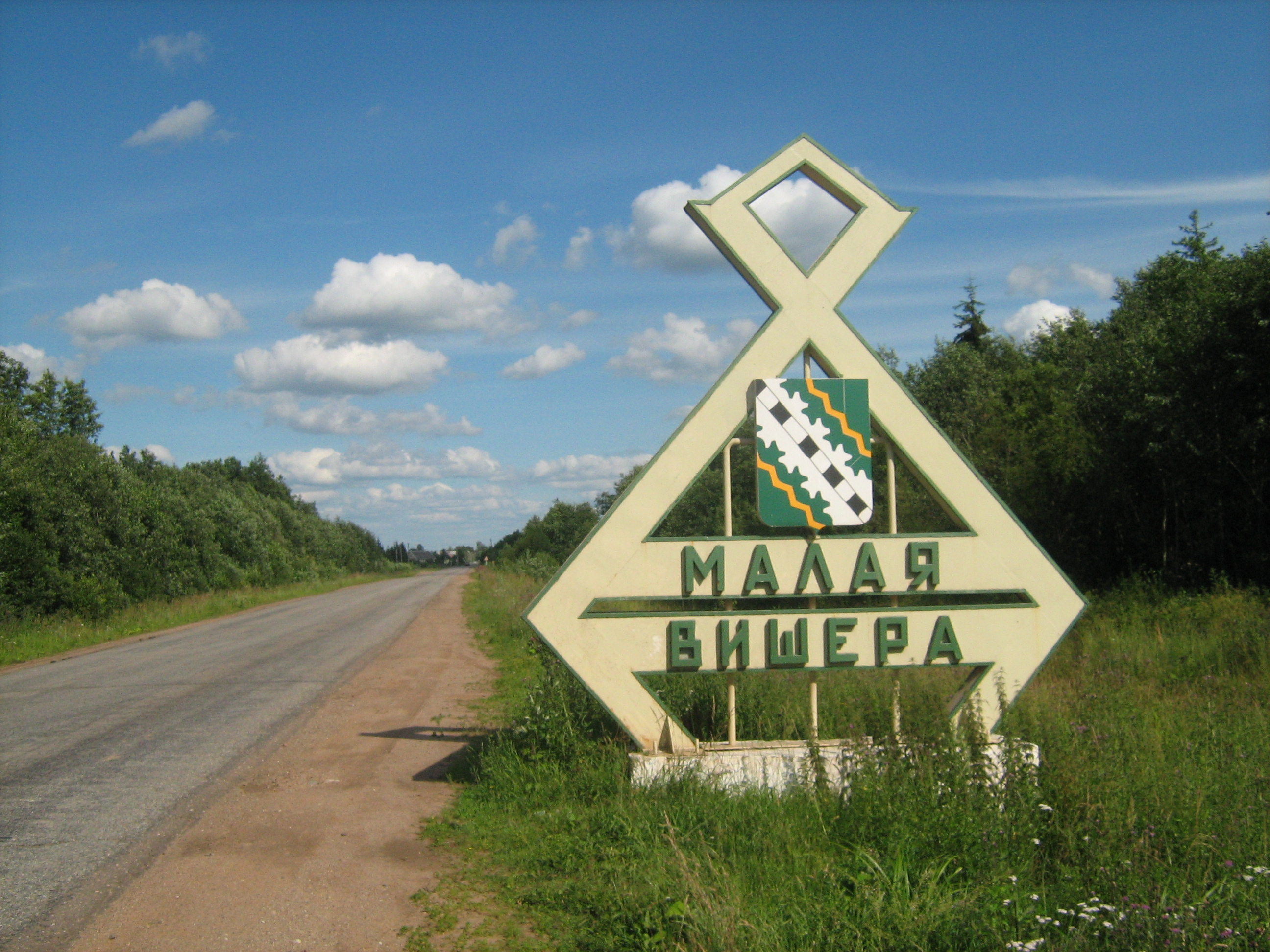
- Welcome sign at the entrance to Malaya Vishera

- Coat of arms
- Interactive map of Malaya Vishera
- Location of Malaya Vishera Malaya Vishera (Novgorod Oblast)
- Coordinates: 58°51′N 32°14′E
- Country: Russia
- Federal subject: Novgorod Oblast
- Administrative district: Malovishersky District
- Town of district significanceSelsoviet: Malaya Vishera
- Founded: 1843
- Town status since: 1921
- Elevation: 65 m (213 ft)

Population (2010 Census)
  - Total: 12,461
  - Estimate (2021): 9,996 (−19.8%)

Administrative status
  - Capital of: Malovishersky District, town of district significance of Malaya Vishera

Municipal status
  - Municipal district: Malovishersky Municipal District
  - Urban settlement: Malovisherskoye Urban Settlement
  - Capital of: Malovishersky Municipal District, Malovisherskoye Urban Settlement
- Time zone: UTC+3 (MSK)
- Postal codes: 174260, 174262
- OKTMO ID: 49620101001

Malaya Vishera (Russian: Ма́лая Ви́шера) is a town and the administrative center of Malovishersky District in Novgorod Oblast, Russia. Population: 12,461 (2010 census); 14,182 (2002 census); 15,647 (1989 Soviet census).

== History ==
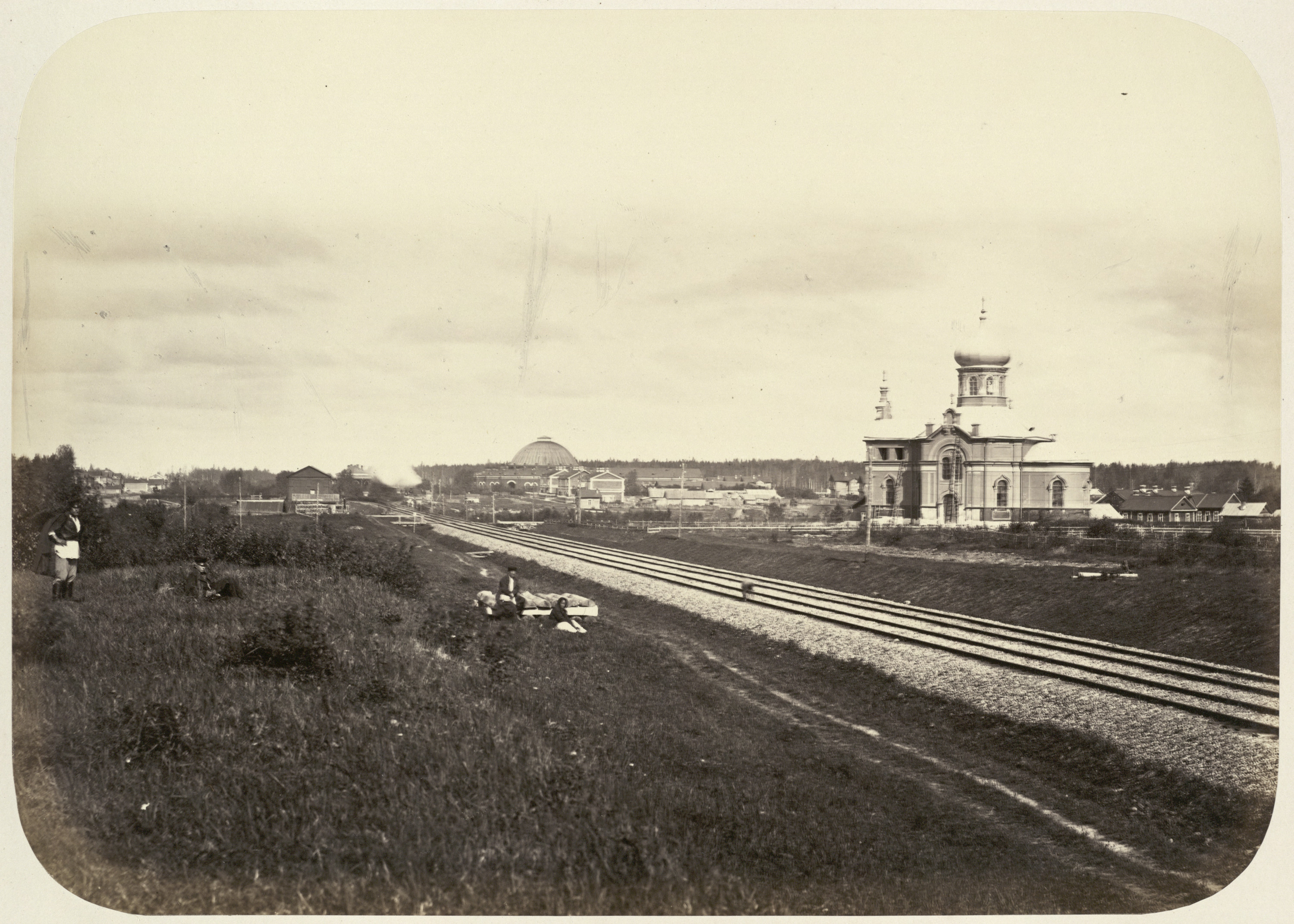
Malaya Vishera in the 1860s

The name of the town originates from the Malaya Vishera River, a tributary of the Vishera River. It was founded in 1843, as the construction of the Moscow–St. Petersburg Railway (opened in 1851) passing through the modern town started. At the time, it was a part of Krestetsky Uyezd of Novgorod Governorate. On February 24, 1918, Malovishersky Uyezd was established and Malaya Vishera became its seat. In 1921, Malaya Vishera was granted town status.

In August 1927, the uyezds were abolished and, effective October 1, 1927, Malovishersky District was established, with the administrative center in Malaya Vishera. Novgorod Governorate was abolished as well and the district became a part of Novgorod Okrug of Leningrad Oblast. On July 23, 1930, the okrugs were abolished and the districts were directly subordinated to the oblast.

During World War II, Malaya Vishera was under German occupation from 24 October 1941 until 20 November 1941. It became the eighth Soviet town liberated by Soviet troops in 1941 and the first one among those which were not subsequently re-occupied.

On July 5, 1944, Malovishersky District was included into the newly established Novgorod Oblast and remained there ever since.

== Administrative and municipal status ==
Within the framework of administrative divisions, Malaya Vishera serves as the administrative center of Malovishersky District. As an administrative division, it is, together with seven rural localities, incorporated within Malovishersky District as the town of district significance of Malaya Vishera. As a municipal division, the town of district significance of Malaya Vishera is incorporated within Malovishersky Municipal District as Malovisherskoye Urban Settlement.

== Economy ==
=== Industry ===
In the past, the economy of Malaya Vishera was dependent on the glass-making factory, which started to experience serious difficulties in the 1990s–2000s. Currently, it relies on timber industry (including production of furniture), food industry, and production of instruments.

=== Transportation ===
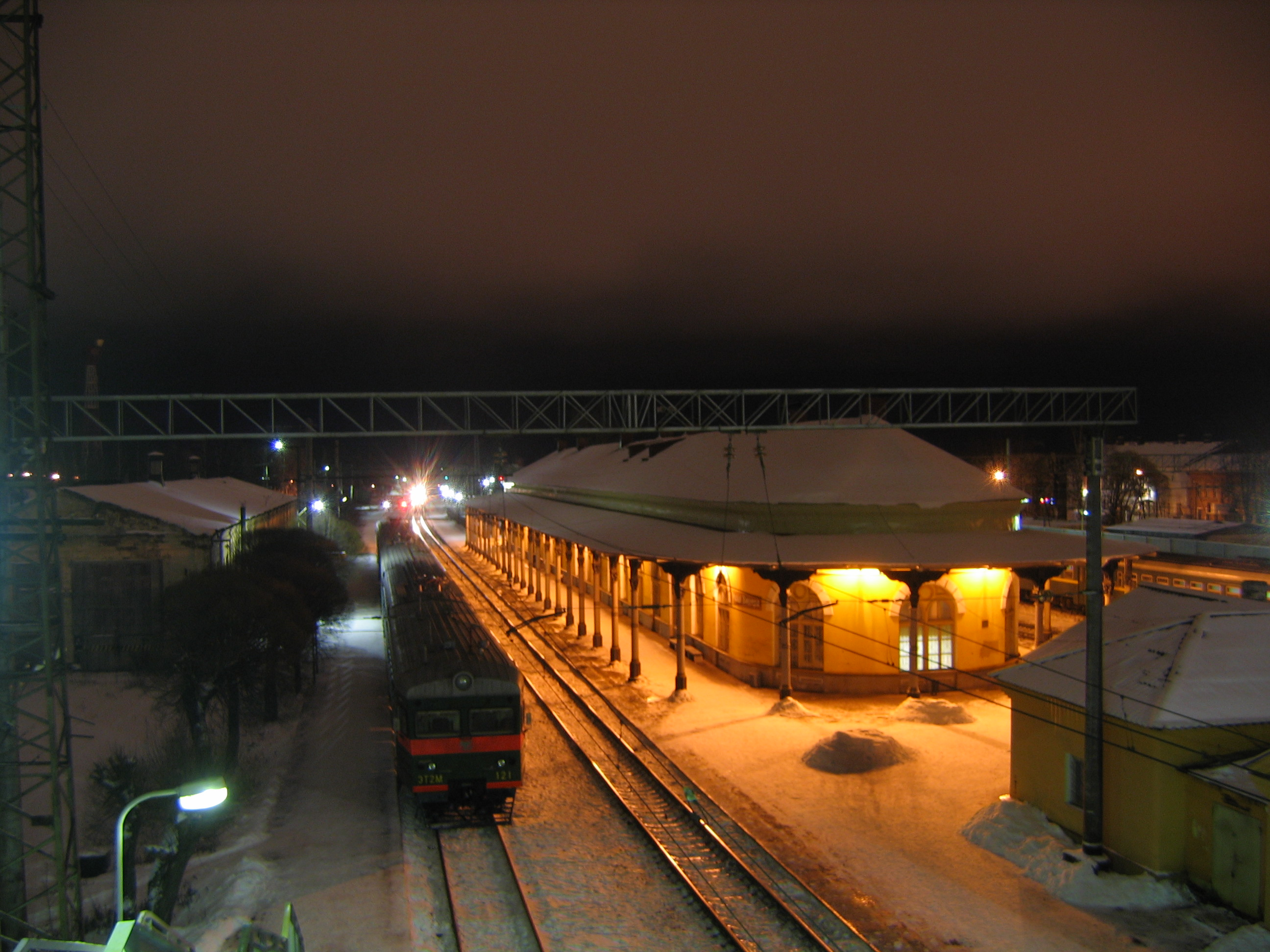
Malaya Vishera railway station

A train depot was opened in Malaya Vishera in 1860. Many long-distance trains (including Moscow–St. Petersburg) stop at this station. The station is also an important terminus of the regional suburban trains from Okulovka, Volkhovstroy, and St. Petersburg.

Malaya Vishera is connected by roads with the M10 Highway and with Lyubytino. The M10 passes 40 kilometers (25 mi) west of the town.

== Culture and recreation ==
Malaya Vishera contains eight objects protected as cultural and historical heritage of local significance.

Malaya Vishera hosts the Malaya Vishera District Museum, the only museum in the district. The museum exhibits collections of local interest.
