= Borovichsky Uyezd =

Borovichsky Uyezd (Боровичский уезд) was one of the subdivisions of the Novgorod Governorate of the Russian Empire. It was situated in the southcentral part of the governorate. Its administrative centre was Borovichi.

== Demographics ==
At the time of the Russian Empire Census of 1897, Borovichsky Uyezd had a population of 146,368. Of these, 98.4% spoke Russian, 0.7% Karelian, 0.2% German, 0.1% Polish, 0.1% Yiddish, 0.1% Estonian and 0.1% Latvian as their native language.
