= Novgorodsky Uyezd =

Novgorodsky Uyezd (Новгородский уезд) was one of the subdivisions of the Novgorod Governorate of the Russian Empire. It was situated in the southwestern part of the governorate. Its administrative centre was Veliky Novgorod.

== Demographics ==
At the time of the Russian Empire Census of 1897, Novgorodsky Uyezd had a population of 185,757. Of these, 92.6% spoke Russian, 2.4% Latvian, 1.4% German, 1.1% Yiddish, 1.1% Polish, 0.4% Estonian, 0.4% Lithuanian, 0.2% Belarusian, 0.2% Finnish, 0.1% Tatar, 0.1% Ukrainian and 0.1% Karelian as their native language.
