= Novgorod Governorate =

1727–1927 unit of Russia

Coordinates: 58°26′N 32°23′E

Novgorod Governorate Новгородская губерния
- Governorate of the Russian Empire (1727–1917), Russian Republic, and Russian SFSR (1917–1927)
- 1727–1927
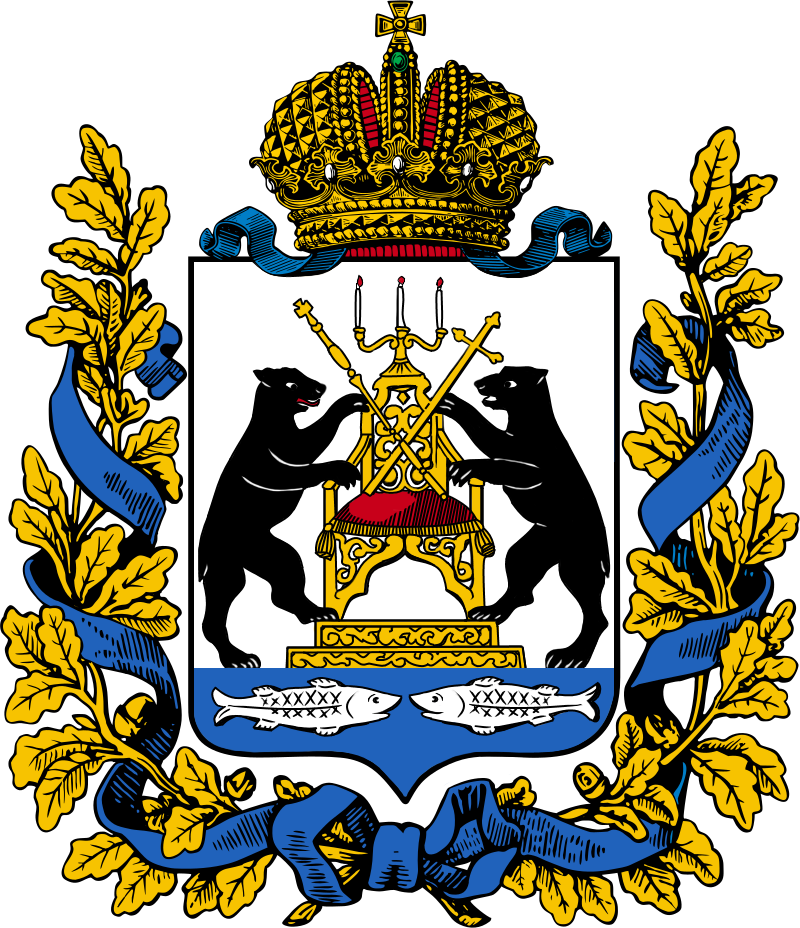
- Coat of arms

- Location in the Russian Empire
- Capital: Novgorod
- Area
- 118,544.4 km^{2} (45,770.2 sq mi)
- Population
  - 1897: 1,367,022
- History
  - Established: 1727
  - became part of Leningrad Oblast: 1 August 1927
Preceded by	Succeeded by
Saint Petersburg Governorate	Leningrad Oblast

Novgorod Governorate (Note: Russian: Новгородская губерния, pre-1918 orthography: Новгоро́дская губе́рнія, romanized: Novgorodskaya guberniya; Russian pronunciation: [ˈnofɡərətskəjə ɡʊˈbʲernʲɪjə]) was an administrative-territorial unit (guberniya) of the Russian Empire and the Russian SFSR, which existed from 1727 to 1776 and from 1796 to 1927. Its administrative center was in the city of Novgorod. The governorate was located in the northwest of the European part of the Russian Empire.

== History ==
The governorate was established in 1727 from Belozersk, Novgorod, Pskov, Tver and Velikiye Luki Provinces of St. Petersburg Governorate. It was abolished by a decree (ukase) of Catherine II on September 5 [O.S. August 24], 1776, which established Novgorod and Tver Viceroyalties instead. Novgorod Viceroyalty included Novgorod and Olonets Oblast, whereas Tver Viceroyalty was made of the former Tver Province. The viceroyalty was never formally abolished, however, after a number of administrative transformations it was divided into what was later to become Olonets Governorate, and into Novgorod Viceroyalty proper. After 1796, Novgorod Viceroyalty was mentioned in official documents only as Novgorod Governorate. This second Novgorod Governorate existed until 1927, when its territory was included into Leningrad Oblast.

In terms of the modern political division of Russia, Novgorod Governorate as of 1727 comprised the areas of what is currently Novgorod Oblast and Pskov Oblast, the greater parts of the Republic of Karelia, as well as parts of Arkhangelsk, Vologda, Leningrad, and Tver Oblasts. In 1927, it only comprised a larger part of current Novgorod Oblast and a small part of Tver Oblast.

== Administrative divisions ==
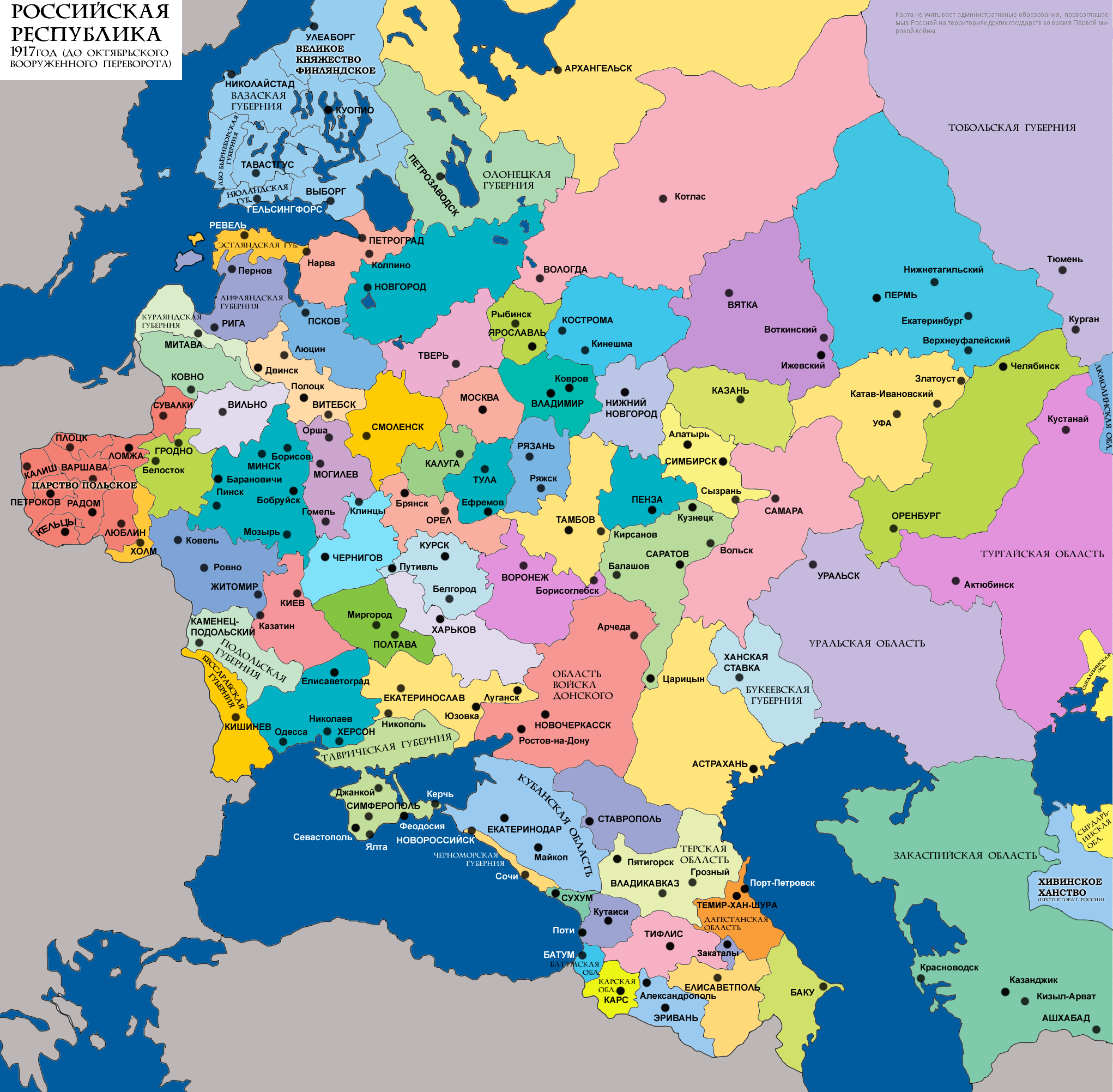
The European part of the Russian Republic in 1917. Novgorod Governorate is shown as the teal area in the top part of the map.

In 1727, the description of Novgorod Governorate's borders was not given. Instead, the territory was defined as a set of cities and the lands adjacent to those cities. The cities were

- Novgorod Province: Olonets, Porkhov, Novaya Ladoga, Staraya Ladoga, Staraya Russa, and Tikhvin;
- Pskov Province: Pskov, Velye, Izborsk, Gdov, Ostrov, Vybor, Volodimer, Dubkov, Opochka, Krasny, Voronech, Rzheva Pustaya, and Kobylye Gorodishche;
- Velikiye Luki Province: Velikiye Luki, Kholm, and Toropets;
- Tver Province: Tver, Torzhok, Zubtsov, and Staritsa;
- Beloozero Province: Beloozero, Ustyuzhna-Zhelezopolskaya, Charonda, and Kargopol.

In 1764, Jacob Sievers was appointed governor of Novgorod. He discovered that most of the towns in the governorate were located along the western border and were in fact former fortresses, whereas large spaces like for instance between Novgorod and Ustyuzhna, had no towns at all. The general policy of Catherine the Great at the time was to diminish the number of towns and to create large uyezds, and in 1764, most of the uyezds were abolished, however, Sievers argued that this policy was not appropriate for Novgorod Governorate, since it was large, sparsely populated, and difficult to administer. He suggested that Vyshny Volochyok, Valday, Borovichi, and Ostashkov would be chartered instead. In 1770, these towns were indeed chartered.

Novgorod Governorate bordered Poland in the west until 1772. In 1772, as a result of the First Partition of Poland, parts of Livonia and what is now eastern Belarus were transferred to Russia. In order to accommodate these areas, Pskov Governorate was created, and Velikiye Luki and Pskov Provinces (with the exception of future Gdovsky Uyezd) were transferred to this governorate. In 1773, Olonetsky Uyezd was incorporated as Olonets Province but still remained in Novgorod Governorate. The province consisted of three uyezds with the centers in Olonets, Vytegra, and Padansky Pogost. In the same year, Porkhovsky, Gdovsky, Ladozhsky, Starorussky, and Tikhvinsky Uyezds were established.

By 1775, Novgorod Governorate was subdivided as follows:

- Novgorod Province, consisting of Novgorodsky, Starorussky, Porkhovsky, Ladozhsky, Tikhvinsky, Valdaysky, Borovichsky Uyezd, Vyshnevolotsky, and Gdovsky Uyezds;
- Tver Province, consisting of Tverskoy, Novotorzhsky, Staritsky, Rzhevsky, Zubtsovsky, and Ostashkovsky Uyezds;
- Beloozero Province, consisting of Belozersky, Kargopolsky, and Ustyuzhno-Zheleznopolsky Uyezd;
- Olonets Province, consisting of Olonetsky, Vytegorsky, and Padansky Uyezds.

In 1796, after the governorate was restored, it consisted of eleven uyezds,

- Novgorodsky Uyezd (with the administrative center located in Novgorod);
- Belozersky Uyezd (Belozersk);
- Borovichsky Uyezd (Borovichi);
- Kargopolsky Uyezd (Kargopol);
- Olonetsky Uyezd (Olonets);
- Petrozavodsky Uyezd (Petrozavodsk);
- Starorussky Uyezd (Staraya Russa);
- Tikhvinsky Uyezd (Tikhvin);
- Ustyuzhno-Zheleznopolsky Uyezd (Ustyuzhna);
- Valdaysky Uyezd (Valday);
- Vytegorsky Uyezd (Vytegra).

In 1802, Olonets Governorate was restored in pre-1796 borders. It included Petrozavodsky, Olonetsky, Kargopolsky, Vytegorsky, and Lodeynopolsky Uyezds. Simultaneously, Krestetsky Uyezd (with the administrative center located in Kresttsy), Kirillovsky Uyezd (Kirillov), and Cherepovetsky Uyezd (Cherepovets) were re-established.

In 1816, Novgorod Governorate became the area where military settlements were deployed, in accordance with the project designed by Aleksey Arakcheyev, an influential statesman. It was inconvenient to have both civial and military administration in Staraya Russa, and therefore Starorussky Uyezd was abolished in 1824. The town of Staraya Russa and some adjacent territories were directly subordinated to the Defense Ministry. Simultaneously, Demyansk was chartered, and Demyansky Uyezd was established. Military settlements were established in Novgorodsky, Demyansky, and Krestetsky Uyezds. The military settlements were proven inefficient, in particular, in 1831, the area participated in the Cholera Riots. They were abolished in 1856. In 1857, Starorussky Uyezd was re-established.

From 1859 to 1917, the governorate consisted of eleven uezds:

County		County Town	Arms of County Town	Area	Population (1897 census)
Transliteration name	Russian Cyrillic	County Town	Arms of County Town	Area	Population (1897 census)
Belozersky	Бѣлозерскій	Belozersk		14,860.4 km^{2} (5,737.6 sq mi)	86,906
Borovichsky	Боровичскій	Borovichi		10,294 km^{2} (3,975 sq mi)	146,368
Valdaysky	Валдайскій	Valday		6,569.6 km^{2} (2,536.5 sq mi)	95,251
Demyansky	Демянскій	Demyansk		4,919.7 km^{2} (1,899.5 sq mi)	79,791
Kirillovsky	Кирилловскій	Kirillov		13,852.1 km^{2} (5,348.3 sq mi)	120,004
Krestetsky	Крестецкій	Kresttsy		8,965.8 km^{2} (3,461.7 sq mi)	104,389
Novgorodsky	Новгородскій	Novgorod		10,018.8 km^{2} (3,868.3 sq mi)	185,757
Starorussky	Старорусскій	Staraya Russa		9,536.3 km^{2} (3,682.0 sq mi)	191,957
Tikhvinsky	Тихвинскій	Tikhvin		18,401.6 km^{2} (7,104.9 sq mi)	99,367
Ustyuzhensky	Устюжскій	Ustyuzhna		12,879.5 km^{2} (4,972.8 sq mi)	99,737
Cherepovetsky	Череповецкій	Cherepovets		8,246 km^{2} (3,184 sq mi)	157,495

In 1917, two towns of the governorate were chartered but did not become uyezd centers: Bologoye (Valdaysky Uyezd) and Lyuban (Novgorodsky Uyezd). In 1920, Malovishersky Uyezd was established, however, Malaya Vishera (formerly in Krestetsky Uyezd) was not chartered until 1921. In 1922, Krestetsky Uyezd was abolished.

In June 1918, five uyezds of the Novgorod Governorate (Beloozersky, Kirillovsky, Tikhvinsky, Ustyuzhensky, and Cherepovetsky) were split off to create Cherepovets Governorate, with the administrative centre located in Cherepovets.

Thus, by 1927 the governorate consisted of the following six uyezds:

- Novgorodsky Uyezd (with the administrative center located in Novgorod);
- Borovichsky Uyezd (Borovichi);
- Demyansky Uyezd (Demyansk);
- Malovishersky Uyezd (Malaya Vishera);
- Starorussky Uyezd (Staraya Russa);
- Valdaysky Uyezd (Valday).

== Governors ==
The administration of the governorate was performed by a governor. The governors of Novgorod Governorate were

- 1727–1729 Yury Yakovlevich Khilkov, governor;
- 1729 -? Vasily Ivanovich Gagarin, governor;
- ? – ? A. F. Bredikhin, governor;
- ? – ? Vasily Vasilyevich Naryshkin, governor;
- 1742–1743 Grigory Ivanovich Orlov, governor;
- 1743 Pyotr Ivanovich Saltykov, governor;
- 1743–1760 Pyotr Borisovich Cherkassky, governor;
- 1760–1761 Grigory Semyonovich Meshchersky, governor;
- 1761–1764 Stepan Fyodorovich Ushakov, governor;
- 1764–1776 Yakov Yefimovich Sivers (Jacob Sievers), governor.
- 1798 Dmitry Fyodorovich Glinka, governor;
- 1798–1799 Nikifir Mikhaylovich Marin, governor;
- 1799–1800 Vladimir Matveyevich Rzhevsky, governor;
- 1800–1801 Stepan Fyodorovich Obolyaninov, governor;
- 1801–1804 Ivan Mikhaylovich Rikman, governor;
- 1805 Yegor Mikhaylovich Ryabinin, governor;
- 1805–1810 Roman Vasilyevich Ukhtomsky, governor;
- 1809–1812 Duke George of Oldenburg, governor general;
- 1810–1812 Aleksey Vasilyevich Vasilchikov, governor;
- 1812–1813 Pavel Ivanovich Sumarokov, governor;
- 1814–1818 Nikolay Nazaryevich Muravyov, governor;
- 1818–1826 Dmitry Sergeyevich Zherebtsov, governor;
- 1826 Stroyev, acting governor;
- 1826–1834 Avgust Ulyanovich Denfer, governor;
- 1834–1838 Pyotr Lavrentyevich Sukovkin, governor;
- 1838–1840 Ivan Grigoryevich Senyavin, governor;
- 1840–1846 Yelpifidor Antiokhovich Zurov, governor;
- 1846–1848 Khristophor Khristophorovich fon der Khoven (Christoph von der Hoven), governor;
- 1848–1850 Fyodor Ivanovich Vaskov, governor;
- 1851–1853 Fyodor Antonovich Burachkov, governor;
- 1853–1855 Trofim Ivanovich Moskvin, governor;
- 1855–1857 Ivan Sidorovich Kokushkin, governor;
- 1857–1862 Vladimir Ivanovich Filippovich, governor;
- 1862–1864 Vladimir Yakovlevich Skaryatin, governor;
- 1864–1882 Eduard Vasilyevich Lerkhe (Lerche), governor;
- 1882–1894 Alexander Nikolayevich Mosolov, governor;
- 1894–1896 Boris Vladimirovich Shtyurmer (Stuermer), governor;
- 1896–1907 Otton Lyudvigovich Medem, governor;
- 1907–1911 Pyotr Petrovich Bashilov, governor;
- 1911–1913 Viktor Alexandrovich Lopukhin, governor;
- 1913–1917 Mikhail Vladimirovich Islavin, governor.

In 1809, Duke George of Oldenburg was appointed governor general and supervised Novgorod, Tver, and Yaroslavl Governorates. In 1812, he died, and the position of the governor general was abolished.
