= Valdaysky Uyezd =

Subdivisions of the Novgorod Governorate

Valdaysky Uyezd (Валдайский уезд) was one of the subdivisions of the Novgorod Governorate of the Russian Empire. It was situated in the southwestern part of the governorate. Its administrative centre was Valday.

== Demographics ==
At the time of the Russian Empire Census of 1897, Valdaysky Uyezd had a population of 95,251. Of these, 92.8% spoke Russian, 6.1% Karelian, 0.2% Yiddish, 0.2% Estonian, 0.2% Latvian, 0.2% German, 0.1% Polish, 0.1% Romani and 0.1% Tatar as their native language.
