= Krestetsky Uyezd =

Krestetsky Uyezd (Крестецкий уезд) was one of the subdivisions of the Novgorod Governorate of the Russian Empire. It was situated in the southwestern part of the governorate. Its administrative centre was Kresttsy.

== Demographics ==
At the time of the Russian Empire Census of 1897, Krestetsky Uyezd had a population of 104,389. Of these, 95.9% spoke Russian, 1.3% Latvian, 0.9% Estonian, 0.6% German, 0.4% Karelian, 0.3% Yiddish, 0.1% Polish, 0.1% Tatar, 0.1% Belarusian and 0.1% Finnish as their native language.
