= Maryovo =

Maryovo Марёво
- Selo
- Interactive map of Maryovo
- Location of Maryovo Maryovo (Novgorod Oblast)
- Coordinates: 57°19′N 32°05′E
- Country: Russia
- Federal subject: Novgorod Oblast
- Administrative district: Maryovsky District
- settlementSelsoviet: Maryovskoye Settlement

Population (2010 Census)
  - Total: 2,297
  - Estimate (2010): 2,297 (0%)

Administrative status
  - Capital of: Maryovsky District, Maryovskoye Settlement

Municipal status
  - Municipal district: Maryovsky Municipal District
  - Rural settlement: Maryovskoye Rural Settlement
  - Capital of: Maryovsky Municipal District, Maryovskoye Rural Settlement
- Time zone: UTC+3 (MSK)
- Postal code: 175350
- OKTMO ID: 49623419101

Maryovo (Russian: Марёво) is a rural locality (a selo) and the administrative center of Maryovsky District of Novgorod Oblast, Russia, located in the south of the oblast, on the Maryovka River, a tributary of the Pola River. Municipally, it is the administrative center of Maryovskoye Rural Settlement. Population: 2,297 (2010 census); 2,631 (2002 census); 2,797 (1989 Soviet census).

== History ==
Maryovo was mentioned in a chronicle in 1495 as Maryova. At the time, it was a part of Derevskaya Pyatina of the Novgorod Republic. Between 1612 and 1617, during the Ingrian War, it was occupied by Polish and Swedish troops. By 1620, it was completely depopulated and had to be repopulated again. In the course of the administrative reform carried out in 1708 by Peter the Great, the area was included into Ingermanland Governorate (known since 1710 as Saint Petersburg Governorate). In 1727, separate Novgorod Governorate was split off. Until and 1824, Maryovo was a part of Starorussky Uyezd of Novgorod Viceroyalty (since 1796 of Novgorod Governorate). In 1824, it was transferred to Demyansky Uyezd, which was split off Starorussky Uyezd.

On August 1, 1927, the uyezds were abolished, and Molvotitsky District was established, with the center in the selo of Molvotitsy. Novgorod Governorate was abolished as well, and the district belonged to Novgorod Okrug of Leningrad Oblast. Maryovo was part of Molvotitsky District. On July 23, 1930 the okrugs were abolished, and the districts became directly subordinate to the oblast. During World War II it was occupied by German troops. On February 19, 1944 the district center was transferred from Molvotitsy to Maryovo. On July 5, 1944, Molvotitsky District was transferred to newly established Novgorod Oblast. On December 10, 1962 Molvotitsky District was abolished, and Maryovo became a part of Demyansky District. On December 30 the district was re-established as Maryovsky District, and Maryovo became the district center again.

== Economy ==
=== Industry ===
The economy of Maryovo, as well as of the whole district, is based on timber industry.

=== Transportation ===
Maryovo is connected by roads to Demyansk and Kholm. Through these localities, it has access to Veliky Novgorod and also to M10 highway connecting Moscow and Saint Petersburg. There are also local roads.

== Culture and recreation ==
There are four cultural heritage monuments of local significance in Maryovo. These include an archaeological monument and three monuments to fallen soldiers.
