= Maryovsky District =

Maryovsky District Марёвский район (Russian)
- District
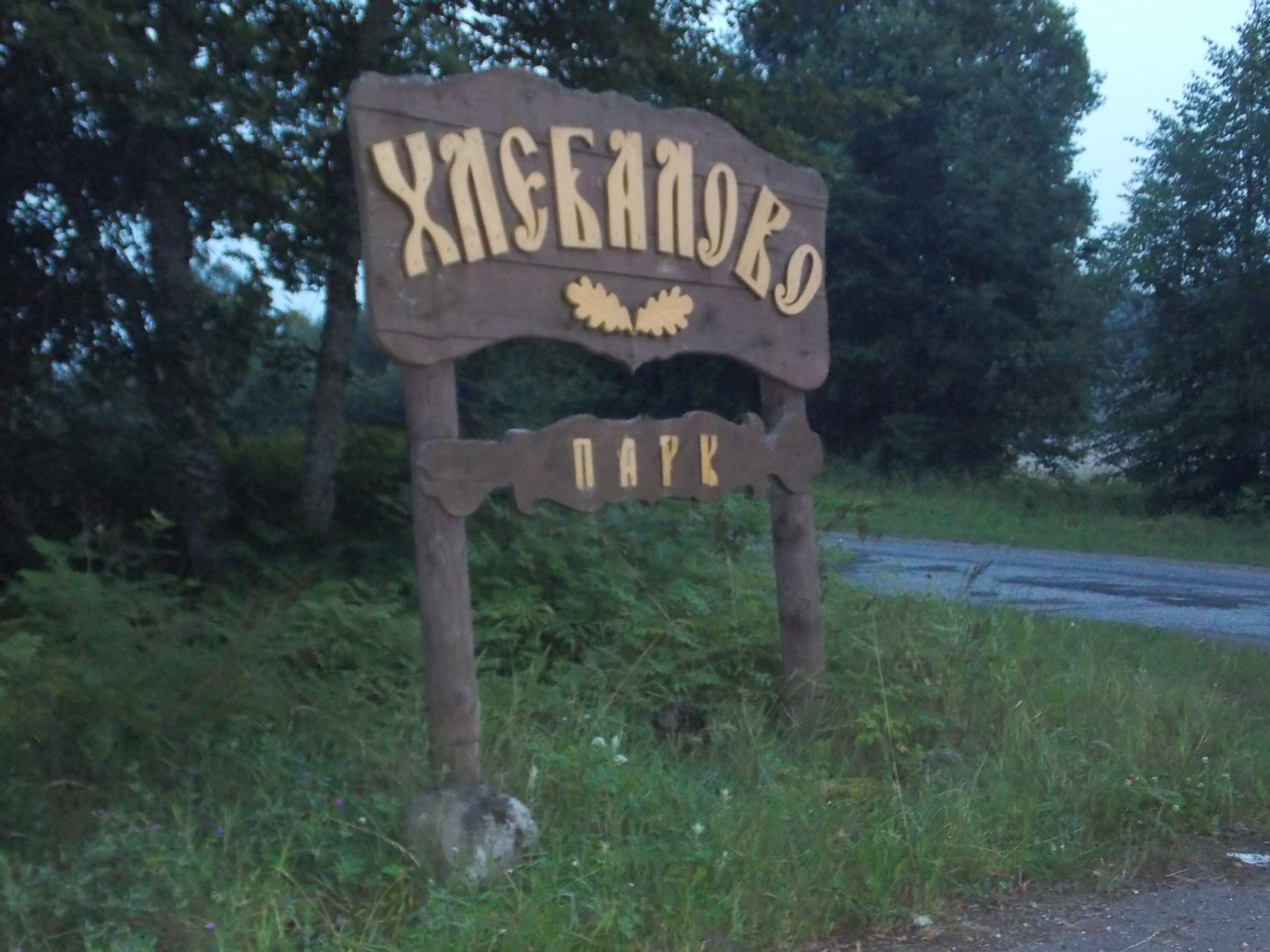
- Khlebalovo Park, Maryovsky District

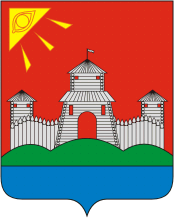
- Coat of arms
- Location of Maryovsky District in Novgorod Oblast
- Coordinates: 57°19′N 32°05′E
- Country: Russia
- Federal subject: Novgorod Oblast
- Established: October 1, 1927
- Administrative center: Maryovo

Area
  - Total: 1,800 km^{2} (690 sq mi)

Population (2010 Census)
  - Total: 4,673
  - Density: 2.6/km^{2} (6.7/sq mi)
  - Urban: 0%
  - Rural: 100%

Administrative structure
  - Administrative divisions: 4 Settlements
  - Inhabited localities: 139 rural localities

Municipal structure
  - Municipally incorporated as: Maryovsky Municipal District
  - Municipal divisions: 0 urban settlements, 4 rural settlements
- Time zone: UTC+3 (MSK)
- OKTMO ID: 49623000
- Website: http://marevoadm.ru

Maryovsky District (Russian: Марёвский район) is an administrative and municipal district (raion), one of the twenty-one in Novgorod Oblast, Russia. It is located in the south of the oblast and borders with Demyansky District in the north, Ostashkovsky and Penovsky Districts of Tver Oblast in the southeast, Andreapolsky District of Tver Oblast and Kholmsky District in the southwest, Poddorsky District in the west, and with Starorussky District in the northwest. The area of the district is 1,800 square kilometers (690 sq mi). Its administrative center is the rural locality (a selo) of Maryovo. District's population: 4,673 (2010 census); 5,711 (2002 Census); 6,835 (1989 Soviet census). The population of Maryovo accounts for 49.2% of the district's total population.

== Geography ==
Almost all of the area of the district belongs to the basin of the Pola River and only minor areas in the western part of the district are in the basin of the Lovat. The district is located on the northern slope of the western part of the Valdai Hills, and the rivers mostly flow from south to north. The Pola crosses the district, and its biggest tributary within the district is the Maryovka River.

== History ==
Maryovo (Maryova) was mentioned in a chronicle in 1495. The area was a part of Derevskaya Pyatina of the Novgorod Republic. Between 1612 and 1617, during the Ingrian War, it was occupied by Polish and Swedish troops. By 1620, the area became completely depopulated and had to be repopulated again. In the course of the administrative reform carried out in 1708 by Peter the Great, the area was included into Ingermanland Governorate (known since 1710 as Saint Petersburg Governorate). In 1727, separate Novgorod Governorate was split off. Until 1824, Maryovo was a part of Starorussky Uyezd of Novgorod Viceroyalty (since 1796 of Novgorod Governorate). In 1824, the area was transferred to Demyansky Uyezd, which was split from Starorussky Uyezd.

In August 1927, the governorates and uyezds were abolished. Molvotitsky District, with the administrative center in the selo of Molvotitsy, was established within Novgorod Okrug of Leningrad Oblast effective October 1, 1927. It included parts of former Demyansky Uyezd. On July 23, 1930, the okrugs were abolished, and the districts were directly subordinated to the oblast. On September 6, 1941, Molvotitsky District was occupied by German troops. It was partially liberated on January 15, 1942 and fully liberated on February 15, 1943. On February 19, 1944, the administrative center of the district was transferred from Molvotitsy to the selo of Maryovo. On July 5, 1944, Molvotitsky District was transferred to newly established Novgorod Oblast. On July 22, 1961, a part of abolished Zaluchsky District was merged into Molvotitsky District. On February 1, 1963, the district was abolished in the course of the Nikita Khrushchev's administrative reform. On December 30, 1966, the district was re-established as Maryovsky District. It included the part of the former Molvotitsky District which was previously transferred to Demyansky District.

== Abolished districts ==
Effective October 1, 1927, Zaluchsky District with the administrative center in the selo of Zaluchye was established as well, as a part of Novgorod Okrug of Leningrad Oblast. It included parts of Starorussky Uyezd. Between August 1941 and February 1943, Zaluchsky District was occupied by German troops. On July 5, 1944, Zaluchsky District was transferred to newly established Novgorod Oblast. On July 22, 1961, Zaluchsky District was abolished and split between Starorussky and Molvotitsky Districts.

== Economy ==
=== Industry ===
The economy of the district is based on timber industry.

=== Agriculture ===
The agriculture of the district is in a deep recession. As of 2010, only 9% of available fields were used for agricultural purposes. Other agricultural specializations in the district are cattle and swine breeding.

=== Transportation ===
Maryovo is connected by roads to Demyansk and Kholm. Through these localities, it has access to Veliky Novgorod and also to M10 Highway connecting Moscow and St. Petersburg. There are also local roads.

== Culture and recreation ==
The district contains 3 cultural heritage monuments of federal significance and additionally 117 objects classified as cultural and historical heritage of local significance. All federal monuments are archaeological sites.
