= Valdaysky =

Valdaysky (masculine), Valdayskaya (feminine), or Valdayskoye (neuter) may refer to:

- Valdaysky District, a district of Novgorod Oblast, Russia
- Valdayskoye Urban Settlement, a municipal formation which the town of district significance of Valday in Valdaysky District of Novgorod Oblast, Russia is incorporated as
- Valdayskoye (rural locality), a rural locality (a settlement) in Kaliningrad Oblast, Russia

== See also ==
- Valday (disambiguation)
