= Valdaysky National Park =

National park in Novgorod Oblast, Russia

- IUCN category II (national park)
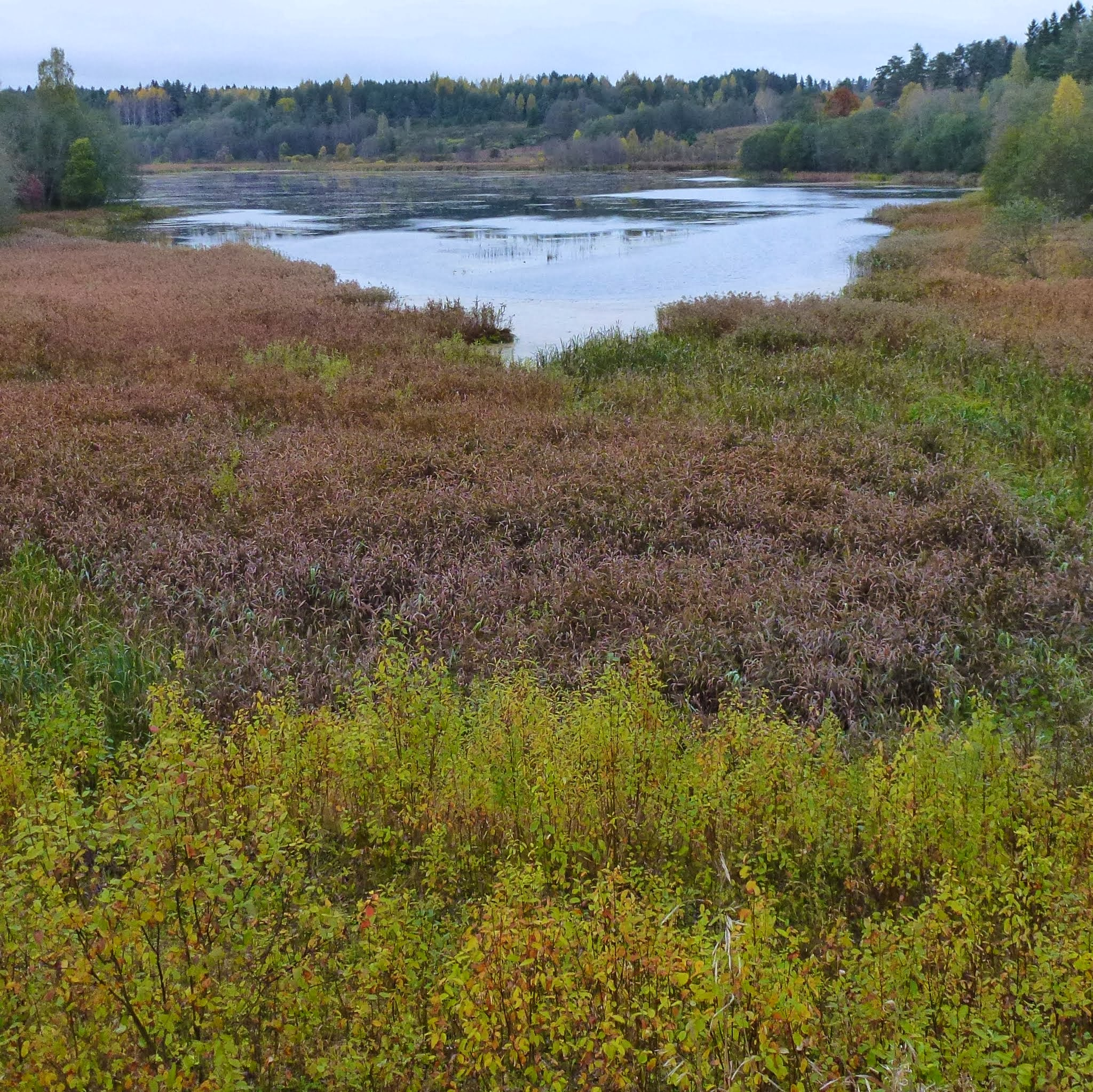
- Lake Uzhin in Valdaysky National Park

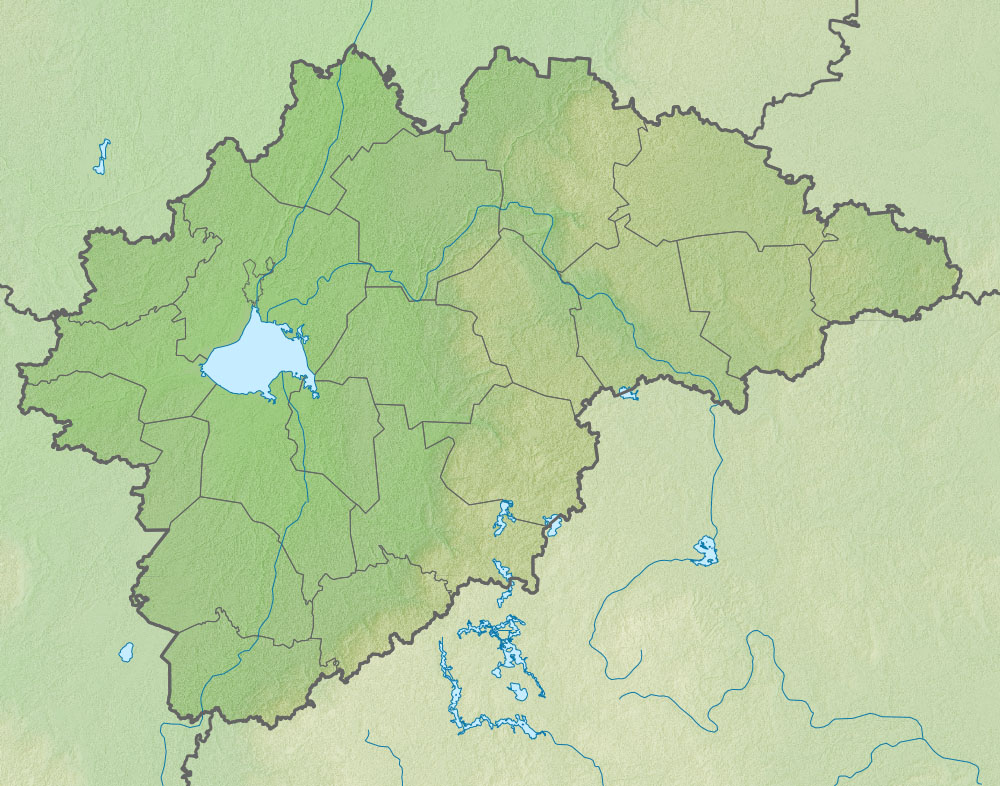
- Location within Novgorod Oblast Location within European Russia
- Location: Russia
- Nearest city: Valday
- Coordinates: 57°58′45″N 33°15′10″E
- Area: 1,585 square kilometres (612 mi^{2})
- Established: 1990
- Visitors: Approximately 60,000 (in 2011)
- Governing body

Valdaysky National Park (Russian: Валдайский национальный парк, romanized: Valdayskiy natsional'nyy park) is a national park in the north of Russia, in the Valdaysky, Okulovsky, and Demyansky Districts of Novgorod Oblast. It was established May 17, 1990. It has been a UNESCO Biosphere Reserve since 2004. The park, which includes the town of Valday, Lake Valdayskoye, and the northern part of Lake Seliger, is one of the most popular tourist destinations in Central Russia and has well-developed tourist infrastructure.

== History ==
The area of the park in the Middle Ages belonged to the Novgorod Republic. In particular, one of the versions puts the location of the Ignach Cross, a place mentioned in the chronicles where Mongols advancing to Novgorod in 1238 turned back, inside the park limits. (The precise location is unknown). Valday was first mentioned in a chronicle in 1495. The growth of Valday was facilitated by construction of a road connecting Novgorod to Central Russia, and by the foundation of the Valday Iversky Monastery in 1653, which became a major cultural center. All agricultural lands were already in use by the beginning of the 20th century, and the area developed further as a recreational region. In 1990, the national park was opened.

== Location and geography ==
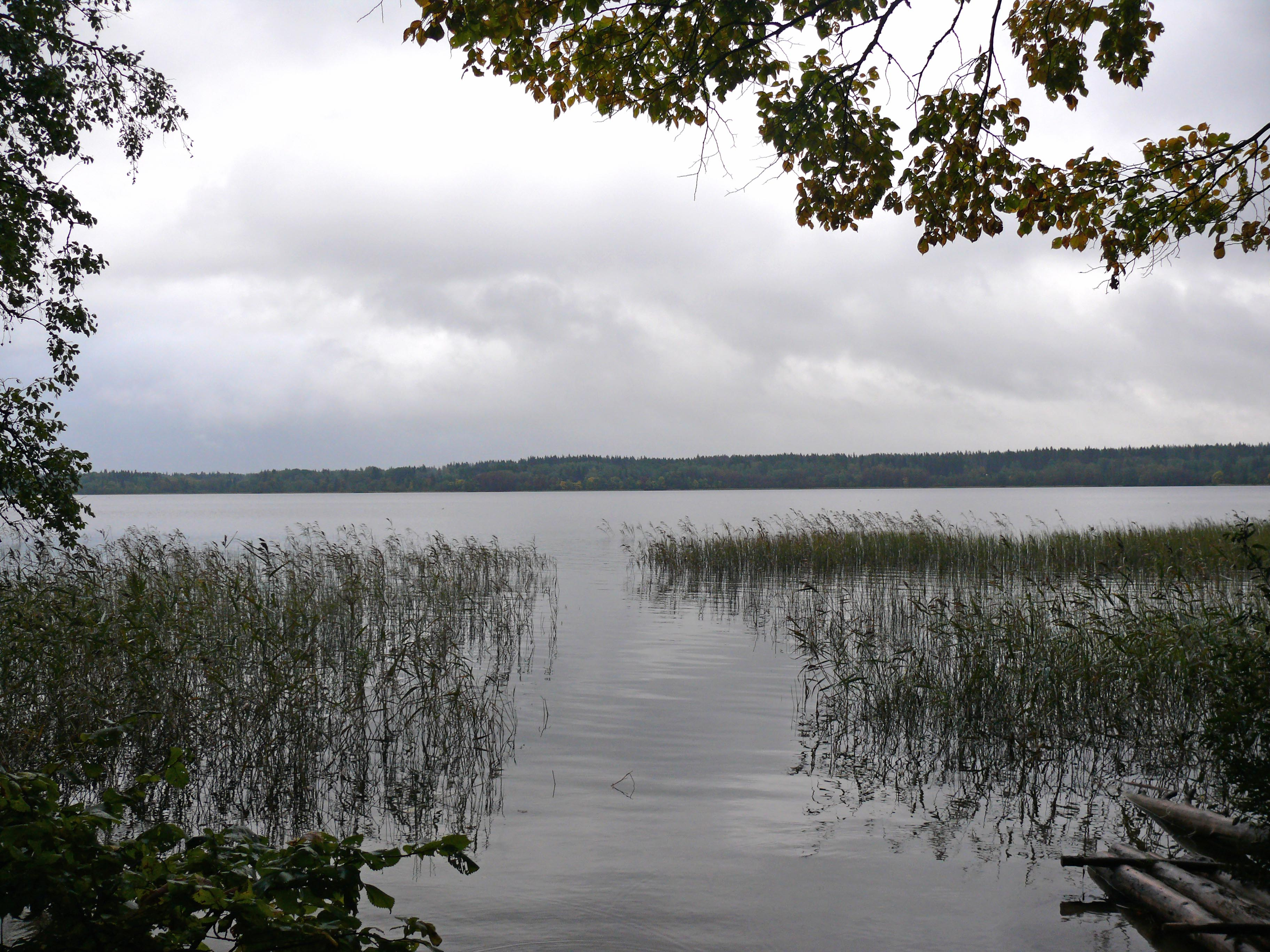
The eastern part of Lake Valdayskoye.

The park is located in the northern, and the highest, part of the Valdai Hills. The area of the park is divided among three districts of Novgorod Oblast, with 12% located in Okulovsky District, 62% in Valdaysky District, and 26% in Demyansky District, respectively. The landscapes of the park were formed during the ice age and are characteristic for glacial landscape forms. In particular, the park contains 76 lakes of various origin. The biggest lakes are Lake Seliger (only a small portion of it lies within the park limits), Lake Valdayskoye, Lake Velyo, Lake Uzhin, and Lake Borovno. The park belongs to the river basins of the Pola, the Msta and the Volga. The Valdayka River, a tributary of the Berezayka River, originates from Lake Uzhin, and the Polomet River, a tributary of the Pola River, also has its source inside the park.

=== Flora ===
The area of 1,362 square kilometres (526 mi^{2}) which makes it 85.9% of the total area of the park, is occupied by forest. Water (mostly lakes) occupies 9.2% of the area, swamps — 2.9%. The most common tree species are birch (Betula pubescens, Betula pendula), alder (Alnus incana), spruce (Picea abies), and pine (Pinus sylvestris). A special type are oak forest (about 0.1% of the total forested area), which are in the park at their northern range.

=== Fauna ===
In the park, there are fifty species of mammals, 180 species of birds, and about 40 species of fish. Red fox, mink, marten, moose, wild boar, brown bear, lynx, and grey wolf are all common in the park.

== Tourism ==
The park comprises historically significant area, including the town of Valday, Valday Iversky Monastery, and a number of the 19th century estates. The area attracted artists and authors since the 19th century, and is currently one of the most popular tourist destinations in Central Russia. The area of the park is sufficiently covered by roads. There are many recreational facilities, mostly located at and around Lake Valdayskoye and Lake Seliger.
