= Valday =

Valday or Valdai may refer to:

- Valdai Hills, an upland region in Russia
- Valdai Discussion Club
- Valday (inhabited locality), several inhabited localities in Russia
- Lake Valdayskoye (or Lake Valdai), a lake in Novgorod Oblast, Russia
- Valday (ship), a class of Russian freight ships
- Dolgiye Borody (residence), a home of the president of Russia, also commonly known as "Valdai"
