= Polomet =

Polomet Russian: Полометь

Location
- Country: Russia

Physical characteristics
- Source: Lake Russkoye
- Mouth: Pola
  - coordinates: 57°40′49″N 32°12′04″E
- Length: 150 km (93 mi)
- Basin size: 2,770 km^{2} (1,070 sq mi)
- Discharge
  - average: 7.74 cubic metres per second (273 cu ft/s)

Basin features
- Progression: Pola→ Lake Ilmen→ Volkhov→ Lake Ladoga→ Neva→ Gulf of Finland

The Polomet (Russian: Полометь) is a river in Valdaysky, Krestetsky, and Demyansky Districts of Novgorod Oblast in Russia. It is a right tributary of the Pola. It is 150 kilometres (93 mi) long, and the area of its basin 2,770 square kilometres (1,070 sq mi). The principal tributary of the Polomet is the Luzhonka (left).

The source of the Polomet is in Lake Russkoye in the Valdai Hills. The source and the upper course of the Polomet is located within Valdaysky National Park. The river flows west, then turns north. At the selo of Yazhelbitsy the Polomet makes a turn, crosses into Krestetsky District, returns to Valdaysky District, and crosses into Demyansky District. In Demyansky District, it flows southwest. In the selo of Lychkovo, it crosses the railroad which connects Bologoye and Pskov via Staraya Russa. The mouth of the Polomet is close to the village of Kostkovo (which is located on the left bank of the Pola).

The river basin of the Polomet comprises the western part of Valdaysky District, including some of the lakes in Valdaysky National Park, the southern part of Krestetsky District, and the northwestern part of Demyansky District.

The Polomet is attractive for kayaking and rafting. In summer, the stretch between Lychkovo and the mouth is used. In the spring, the stretch upstream from Yazhelbitsy is used.

Until the 1990s, the Polomet was used for timber rafting.
