= Valdayka =

Valdayka River
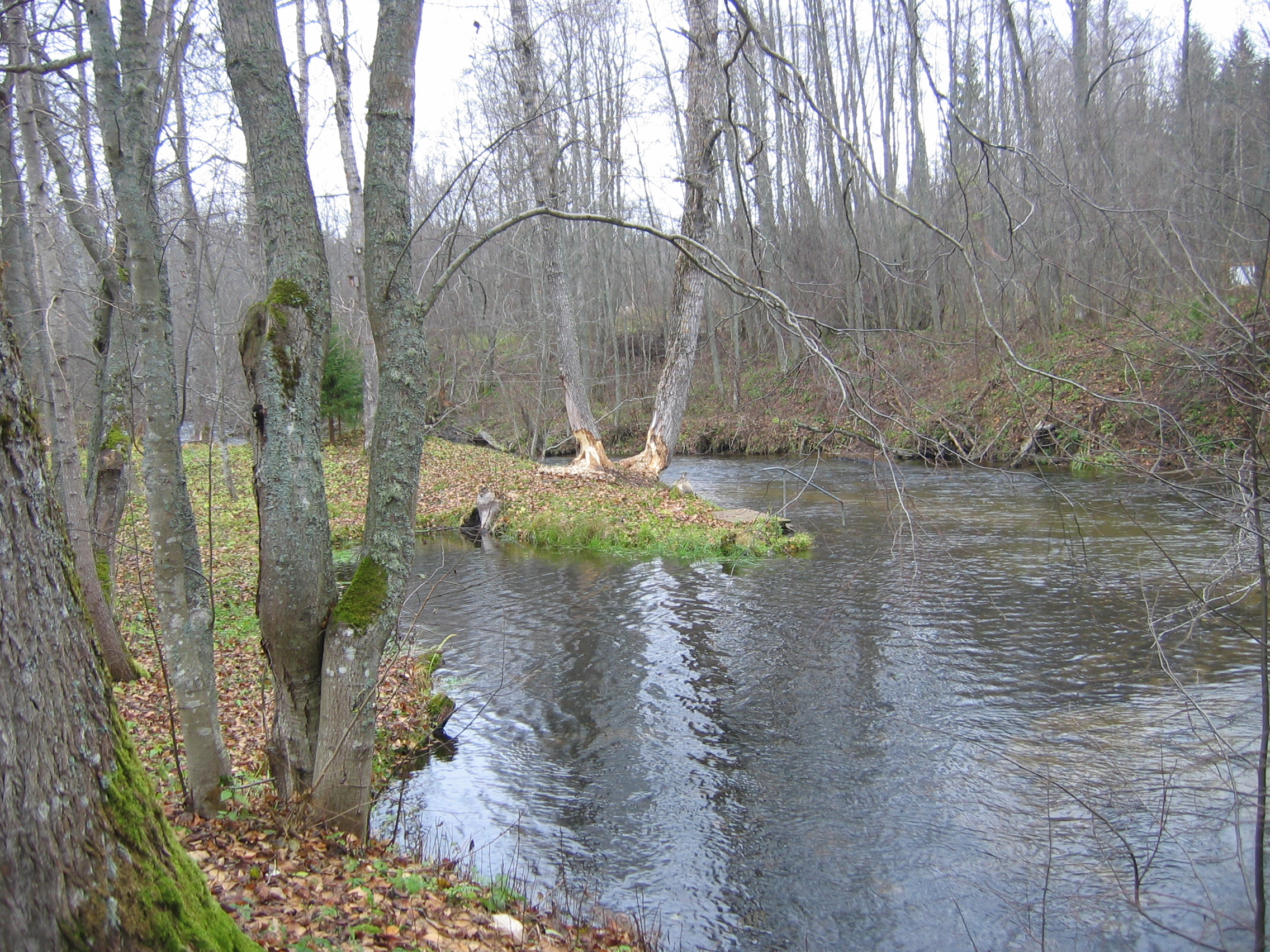
- The Valdayka in October 2011

Location
- Country: Russia

Physical characteristics
- Source
  - location: Lake Uzhin
- Mouth: Lake Piros
  - coordinates: 58°08′44″N 33°50′00″E
- Length: 50 km (31 mi)
- Basin size: 783 km^{2} (302 sq mi)

Basin features
- Progression: Lake Piros→ Berezayka→ Msta→ Lake Ilmen→ Volkhov→ Lake Ladoga→ Neva→ Gulf of Finland

The Valdayka (Russian: Валда́йка) is a river in Valdaysky District of Novgorod Oblast and in Bologovsky District of Tver Oblast in Russia. It is a tributary of Lake Piros and belongs to the basin of the river Msta. It is 50 kilometres (31 mi) long, and the area of its basin 783 square kilometres (302 sq mi).

The Valdayka flows over the Valdai Hills and is a part of the waterway from Lake Valdayskoye to Lake Ilmen. The source of the Valdayka is in Lake Uzhin within the Valdaysky National Park, close to the town of Valday. The river flows north-east to Lake Piros. It runs through a number of lakes 3 to 4 kilometres (1.9 to 2.5 mi) long and 300 to 400 metres (980 to 1,310 ft) wide, in particular, Lake Zakidovskoye and Lake Plotichno. The Moscow – Saint Petersburg Railway crosses the Valdayka close to the village of Lykoshino. Since the Berezayka flows through the Lake Piros, the Valdayka is considered its tributary.

As many rivers in the Valdai Hills, it is a popular rafting route.
