= Demyansky District =

Demyansky District Демянский район (Russian)
- District
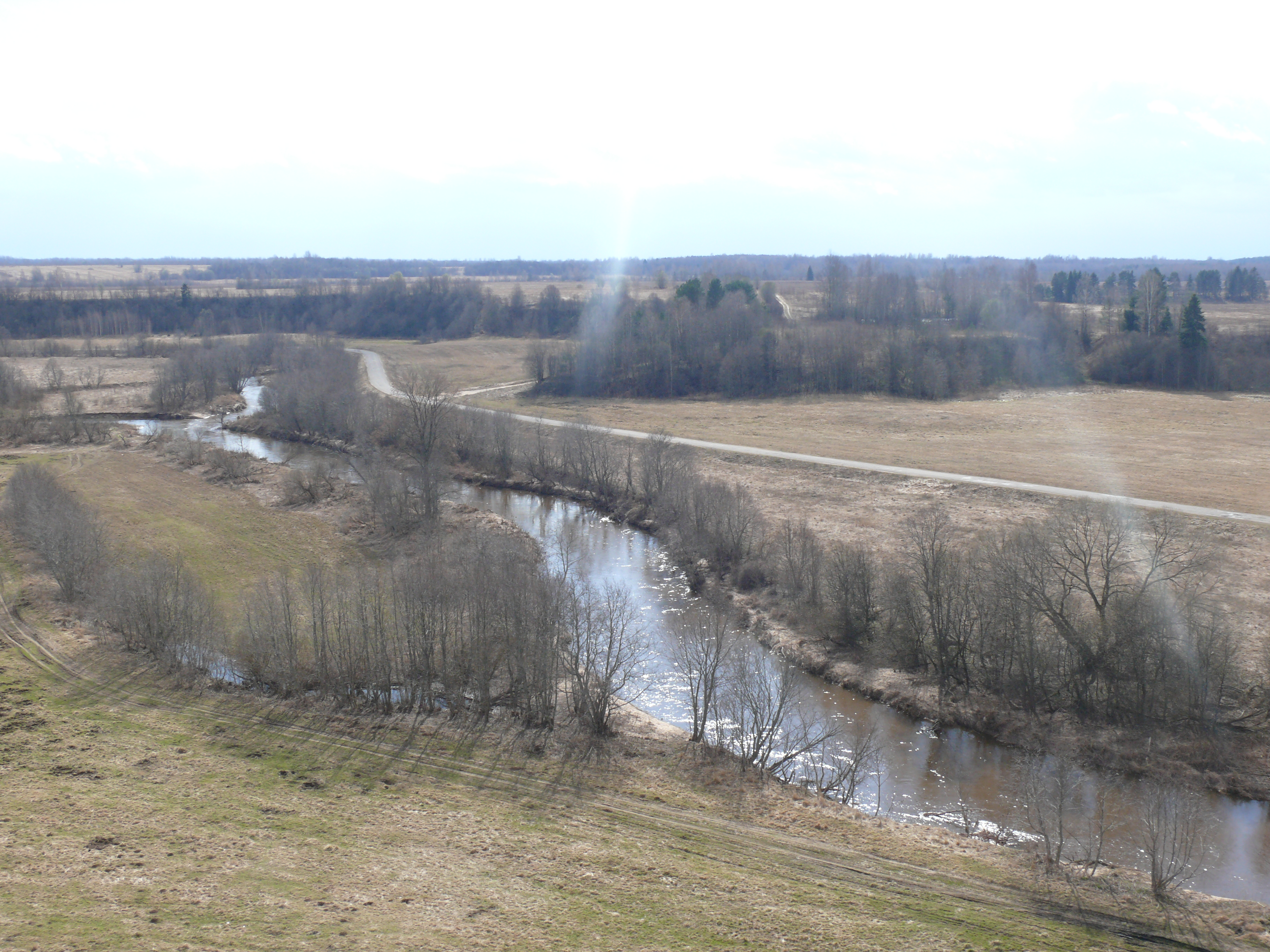
- Confluence of the Kunyanka and Yavon Rivers in Demyansky District

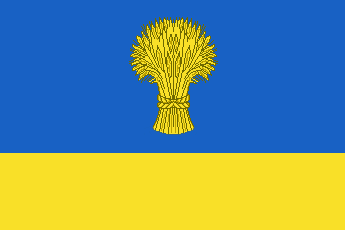
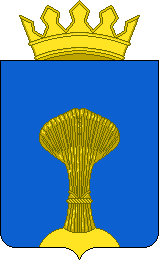
- Flag Coat of arms
- Location of Demyansky District in Novgorod Oblast
- Coordinates: 57°38′N 32°28′E
- Country: Russia
- Federal subject: Novgorod Oblast
- Established: October 1, 1927
- Administrative center: Demyansk

Area
  - Total: 3,200 km^{2} (1,200 sq mi)

Population (2010 Census)
  - Total: 13,001
  - Density: 4.1/km^{2} (11/sq mi)
  - Urban: 41.3%
  - Rural: 58.7%

Administrative structure
  - Administrative divisions: 1 Urban-type settlements, 7 Settlements
  - Inhabited localities: 1 urban-type settlements, 230 rural localities

Municipal structure
  - Municipally incorporated as: Demyansky Municipal District
  - Municipal divisions: 1 urban settlements, 7 rural settlements
- Time zone: UTC+3 (MSK)
- OKTMO ID: 49612000
- Website: http://www.dem-admin.ru/

Demyansky District (Russian: Демянский район) is an administrative and municipal district (raion), one of the twenty-one in Novgorod Oblast, Russia. It is located in the south of the oblast and borders with Krestetsky District in the north, Valdaysky District in the northeast, Firovsky District of Tver Oblast in the southeast, Ostashkovsky District of Tver Oblast in the south, Maryovsky District in the southwest, Starorussky District in the west, and with Parfinsky District in the northwest. The area of the district is 3,200 square kilometers (1,200 sq mi). Its administrative center is the urban locality (a work settlement) of Demyansk. Population: 13,001 (2010 census); 16,020 (2002 Census); 18,488 (1989 Soviet census). The population of Demyansk accounts for 41.3% of the district's total population.

== Geography ==
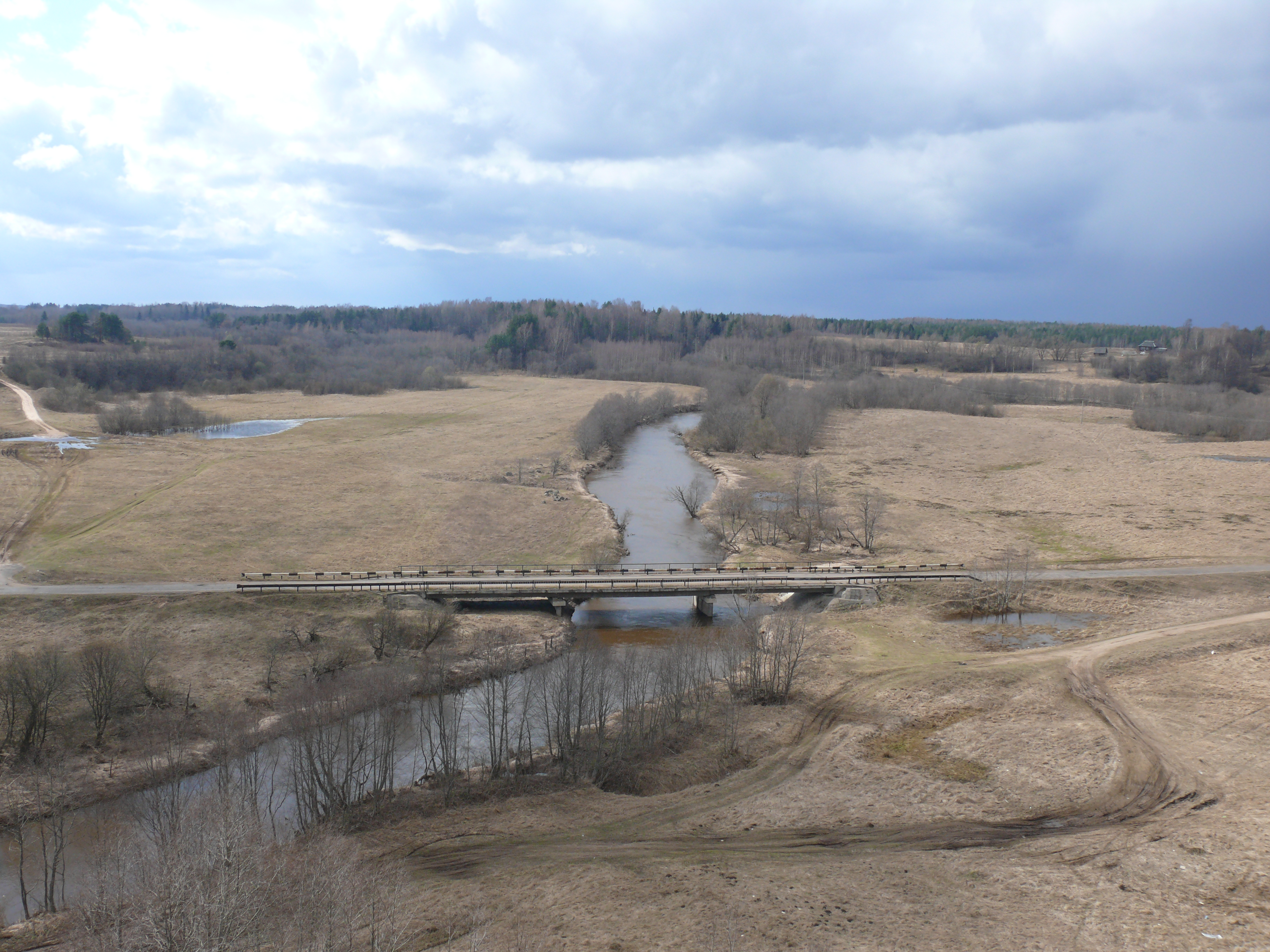
The Yavon River in the village of Peski

Demyansky District is located in the Valdai Hills. As typical for the region, the east of the district contains many lakes. The biggest ones are Lake Seliger, which the district shares with Tver Oblast, and Lake Velyo, shared with Valdaysky District. Lake Seliger and adjacent areas belong to the basin of the Volga River. The western part of the district lies in the basin of the Pola River and its tributaries, the biggest of which are the Polomet and the Yavon. Minor areas in the east of the district belong to the drainage basin of the Msta River. The divide between the basins of the Atlantic Ocean (to which the Pola and the Msta belong) and the Caspian Sea (to which Lake Seliger belongs) thus runs through the district. 12% of the district's territory is occupied by the Valdaysky National Park, which protects forests and lakes in the Valdai Hills and includes Lake Seliger.

== History ==
The area was a part of Derevskaya Pyatina of the Novgorod Republic. The fortress of Demon, which protected the waterway from Lake Ilmen upstream the Pola and the Yavon to Lake Seliger, was first mentioned in a 1406 chronicle. The fortress was located close to the boundary between the Novgorod Republic and the Grand Duchy of Moscow and it was besieged by Muscovite troops at least twice. The Muscovites did not manage to conquer Demon in 1441, but in the 1470s they were more successful and managed to conquer and destroy the fortress. After the subsequent fall of Novgorod, Demon was transferred to the Grand Duchy of Moscow. In the 17th century, Demon went into decline and a new settlement—known initially as Demyansky Pogost and later as Demyansk—was founded nearby. In the course of the administrative reform carried out in 1708 by Peter the Great, the area was included into Ingermanland Governorate (known since 1710 as Saint Petersburg Governorate). In 1727, separate Novgorod Governorate was split off. Between 1772 and 1824, Demyansk was a part of Starorussky Uyezd of Novgorod Viceroyalty (since 1796 of Novgorod Governorate). In 1824, it was chartered and became the seat of Demyansky Uyezd, which was split from Starorussky Uyezd.

In August 1927, the governorates and uyezds were abolished. Demyansky District, with the administrative center in the town Demyansk, was established within Novgorod Okrug of Leningrad Oblast effective October 1, 1927. It included parts of former Demyansky and Starorussky Uyezds. At the same time, the town of Demyansk was demoted to a rural locality (a selo). On July 23, 1930, the okrugs were abolished, and the districts were directly subordinated to the oblast. On January 1, 1932, Polnovo-Seligersky District was abolished and merged into Demyansky District. Between September 9, 1941 and February 21, 1943, Demyansky District was occupied by German troops. The district was the area of fierce battles, and, in 1942 in particular, some German troops were encircled but subsequently managed to break out. On July 5, 1944, Demyansky District was transferred to newly established Novgorod Oblast, where it remained ever since. On December 10, 1962, a part of Polavsky District was merged into Demyansky District. Between February 1, 1963 and January 12, 1965, the district was transformed into Demyansky Rural District, as a part of Nikita Khrushchev's abortive administrative reforms. On February 1, 1963, most of Molvotitsky District's territory was merged into Demyansky Rural District, but on December 30, 1966, the merger was reverted. Also on February 1, 1963, Lychkovsky District was split and merged into Demyansky Rural District and Krestetsky Industrial District.

== Economy ==
=== Industry ===
There are no large industrial enterprises in the district. The existing enterprises serve timber and food industries.

=== Agriculture ===
As of 2011, there were seven collective farms and fourteen mid-scale private farms operating in the district and specializing on both animal husbandry and horticulture.

=== Transportation ===
A railway which connects Bologoye and Pskov via Staraya Russa crosses the district from east to west. The main station within the district is Lychkovo.

Demyansk is located on the road connecting Yazhelbitsy and Staraya Russa. There are also local roads.

Lake Seliger is navigable.

== Culture and recreation ==
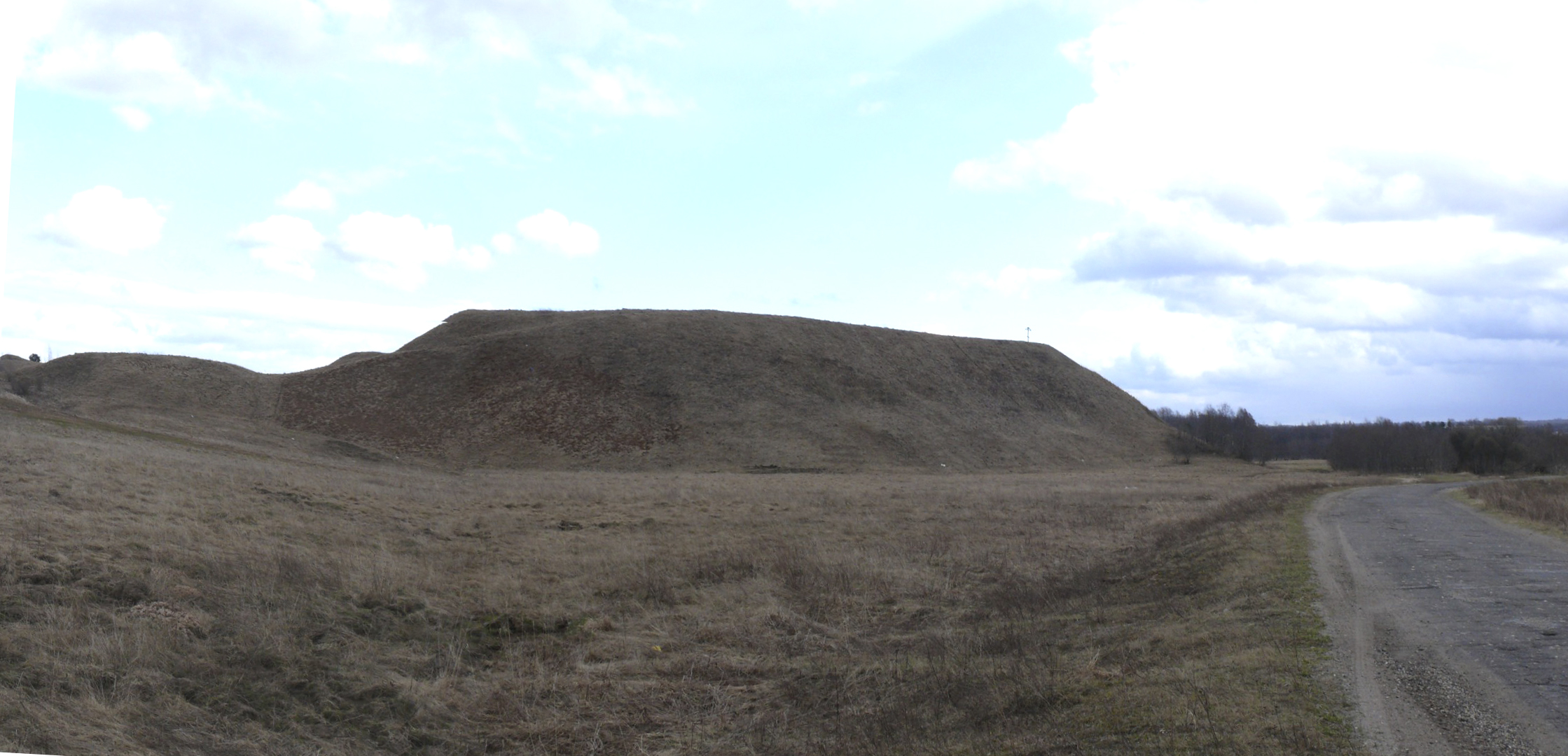
Knyazhaya Gora

The district contains 1 cultural heritage monument of federal significance and additionally 231 objects classified as cultural and historical heritage of local significance. The federal monument is the "Knyazhaya Gora" (The Prince Hill) archaeological site.

Demyansk is home of the Demyansky District Museum.
