= Valday (ship) =

Class of Russian freight ships

Class overview
- Name: Valday / Project 01010
- Builders: Severnaya Verf
- Operators: North-Western Shipping Company
- In service: 2002-
- Planned: 10
- Completed: 3

General characteristics
- Type: River freight
- Tons burthen: 3580-4800 tons
- Length: 128.2 m (421 ft)
- Beam: 16.7 m (55 ft)
- Draught: 3.6 m (12 ft)
- Propulsion: 2930hp

The Valday class of freight ships carry dry cargo, containers and timber up and down the rivers of Northern Russia. The class is named after Valday, a town midway between Moscow and St. Petersburg on the shores of Lake Valdayskoye in the Valdai Hills.

== Description ==
The Valday's have three covered holds, with engineering spaces and superstructure in the stern.

== Ships ==
- Svyatoy Apostol Andrey
- Svyatoy Knyaz Vladimir
- Svyatitel Aleksiy
