= Demyansky =

Demyansky (masculine), Demyanskaya (feminine), or Demyanskoye (neuter) may refer to:

- Demyansky District, a district of Novgorod Oblast, Russia
- Demyanskoye, Tyumen Oblast, a rural locality (a selo) in Tyumen Oblast, Russia
- Demyanskoye, Yaroslavl Oblast, a rural locality (a village) in Yaroslavl Oblast, Russia
