= Valdaysky District =

Valdaysky District Валдайский район (Russian)
- District
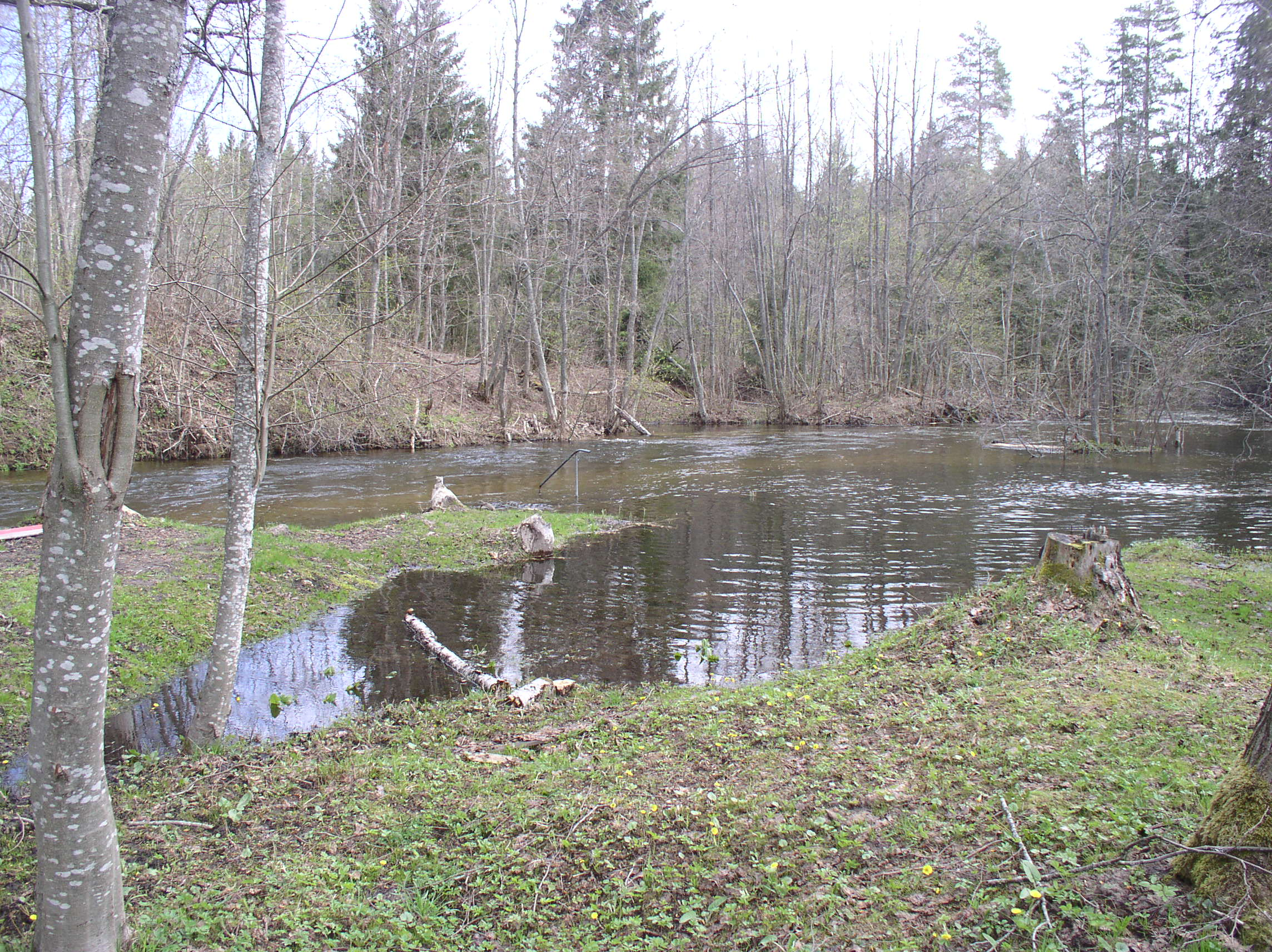
- The Valdayka River in Valdaysky District

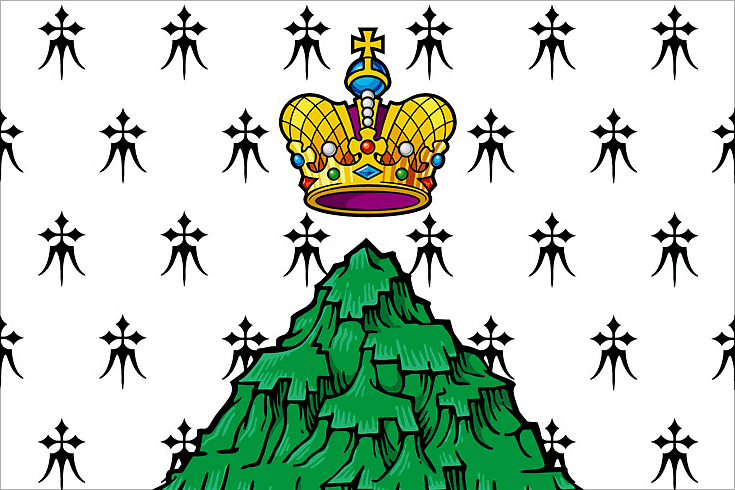
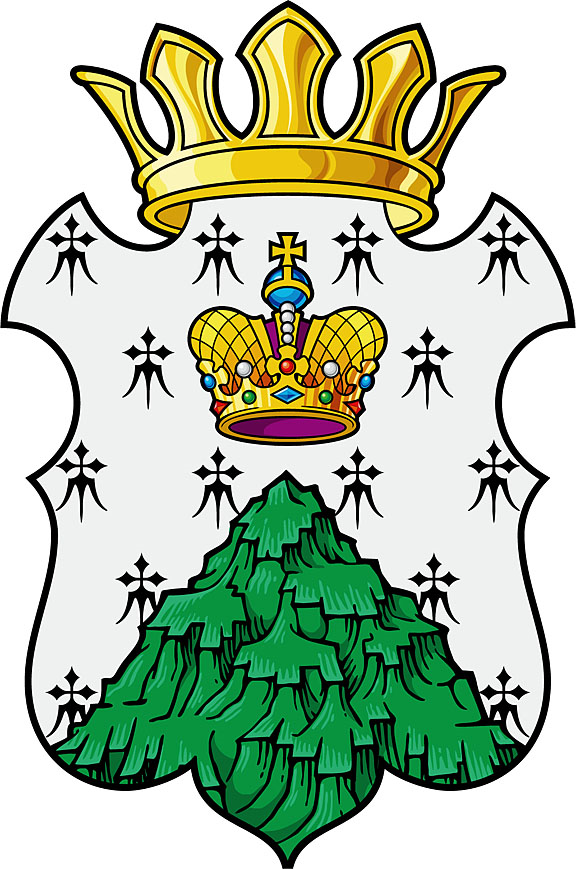
- Flag Coat of arms
- Location of Valdaysky District in Novgorod Oblast
- Coordinates: 57°58′N 33°15′E
- Country: Russia
- Federal subject: Novgorod Oblast
- Established: October 1, 1927
- Administrative center: Valday

Area
  - Total: 2,701.63 km^{2} (1,043.11 sq mi)

Population (2010 Census)
  - Total: 26,476
  - Density: 9.8000/km^{2} (25.382/sq mi)
  - Urban: 60.8%
  - Rural: 39.2%

Administrative structure
  - Administrative divisions: 1 Towns of district significance, 8 Settlements
  - Inhabited localities: 1 cities/towns, 183 rural localities

Municipal structure
  - Municipally incorporated as: Valdaysky Municipal District
  - Municipal divisions: 1 urban settlements, 8 rural settlements
- Time zone: UTC+3 (MSK)
- OKTMO ID: 49608000
- Website: http://valdayadm.ru/

Valdaysky District (Russian: Валда́йский райо́н) is an administrative and municipal district (raion), one of the twenty-one in Novgorod Oblast, Russia. It is located in the southeast of the oblast and borders with Okulovsky District in the north, Bologovsky District of Tver Oblast in the east, the territory of the closed administrative-territorial formation of Ozyorny of Tver Oblast in the southeast, Firovsky District of Tver Oblast in the south, Demyansky District in the southwest, and with Krestetsky District in the northwest. The area of the district is 2,701.63 square kilometers (1,043.11 sq mi). Its administrative center is the town of Valday. Population: 26,476 (2010 census); 29,943 (2002 Census); 32,373 (1989 Soviet census). The population of Valday accounts for 60.8% of the district's total population.

== Geography ==
Valdaysky District is located in the Valdai Hills and is notable for having many lakes. The biggest lakes in the district are Lakes Valdayskoye, Shlino (shared with Firovsky District), and Velyo (shared with Demyansky District). The whole district belongs to the basin of the Volkhov River. The western and northwestern parts of the district lie within the basin of the tributaries of the Pola River, including the Polomet. The Polomet itself has its source in the district. The center and the east of the district, including Lake Valdayskoye, belong to the basin of the Berezayka River, a left tributary of the Msta. The divide between the basins of the Atlantic Ocean and the Caspian Sea thus crosses the district in its southern part.

The central part of the district, including the town of Valday, belongs to the Valdaysky National Park which is shared between Okulovsky, Valdaysky, and Demyansky Districts.

== History ==
Valday was first mentioned in a chronicle in 1495. At the time, the area was a part of Derevskaya Pyatina of the Novgorod Lands. The growth of Valday was facilitated by the construction of a road connecting Novgorod to Central Russia, and by the foundation of the Valday Iversky Monastery in 1653, which became a major cultural center. In the course of the administrative reform carried out in 1708 by Peter the Great, the area was included into Ingermanland Governorate (known since 1710 as Saint Petersburg Governorate). In 1727, separate Novgorod Governorate was split off. In 1770, Valday was chartered and became the seat of Valdaysky Uyezd of Novgorod Viceroyalty. In 1796, the viceroyalty was transformed into Novgorod Governorate. The area was located along the road connecting Moscow and St. Petersburg, and Valday developed as a major trade center. It also became a pilgrim destination. Between April 1, 1919 and October 1920, the uyezd center was transferred to the town of Bologoye, but soon after it was moved back to Valday again. In December 1926, three of the selsoviets in Valdaysky Uyezd were granted Estonian ethnic status.

In August 1927, the governorates and uyezds were abolished. Valdaysky District, with the administrative center in the town of Valday, was established within Borovichi Okrug of Leningrad Oblast effective October 1, 1927. It included parts of former Valdaysky Uyezd. On July 23, 1930, the okrugs were abolished, and the districts were directly subordinated to the oblast. In 1931, Yakonovsky Selsoviet was granted Karelian ethnic status, but its status was changed back to a regular selsoviet in 1939. The district was not occupied during World War II, although it was located close to the front line. On July 5, 1944, Valdaysky District was transferred to newly established Novgorod Oblast, where it remained ever since.

== Economy ==
=== Industry ===
The industry of the district is predominantly timber industry and food industry. In Valday, there are also enterprises producing optical devices and pumps.

=== Agriculture ===
As of 2011, there were five large-scale farms operating in the district and eighty-five mid-scale farms. The main specializations were meat (beef and poultry) and milk production, fish farming, and growing potatoes.

=== Transportation ===
A railway which connects Bologoye and Pskov via Staraya Russa crosses the district from east to west. The main stations within the district are Valday and Yedrovo. Valday is also connected to Kresttsy with a railway. There is no passenger traffic, but the railway is in use for transporting cargo.

The M10 highway, which connects Moscow and St. Petersburg, crosses the district from southeast to northwest. In particular, Valday is located on that highway. There are road connections from Valday to Okulovka and from Yazhelbitsy to Demyansk. There are also local roads.

Lake Valdayskoye is navigable.

=== Tourism ===
Valdaysky District is a popular tourist destination, situated in the middle of the Valdaysky National Park. Most tourists visit Lake Valdayskoye and the town of Valday during the summer. Valday features many recreational facilities and sanatoria, and many camping places are available around the lake.

== Culture and recreation ==
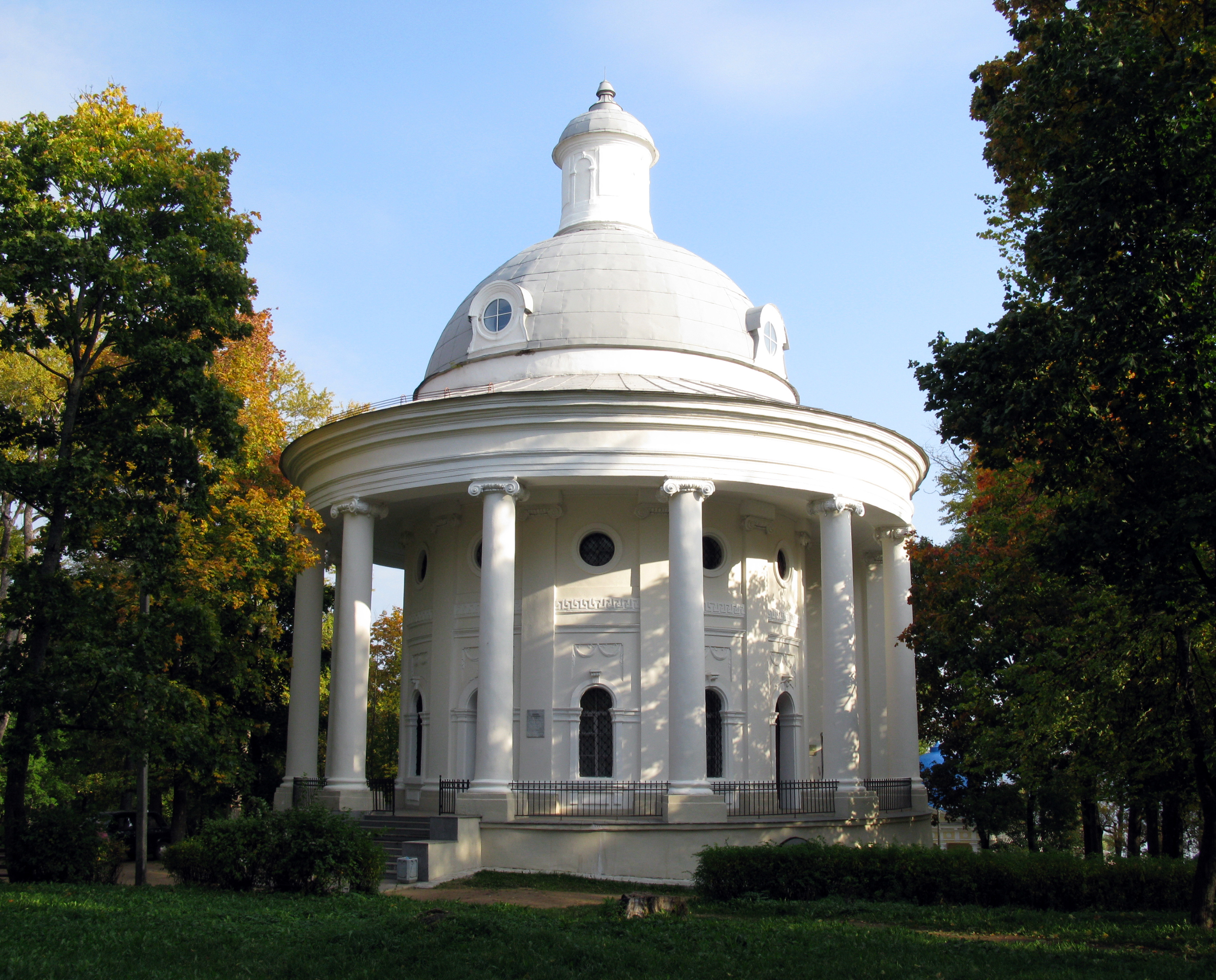
The Church of St. Catherine in Valday currently hosts the Valday Bells Museum

The district contains 51 cultural heritage monuments of federal significance and additionally 329 objects classified as cultural and historical heritage of local significance. The federal monuments are the ensemble of the Valday Iversky Monastery, the Presentation Church and a park in Valday, as well as a number of archaeological sites.

Iversky Monastery was founded by Patriarch Nikon in 1652 and in the 17th century was one of the most influential monasteries in Russia before going into decline in the 18th century.

The Valdaysky District Museum, located in Valday, displays two exhibitions. One is devoted to the history of Valday as a seat of an uyezd in the 19th century. This part of the museum is located in the Mikhaylova House, a 19th-century historical building. The second part, in the former Church of St. Catherine, highlights the history of Valday bell-making. In the end of the 18th and in the 19th century, bell-making was a traditional handicraft in Valday. Big church bells, as well as small bells which were hung to a horse harness, were produced.

== Notable residents ==
- Yakov Pavlov (1917–1981), soldier, Hero of the Soviet Union, born in Krestovaya
- Tikhon of Zadonsk (1724–1783), Russian Orthodox bishop and writer, born in Korotsko
