= Berezayka =

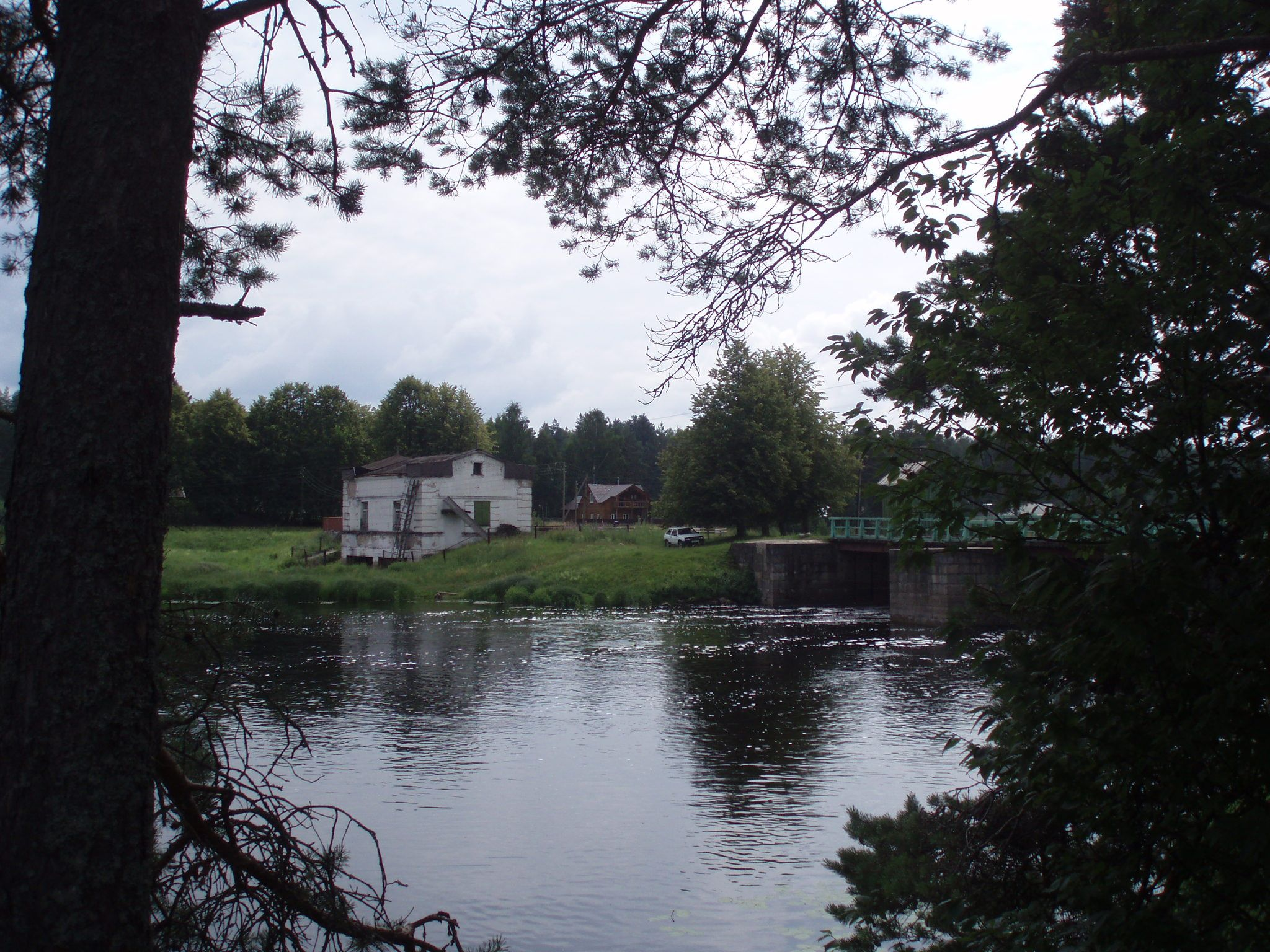

Location
- Country: Russia

Physical characteristics
- Source: Lake Berezay
  - elevation: 205 m (673 ft)
- Mouth: Msta
  - coordinates: 58°05′55″N 34°29′18″E
- Length: 150 km (93 mi)
- Basin size: 3,230 km^{2} (1,250 sq mi)
- Discharge
  - average: 27 m^{3}/s (950 cu ft/s)

Basin features
- Progression: Msta→ Lake Ilmen→ Volkhov→ Lake Ladoga→ Neva→ Gulf of Finland

The Berezayka (Russian: Береза́йка) is a river in Valdaysky District of Novgorod Oblast and Bologovsky District of Tver Oblast of Russia. It is a left tributary of the Msta and belongs to the drainage basin of the Neva and the Baltic Sea. It is 150 kilometres (93 mi) long, and the area of its drainage basin is 3,230 square kilometres (1,250 sq mi). The principal tributary of the Berezayka is the Valdayka (left).

The course of the Berezayka lies in the Valdai Hills. The source of the river is in Lake Berezay. The Berezayka flows north, empties into Lake Kholmskoye, and flows out of this lake to the east. It enters Tver Oblast, flows through a number of lakes, and turns north. It flows through the southeastern part of Lake Piros and turns east. The mouth of the Berezayka is at the village of Berezovsky Ryadok.

The drainage basin of the Berezayka includes major parts of Valdaysky and Bologovsky Districts, as well as minor areas in Okulovsky and Borovichsky Districts of Novgorod Oblast and the urban-type settlement of Ozyorny in Tver Oblast. The towns of Bologoye and Valday lie in the basin of the Berezayka. The basin also includes many lakes of the Valdai Hills, the biggest of which are Lake Valdayskoye, Lake Kaftino, and Lake Piros.

The Berezayka is a popular rafting route.
