= Pola (river) =

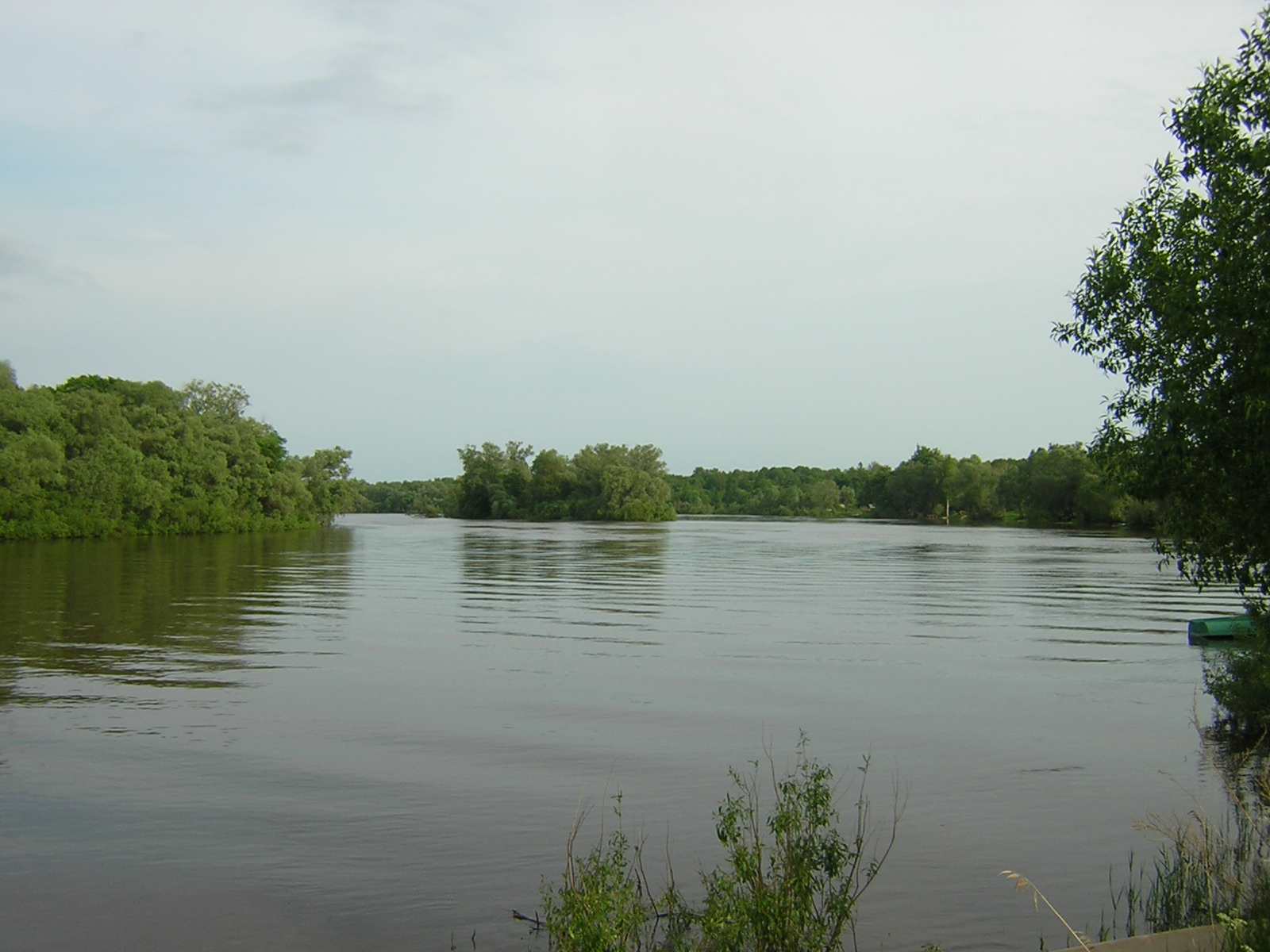
- Pola River near Lake Ilmen
- Native name: Пола (Russian)

Location
- Country: Russia

Physical characteristics
- Source
  - location: Valdai Hills
- Mouth: Lake Ilmen
  - coordinates: 58°12′35″N 31°38′05″E
  - elevation: 18 m (59 ft)
- Length: 267 km (166 mi)
- Basin size: 7,420 km^{2} (2,860 sq mi)
- Discharge
  - average: 63 m^{3}/s (2,200 cu ft/s)

Basin features
- Progression: Lake Ilmen→ Volkhov→ Lake Ladoga→ Neva→ Gulf of Finland

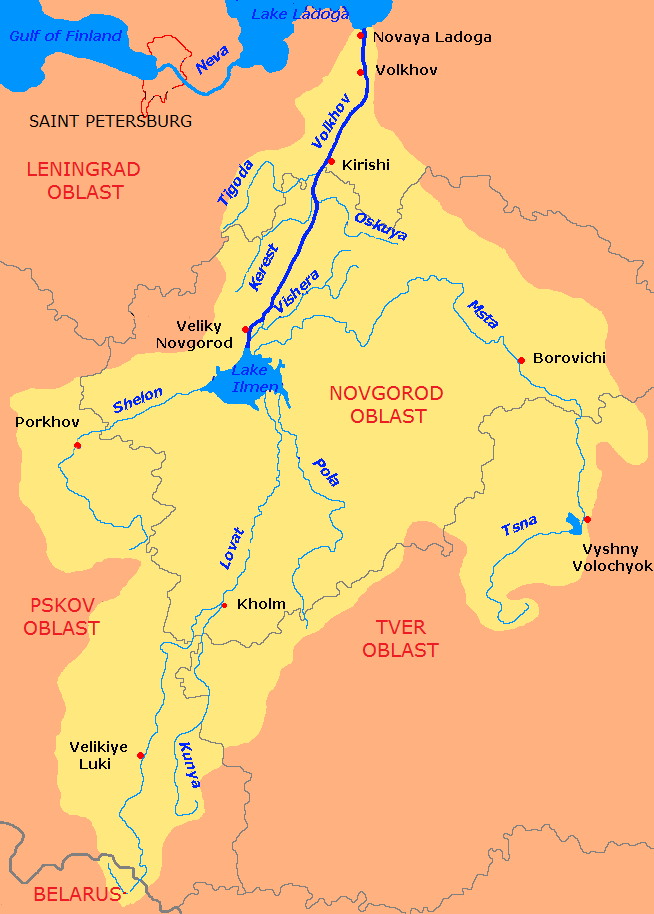
The Volkhov River drainage basin. The Pola is shown on the map.

The Pola (Russian: Пола́) is a river in Andreapolsky and Penovsky Districts of Tver Oblast and Maryovsky, Demyansky, and Parfinsky Districts of Novgorod Oblast in Russia. It is a tributary of Lake Ilmen. It is 267 kilometres (166 mi) long, and the area of its basin 74,200 square kilometres (28,600 sq mi). The principal tributaries of the Pola are the Maryovka, Kamenka, Yavon, and Polomet rivers, all from the right.

The source of the Pola is located in the Valdai Hills, at the border between Andreapolsky and Penovsky Districts of Tver Oblast, southwest of the village of Pyatygino. It flows north, making the border between these districts, and enters Novgorod Oblast. The Pola accepts the Maryovka River from the right and turns east, then it accepts the Kamenka River from the right and turns north. In the village of Veliky Zavod the river makes a loop, and at the tip of the loop, in the village of Novoye Sokhnovo, it accepts the Yavon River from the right. In Novoye Sokhnovo the Pola turns west and in the village of Kostkovo it accepts the Polomet River, also from the right. Downstream from the mouth of the Polomet, the Pola turns northwest. Close to Lake Ilmen, the Pola shares a river delta with the Lovat and the Polist.

The Pola provides the main drain from the northwestern slope of the Valdai Hills to the river basin of the Neva. In particular, many of the lakes in Valdaysky and Demyansky Districts of Novgorod Oblast drain into the Pola. The source and the upper course of the Polomet, the major tributary of the Pola, is located in Valdaysky National Park. Along with the Msta, the Lovat, the Polist, and the Shelon, the Pola is a principal tributary of Lake Ilmen.

The several lowest kilometers of the course of the Pola are listed in the State Water Register of Russia as navigable.
