= Lake Seliger =

Lake system in Tver and Novgorod oblasts, Russia

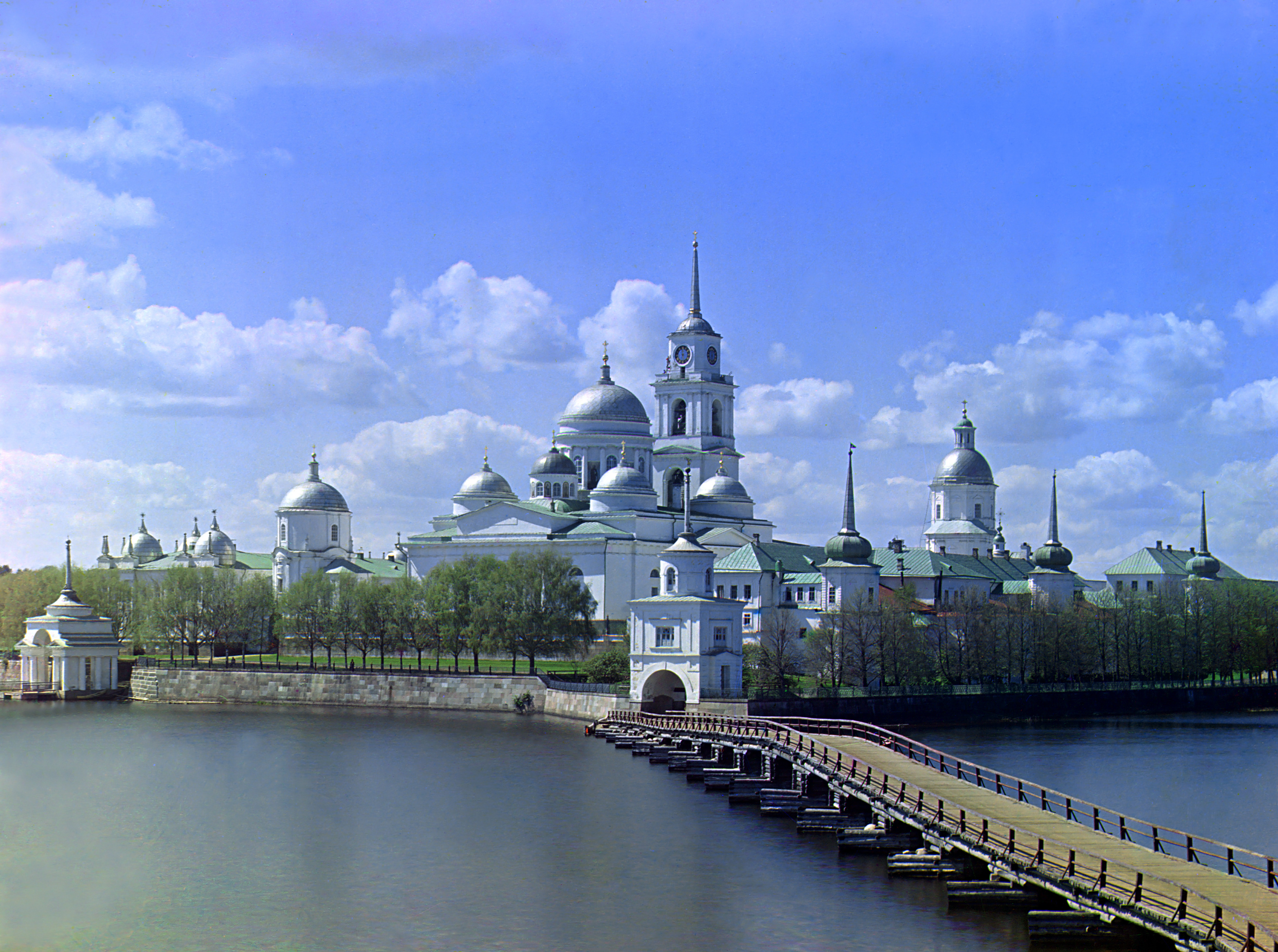
- View of Nilov Monastery on Stolobny Island, Lake Seliger, c. 1910, by Sergey Prokudin-Gorsky

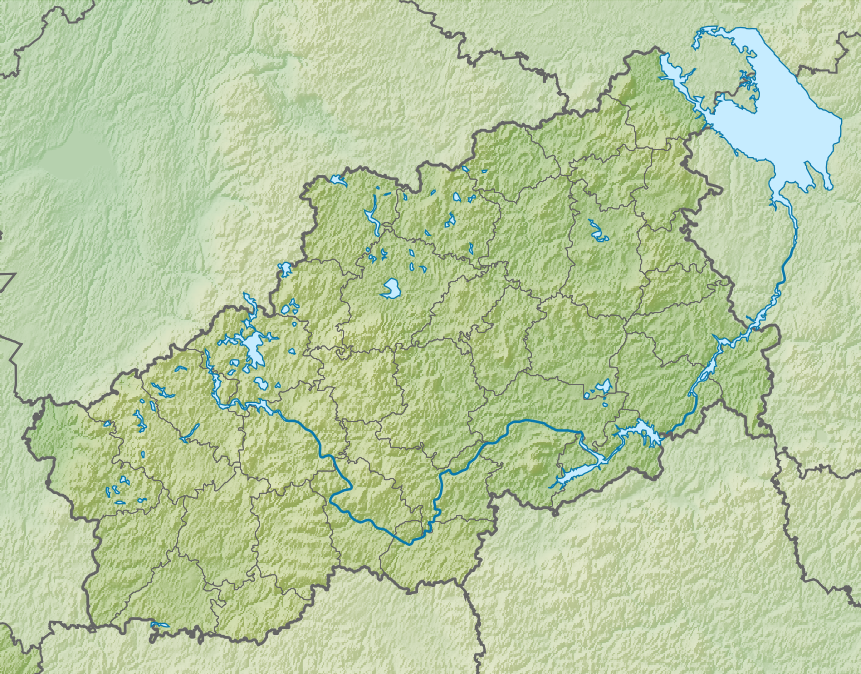
- Location within Tver Oblast Location within European Russia
- Coordinates: 57°11′31″N 33°04′20″E
- Basin countries: Russia
- Surface area: 212 square kilometres (82 mi^{2})
- Average depth: 5.8 m (19 ft)
- Surface elevation: 205 m (673 ft)
- Islands: 160
- Settlements: Ostashkov

Seliger (Russian: Селиге́р, IPA: [sʲɪlʲɪˈgʲer]) is a lake in Ostashkovsky District of Tver Oblast and (in the extreme northern part) in Demyansky District of Novgorod Oblast of Russia, in the northwest of the Valdai Hills, a part of the Volga basin. It has an absolute height of 205 metres (673 ft), an area of 212 square kilometres (82 mi^{2}), and an average depth of 5.8 metres (19 ft).

Lake Seliger is a large system of bodies of water linked by channels, has many small islands, and is surrounded by forests - including pine woods with many berries and mushrooms. It is one of the biggest natural lakes of Central Russia. The only outflow of the lake, the Selizharovka River, flows from the southern end of the lake and drains into the Volga after 36 kilometres (22 mi). The drainage basin of the lake includes the major part of Ostashkovsky District, the south of Demyansky District, as well as minor areas in the Firovsky District of Tver Oblast.

Seliger is situated within a picturesque landscape of forests and hills. The lake is a protected nature reserve of the Tver Oblast (Russian: охраняемая природная территория Тверской области) and "seasoned travellers" refer to it as the "European Baikal" due to the diversity of its unique flora and fauna, similar to Lake Baikal. Valdaysky National Park covers the northern part of the lake.

Every year, Seliger camp forums bring together young people to study and discuss issues in political science, economics, art, literature and culture.

Ostashkov, the only town on the lake, is one of the most popular resorts in central Russia. The Nilo-Stolobensky Monastery is located on Stolobny Island. The closed urban-type settlement of Solnechny, a military base, occupies Gorodomlya Island.

== Travel and tourism ==
Seliger lakes offers a number of accommodations for tourists. Many places are surrounded by untouched nature.

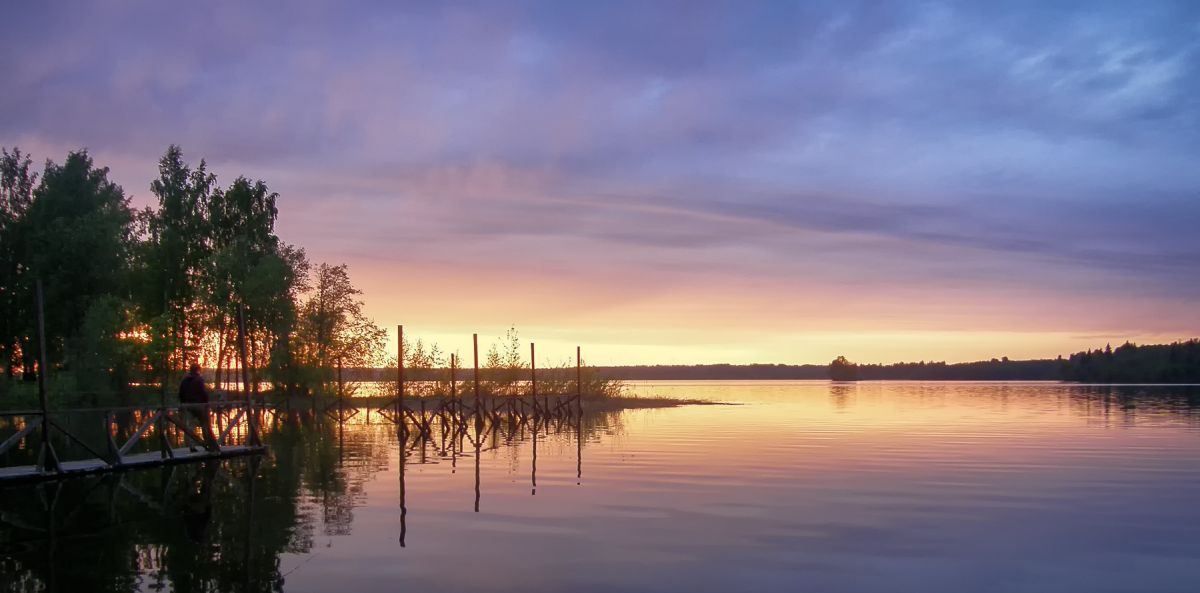
Sunset at Seliger lakes

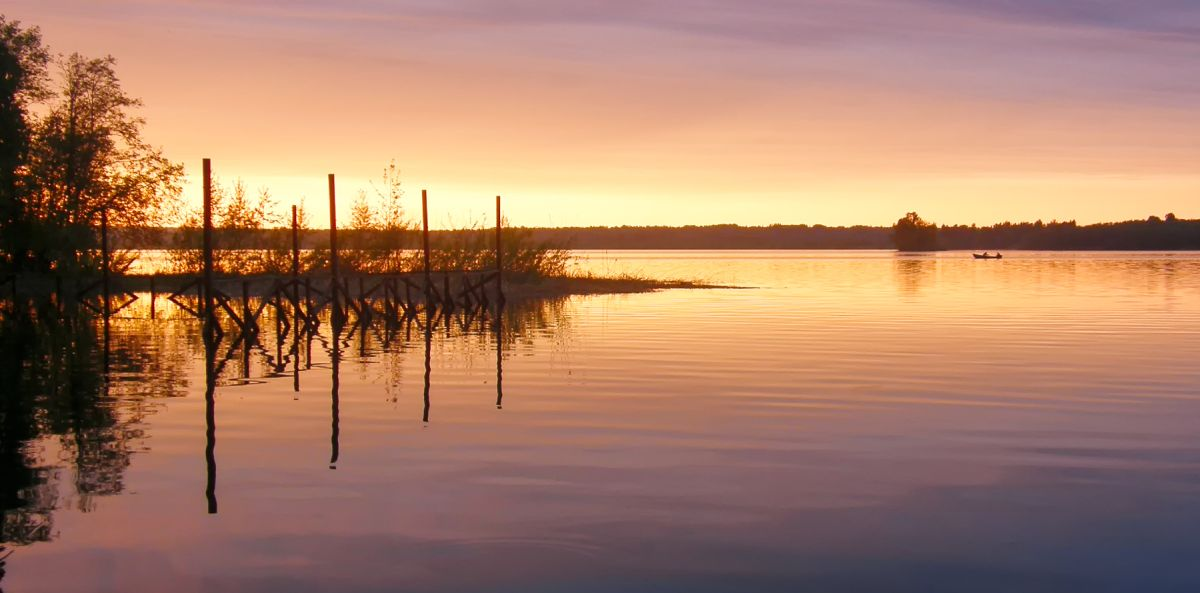
Sunset at Seliger lakes

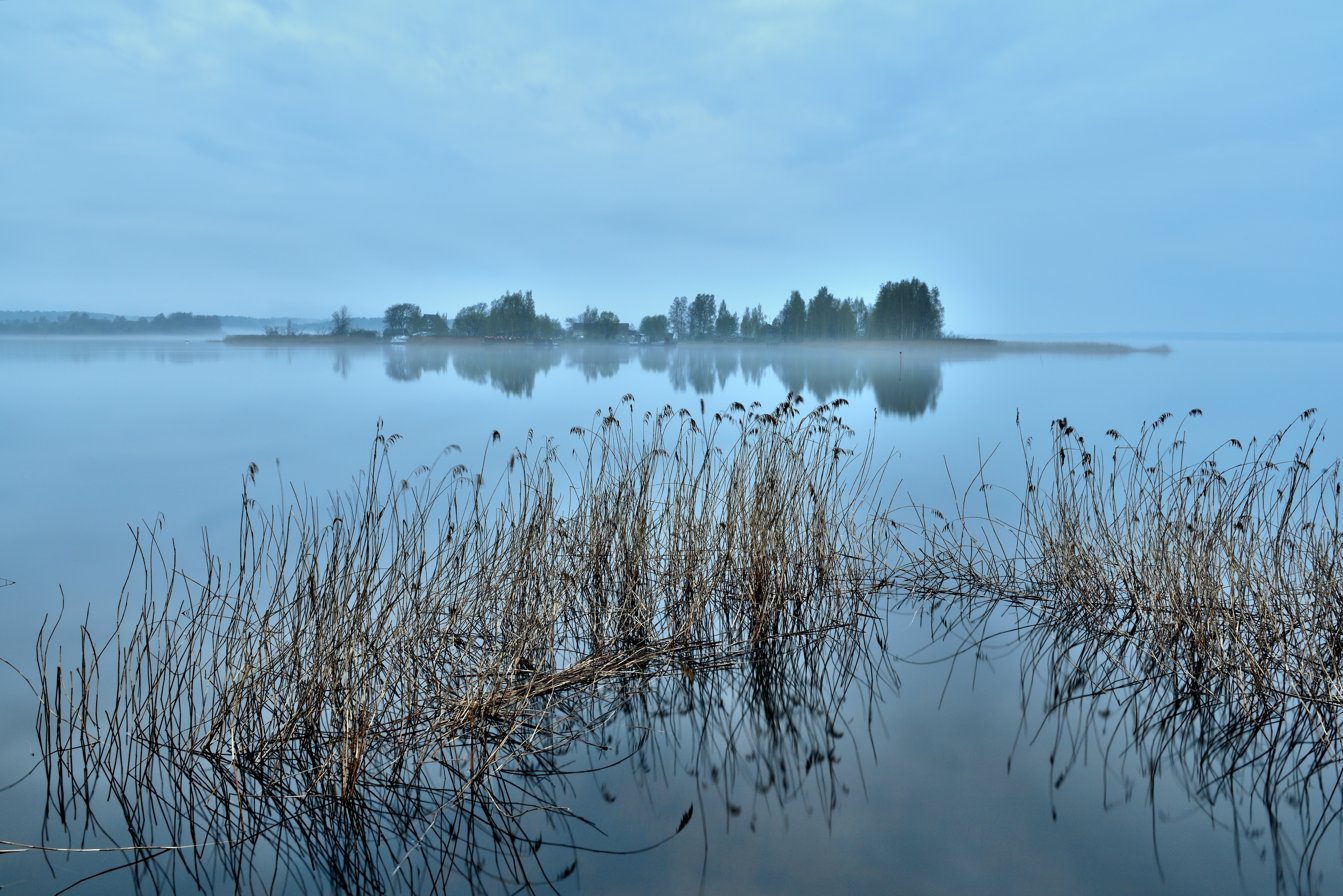
Lake Seliger. Ostashkov. View of the island of Voroniy on a foggy morning

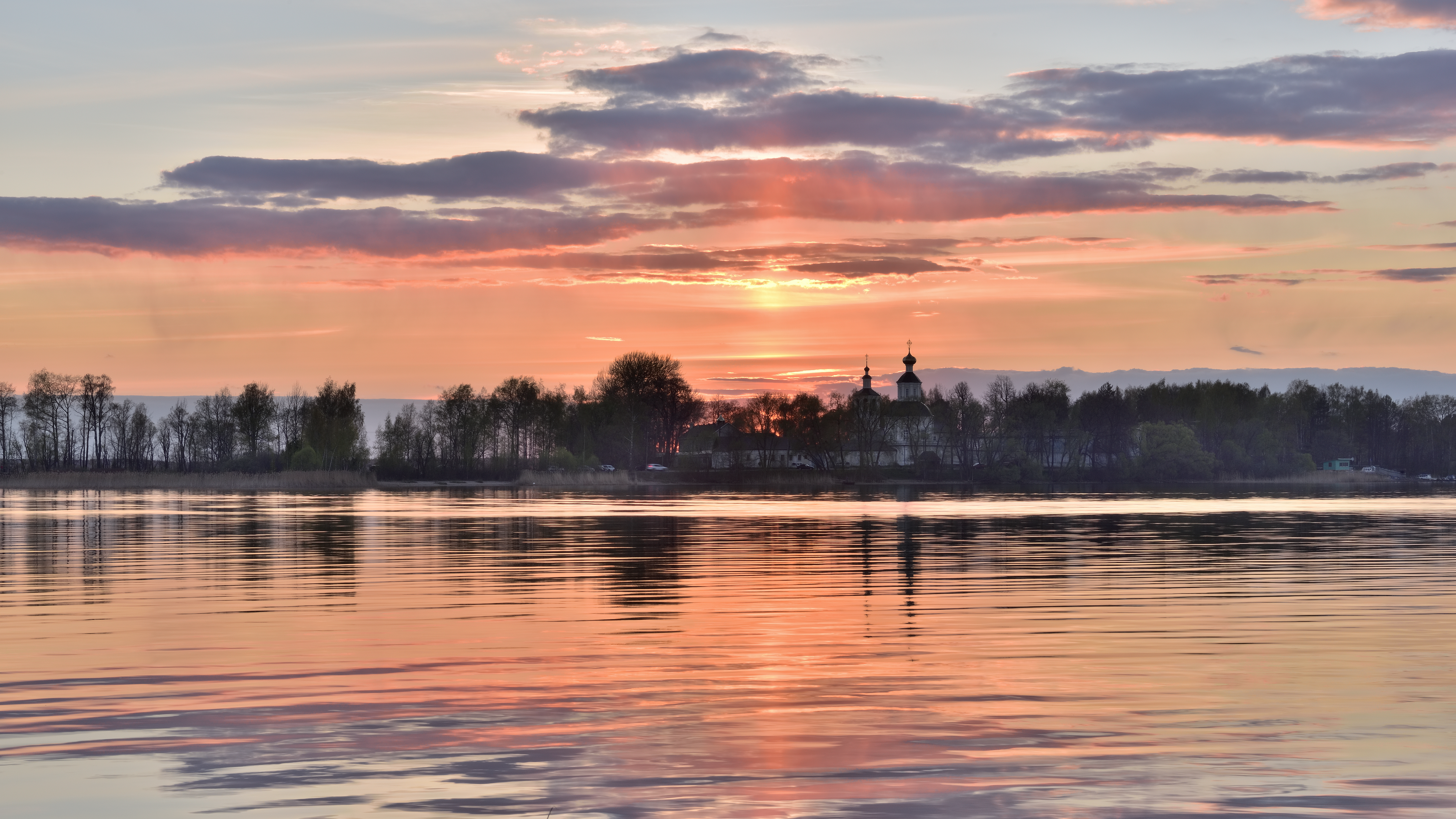
Spring sunset over Lake Seliger
