= Valday Iversky Monastery =

Coordinates: 57°59′19″N 33°18′15″E

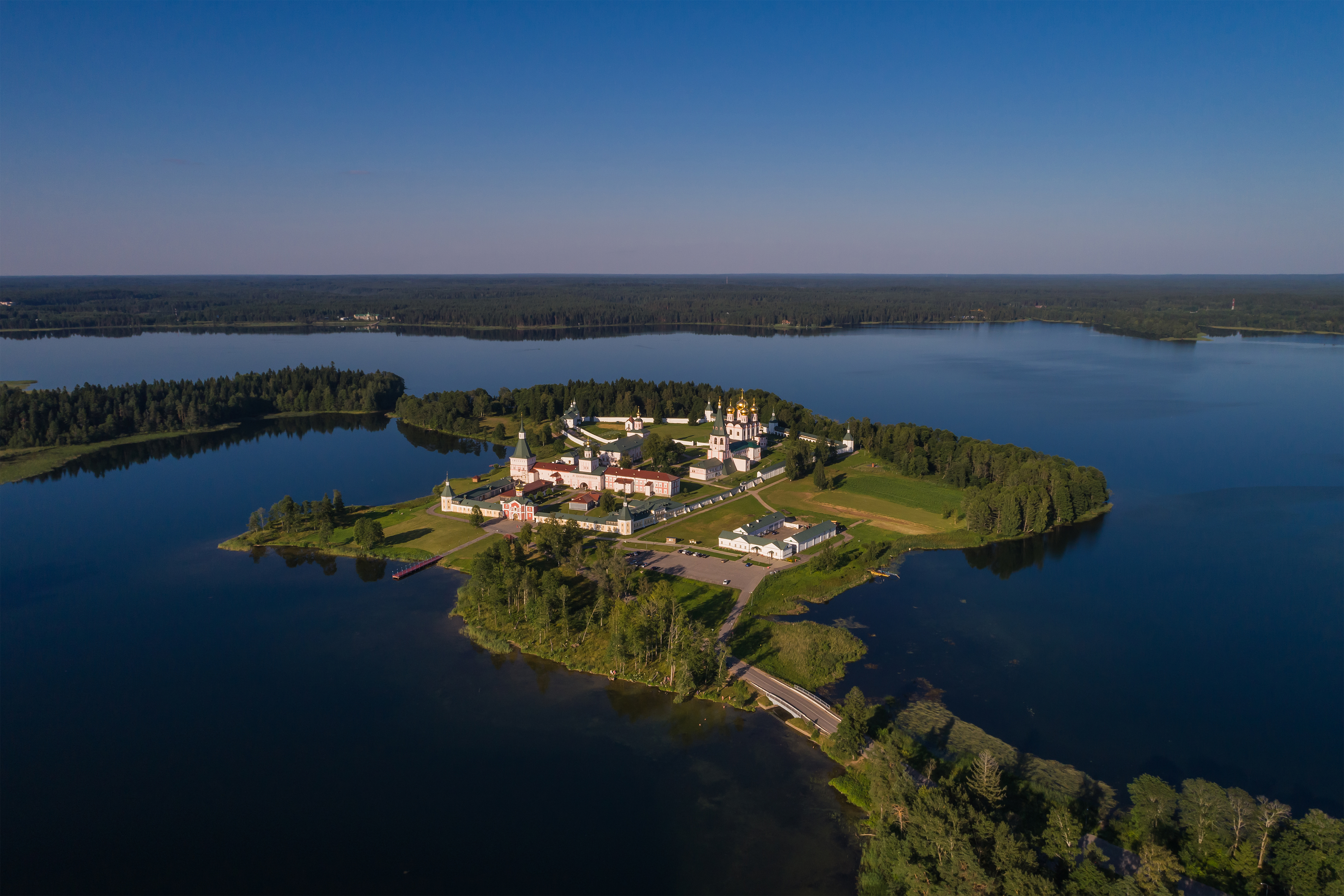
- Aerial view of the monastery
- Interactive map of Valday Iversky Monastery

Monastery information
- Full name: Valday Iversky Svyatoozersky Virgin Monastery
- Order: Russian Orthodox Church
- Established: 1653, 1668, 1991
- Disestablished: 1666, 1927
- Diocese: Novgorod and Staraya Russa Eparchy

People
- Founder: Patriarch Nikon

Site
- Location: Lake Valdayskoye, Novgorod Oblast, Russia
- Public access: Yes

Valday Iversky Monastery (Russian: Валдайский Иверский монастырь) is a Russian Orthodox monastery founded by Patriarch Nikon in 1653. The monastery is located on an island in Lake Valdayskoye in Valdaysky District of Novgorod Oblast, Russia, close to the town of Valday. In the 17th century, the Valday Iversky Monastery was one of the most influential monasteries in Russia and a significant cultural center.

The monastery derives its name from the Iviron Monastery on Mount Athos in northeastern Greece. In the Valday Iversky Monastery, a copy of the icon of Theotocos Iverskaya was kept until the 1920s, when it disappeared. The name of the Iveron Monastery, in its turn, originates from Iberia, an ancient Georgian kingdom.

== History ==
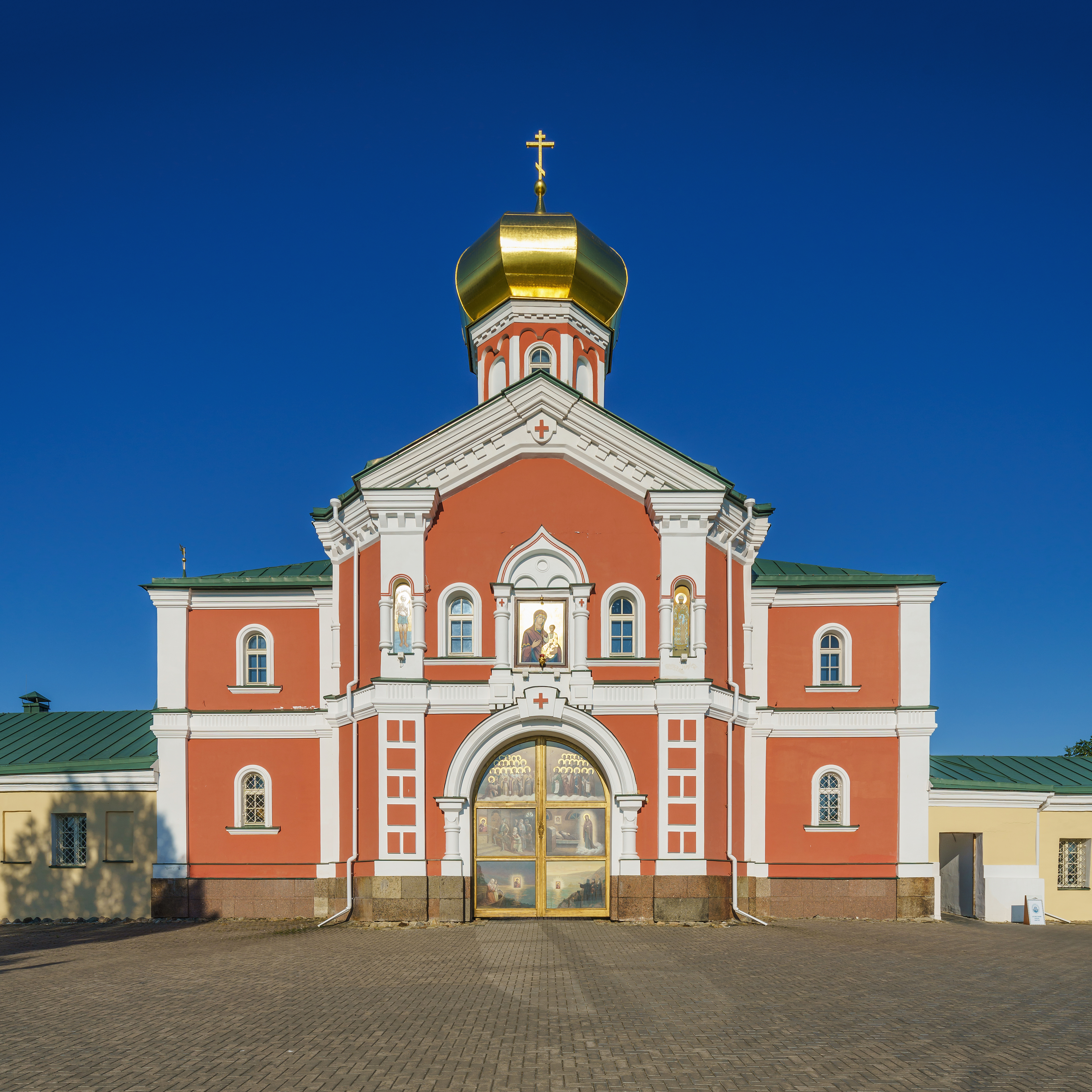
The gate church

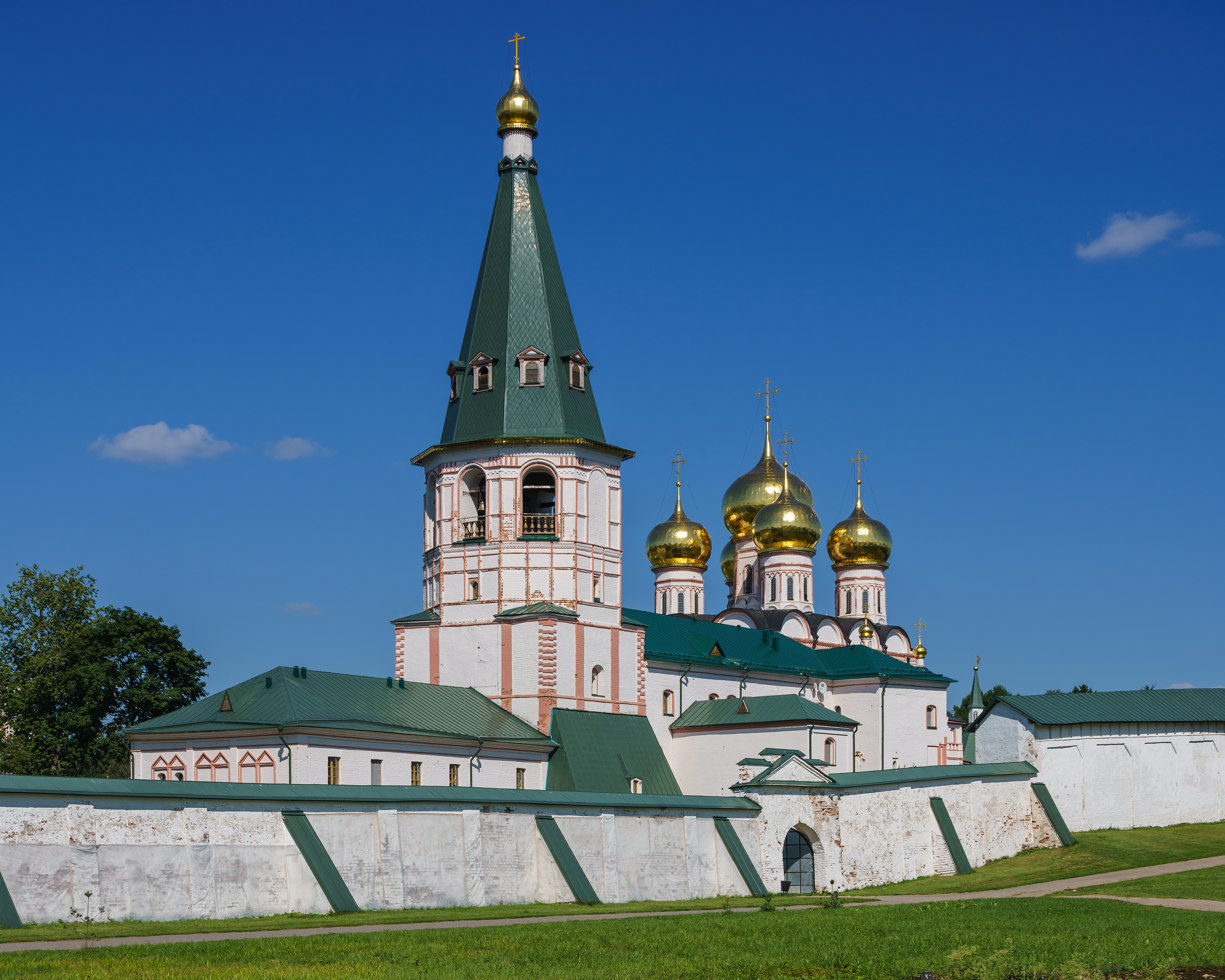
Bell tower, and Cathedral of Our Lady of the Iberian

Nikon was elected Patriarch in 1652, and in 1653, he asked Tsar Alexey II permission to found a monastery in Valday. By the autumn of 1653, two wooden churches were in use. Nikon also ordered to transfer the relic of Saint Iosif of Borovichi to the monastery, which was done in February, 1654. In the same year, all lands around Lake Valdayskoye, including the selos of Valday, Borovichi, and Vyshny Volochyok, were declared the property of the monastery. The monastery became one of the biggest landowners in Russia.

In 1655, all monks from the former Orsha Kutein Monastery, located in the area of the present-day Belarus, moved to the Valday Iversky Monastery. One monk, Dionisy, was appointed a hegumen. This move was related to a difficult situation of the Orthodox Church in Poland.

In the second half of the 17th century, the monastery became a center of culture and education. In particular, the monastery started to print books, the second such institution in Russia after the Moscow Print Yard. Production of porcelain tiles, the first one in Russia, started in the monastery. In 1656, the first stone church was completed. Nikon, as well as a number of metropolitans, personally attended the sanctification. For this occasion, a copy of the icon of Theotocos Iverskaya was made and placed in the monastery. Simultaneously, Nikon issued a prohibition to make further copies of the icon.

In 1666, Nikon was deposed, and all monasteries he supervised, including the Iversky monastery, were abolished. However, already in 1668 the monastery was re-established, and the former monks, including the hegumen, Filofey, returned.

In the 18th century, the monastery slowly declined. Between 1712 and 1730, it was subordinated to the Alexander Nevsky Lavra, located in Saint Petersburg. Much of the treasure kept in the Valday Iversky Monastery was transferred to the Lavra. An attempt to revive the former importance of the monastery was made in the 1850s. After the October Revolution, the monastery was first transformed into a labour cooperative in 1919, and in 1927, it was abolished. The monastery buildings housed a museum, a workshop, a hospital, a retirement home, and a recreation facility. The icon of the Theotocos Iverskaya disappeared in 1927 and was never recovered.

In 1991, the monastery was reopened. In the Peter and Paul Cathedral in Valday, a copy of the icon of the Theotocos Iverskaya, dating from 1854, survived. This copy was transferred to the monastery and remains there.

== Architecture ==
The construction of the monastery started in the 1650s. The oldest stone church built in the monastery (1656), the Assumption Cathedral, remains intact. Much of the ensemble of the monastery was created in the 1670s by a local architect, Afanasy Fomin. From this period, the Cathedral of the Epiphany, the Church of Archangel Michael, the St. Michael Tower, and the hegumen's chamber remain. The walls and the remaining towers were built at later periods.

== List of hegumens ==
The years of appointment and retirement/death for some hegumens are unknown or approximated.

- Iakov (1653)
- Ioil (1653–1654)
- Dionisy I (1654–1655)
- Dionisy II (1655–1658)
- Iosif I (1658–1660)
- Filofey (1660–1669)
- Feodosy (1669–1672)
- Yevmeny (1672–1681)
- Iosif II (1683? – 1692)
- Feognost (1692–1693)
- Antony I
- Tarasy I
- Aaron
- Veniamin I
- Filaret (1731–?)
- Serafim
- Avraamy (? – 1734)
- Trifily (1747 – ?)
- Damaskin Askaronsky (1751–1758)
- Pakhomy Dobrynya (1758–1769)
- Viktor Onisimov (1770–1775)
- Tarasy II Verbitsky (1775–1778)
- Dorofey (1778–1783)
- Amvrosy I Andriyevsky (1783–1791)
- Nikolay Kizhdobryansky (1791–1795)
- Innokenty Dubravitsky (1795–1796)
- Antony Znamensky (1797–?)
- Feofilakt Rusanov (1799)
- Iustin Vishnevsky (1799–1800)
- Amvrosy Protasov (1800–?)
- Parfeny Pakhomov (1802–?)
- Flavian Laskin (1804–1807)
- Yevgraf Platonov Muzalevsky (1808–1809)
- Veniamin II Zhukov (1809–1811)
- Amvrosy III Kalos (1811–1816)
- Vladimir Uzhinsky (1816–1819)
- Gedeon (1819–1822)
- Gerasim Gaydukov (1822–1829)
- Arseny Kayzerov (1829–1840):
- Innokenty II Areshnikov (1840–1847)
- Pyotr (1848–1851)
- Iriney (1851–1853)
- Illarion (1853–1854)
- Lavrenty Makarov (1854–1874)
- Veniamin III Pozdnyakov (1874–1877)
- Amvrosy Klimenko (1877–1883)
- Leonid Ilyashkevich (1884–?)
- Amvrosy (1903–?)
- Iosif (1906–?)
- Stefan (1991–1997)
- Yefrem Barbinyagra (1997–2002)
- Nil Mikhaylov (2002)
- Nikandr Stepanov (2002–2007)
- Yefrem Barbinyagra (2007–2012)
- Antony Bitmayev (since 2012)
