= Lykoshino =

Lykoshino (Russian: Лыкошино) is the name of several rural localities in Russia:

- Lykoshino (settlement), Bologovsky District, Tver Oblast, a settlement in Bologovsky District of Tver Oblast
- Lykoshino (village), Bologovsky District, Tver Oblast, a village in Bologovsky District of Tver Oblast
- Lykoshino, Lesnoy District, Tver Oblast, a village in Lesnoy District of Tver Oblast
- Lykoshino, Danilovsky District, Yaroslavl Oblast, a village in Danilovsky District of Yaroslavl Oblast
- Lykoshino, Tutayevsky District, Yaroslavl Oblast, a village in Tutayevsky District of Yaroslavl Oblast

== See also ==
- Lykoshina, a village in Sorokinsky District of Tyumen Oblast
