= Demyansk =

Demyansk Демянск
- Urban-type settlement
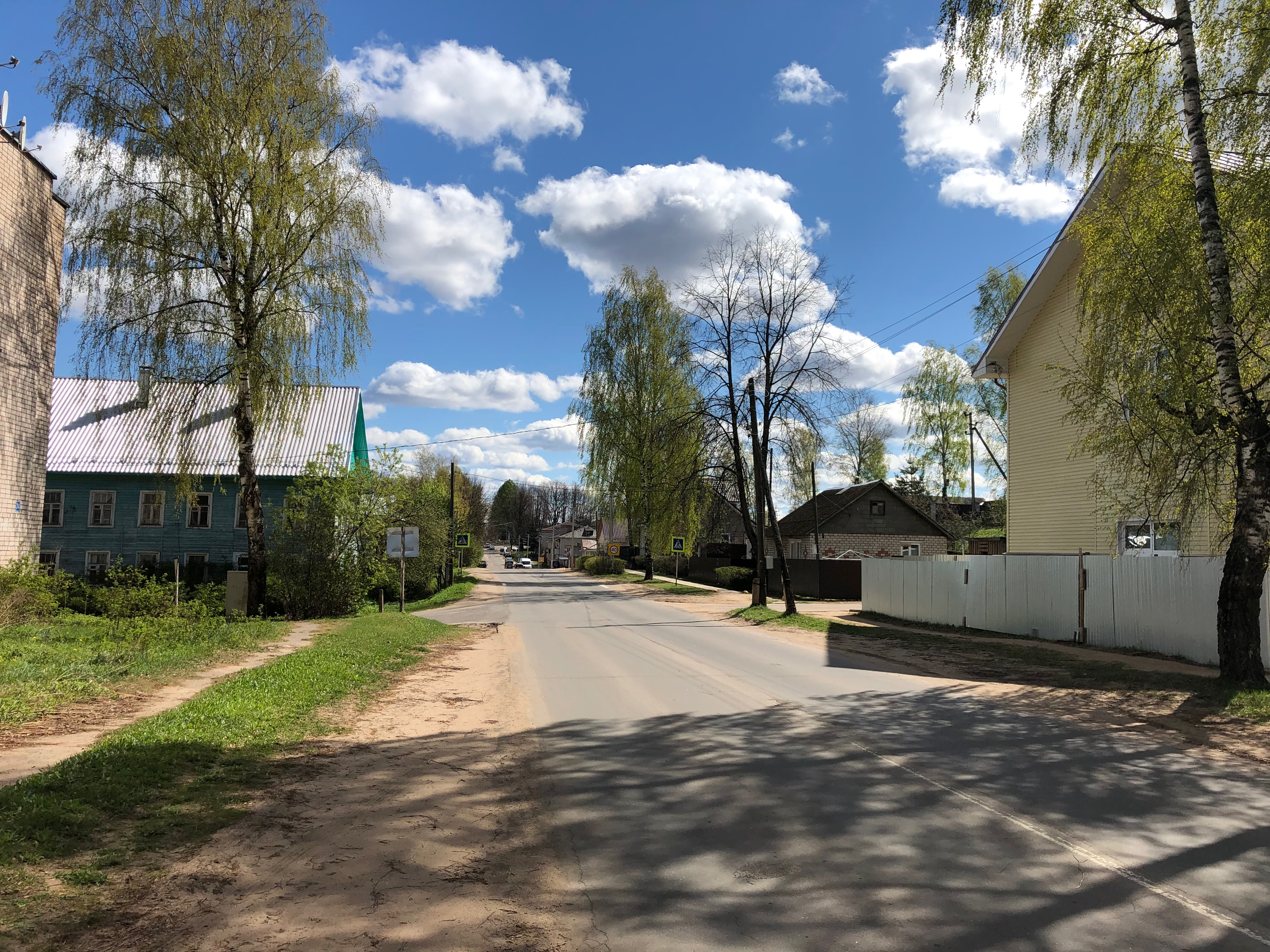
- Demyansk

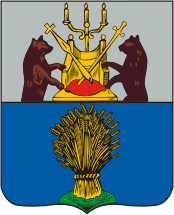
- Coat of arms
- Interactive map of Demyansk
- Location of Demyansk Demyansk (Novgorod Oblast)
- Coordinates: 57°39′N 32°28′E
- Country: Russia
- Federal subject: Novgorod Oblast
- Administrative district: Demyansky District
- First mentioned: 1406
- Urban-type settlement status since: December 28, 1960

Population (2010 Census)
  - Total: 5,365
  - Estimate (2025): 4,368 (−18.6%)

Administrative status
  - Capital of: Demyansky District

Municipal status
  - Municipal district: Demyansky Municipal District
  - Urban settlement: Demyanskoye Urban Settlement
  - Capital of: Demyansky Municipal District, Demyanskoye Urban Settlement
- Time zone: UTC+3 (MSK)
- Postal code: 175310
- OKTMO ID: 49612151051

Demyansk (Russian: Демя́нск) is an urban locality (a work settlement) and the administrative center of Demyansky District of Novgorod Oblast, Russia, located along the Yavon River. Municipally, it is incorporated as Demyanskoye Urban Settlement, the only urban settlement in the district. Population: 5,365 (2010 census); 5,825 (2002 census); 5,999 (1989 Soviet census).

== History ==
Demyansk was first mentioned in a chronicle in 1406 as Demon. The area was a part of Derevskaya Pyatina of Novgorod. Demon was a fortress protecting a waterway from Lake Ilmen upstream the Pola and the Yavon to Lake Seliger. The fortress was located close to the boundary between the Novgorod Republic and the Grand Duchy of Moscow, and it was at least twice sieged by Muscovite troops. In 1441, the Muscovites did not manage to conquer Demon, but in the 1470s they conquered and destroyed the fortress. After the subsequent fall of Novgorod, Demon was transferred to the Grand Duchy of Moscow. In the 17th century, Demon went into decline, and a new settlement was founded nearby, which was known as Demyansky Pogost, and later as Demyansk. In the course of the administrative reform carried out in 1708 by Peter the Great, the area was included into Ingermanland Governorate (known since 1710 as Saint Petersburg Governorate). In 1727, separate Novgorod Governorate was split off. Between 1772 and 1824, Demyansk was a part of Starorussky Uyezd of Novgorod Viceroyalty (since 1796 of Novgorod Governorate). In 1824, it was chartered and became the center of Demyansky Uyezd, which was split off Starorussky Uyezd.

On August 1, 1927, the uyezds were abolished, and Demyansky District was established, with the center in Demyansk. Demyansk belonged to Novgorod Okrug of Leningrad Oblast. Effective October 1, 1927 the town of Demyansk was made a selo. On July 23, 1930 the okrugs were abolished, and the districts became directly subordinate to the oblast. Between September, 1941, and February, 1943 parts of Demyansk District were occupied by German troops. The settlement was a place for the Battle of Demyansk during World War II in 1942. On July 5, 1944, Demyansky District was transferred to newly established Novgorod Oblast and remained there ever since. On December 28, 1960 Demyansk was granted the urban-type settlement status.

== Economy ==
=== Industry ===
The existing enterprises in Demyansk serve timber and food industries.

=== Transportation ===
Demyansk is located on the road connecting Yazhelbitsy and Staraya Russa. There are also local roads. There is bus traffic originating from Demyansk.

== Culture and recreation ==
Demyansk contains thirteen objects classified as cultural and historical heritage of local significance. These include a number of pre-1917 buildings of the former uyezd center, including a prison, an archaeological monument, and a number of graves of soldiers fallen in World War II.

Demyansk hosts the Demyansky District Museum.
