= Yazhelbitsy =

Village in Novgorod Oblast, Russia

Yazhelbitsy Яжелбицы
- Selo
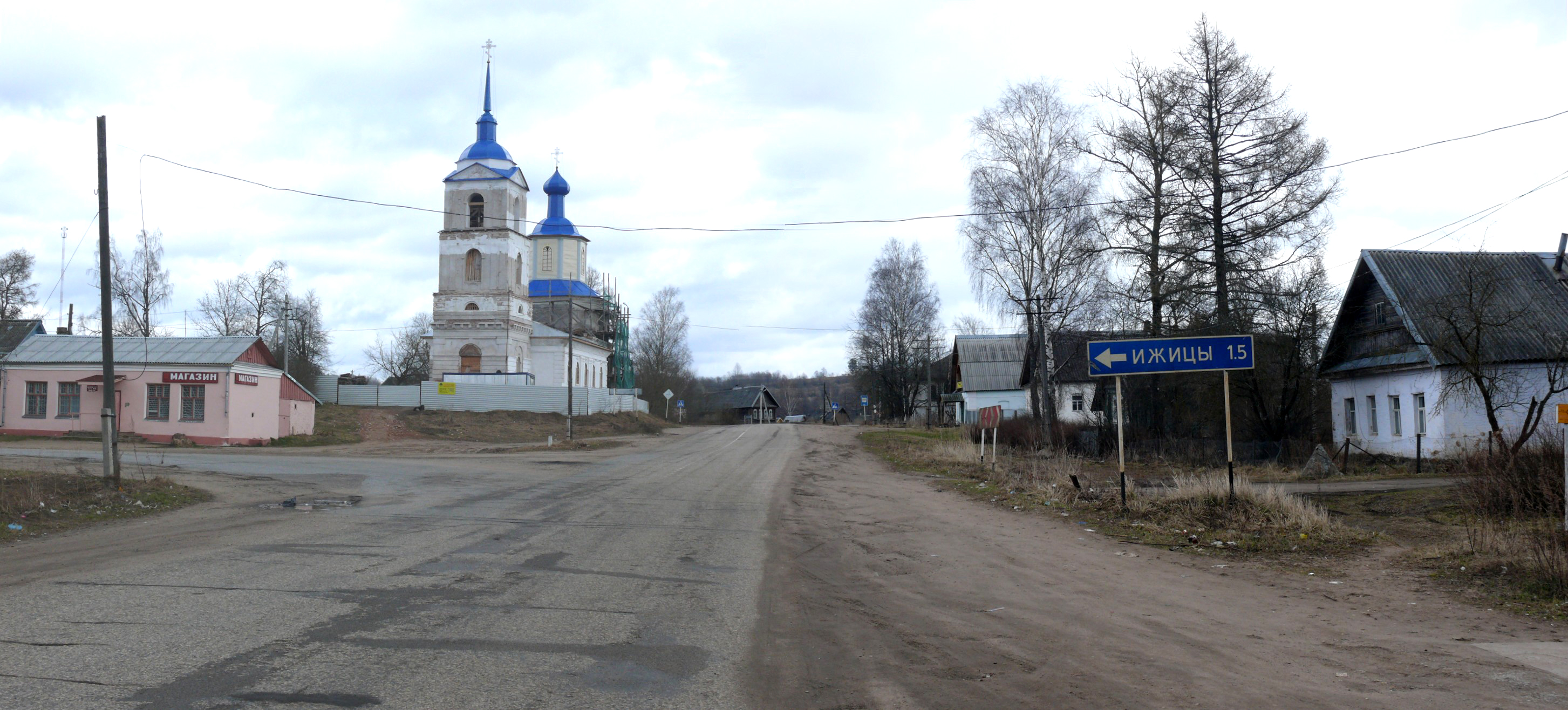
- View of the village, April 2010
- Interactive map of Yazhelbitsy
- Location of Yazhelbitsy Yazhelbitsy (Novgorod Oblast)
- Coordinates: 58°02′N 32°58′E
- Country: Russia
- Federal subject: Novgorod Oblast

Population
  - Estimate (2010): 1,402 )

Administrative status
  - Capital of: Yazhelbitsky Rural Settlement

Municipal status
  - Municipal district: Valdaysky District
- Time zone: UTC+3 (MSK)
- Postal code: 175411
- Dialing code: +7 81666
- OKTMO ID: 49608449101

Yazhelbitsy (Russian: Яжелбицы) is a village (selo) in Valdaysky District of Novgorod Oblast, Russia, located on the M 10 highway 75 miles (121 km) south-east of Veliky Novgorod.

It was the site of the 1456 Treaty of Yazhelbitsy between Grand Prince Vasily II (r. 1425–1462) and Novgorod the Great, in which Novgorod's political independence was strictly curtailed. Failure to abide by the treaty led to Novgorod's defeat at Shelon River in 1471 and its final subjugation by Moscow in 1478.
