= Demyansky Uyezd =

Subdivision of the Novgorod Governorate of the Russian Empire

Demyansky Uyezd (Демянский уезд) was one of the subdivisions of the Novgorod Governorate of the Russian Empire. It was situated in the southwestern part of the governorate. Its administrative centre was Demyansk.

== Demographics ==
At the time of the Russian Empire Census of 1897, Demyansky Uyezd had a population of 79,791. Of these, 98.2% spoke Russian, 0.8% Estonian, 0.7% Karelian, 0.1% Romani, 0.1% Yiddish and 0.1% German as their native language.
