= Lake Valdayskoye =

Lake in Russia

Valdai Lake
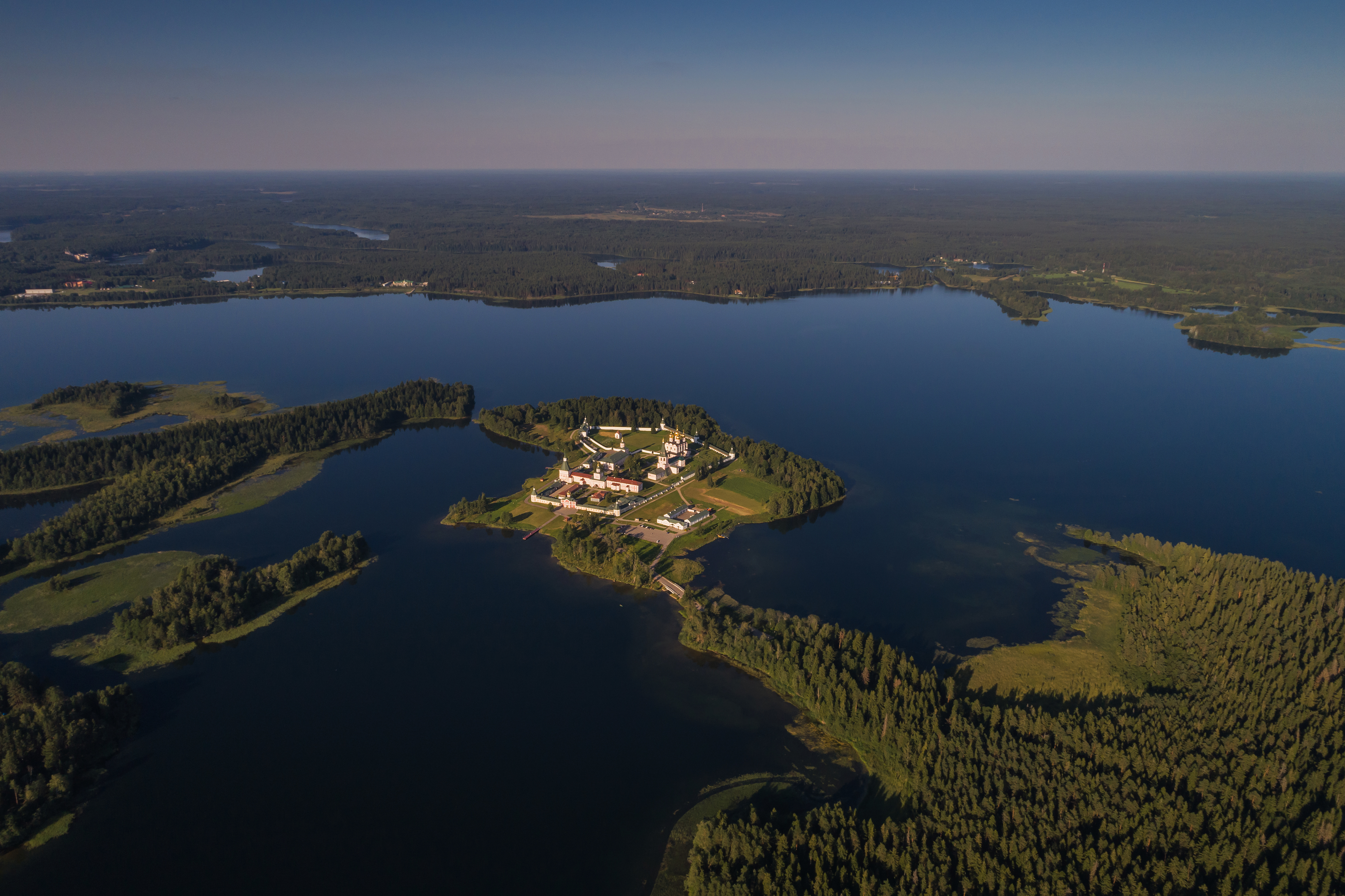
- Aerial view of Lake Valdayskoye

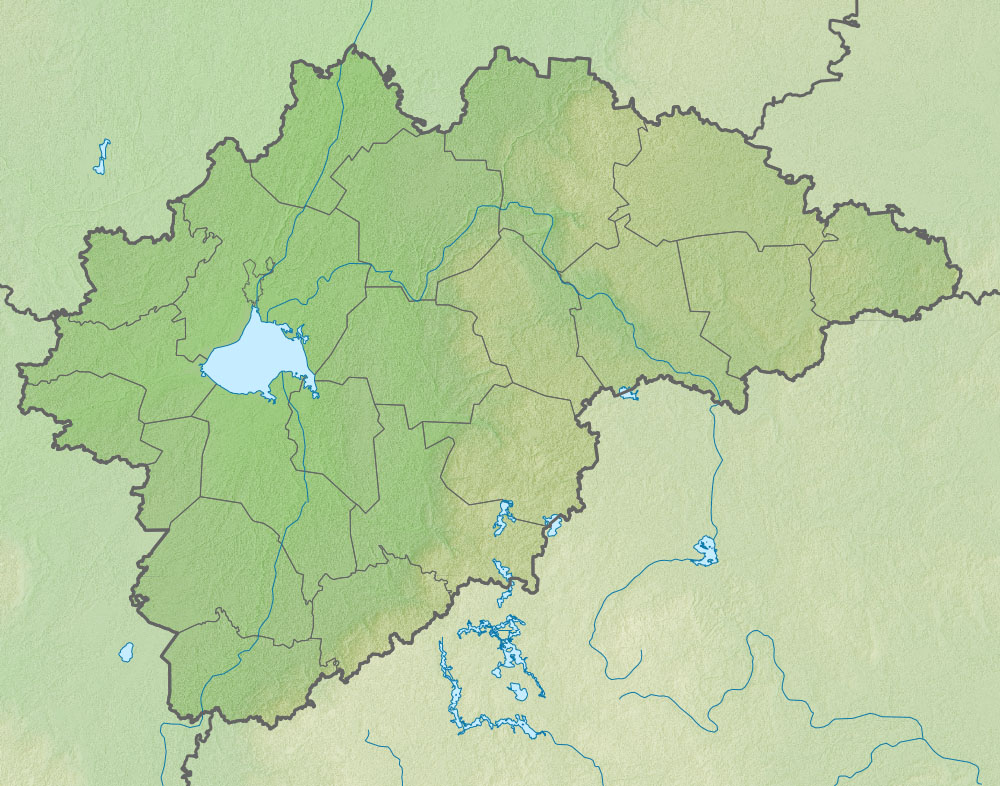
- Location within Novgorod Oblast Location within European Russia
- Location: Valdai Hills, Novgorod Oblast
- Coordinates: 57°59′15″N 33°17′42″E
- Catchment area: 97.2 km^{2} (37.5 mi^{2})
- Basin countries: Russia
- Surface area: 19.7 km^{2} (7.6 mi^{2})
- Average depth: 12 m (39 ft)
- Max. depth: 60 m (200 ft)
- Settlements: Valday

Lake Valdayskoye or Lake Valdai (Russian: Валдайское озеро, озеро Валдай, romanized: ozero Valdai) is a freshwater lake in the center of the Valdaysky District of Novgorod Oblast in Russia, in the middle of the Valdai Hills. One of the largest lakes in Novgorod Oblast, it has a surface area (without islands) of 19.7 km^{2} (7.6 mi^{2}), and the area of its basin is 97.2 km^{2} (37.5 mi^{2}). The average depth of Lake Valdayskoye is 12 m (39 ft) and the deepest point is 60 m (200 ft). The lake freezes up in early December and stays icebound until early May. The lake is in the center of Valdaysky National Park.

== Geography ==
The town of Valday stands on the southwestern shore of the lake along the M10 Moscow – St. Petersburg highway. One of the islands, Selvitsky Island (Russian: Остров Сельвицкий), is occupied by the Valday Iversky Monastery. Besides Valday, there are also several villages around the lake. An anabranch connects Lake Valdai to a smaller lake, Lake Uzhin (Russian: озеро Ужин). Lake Uzhin, the source of the Valdayka River, belongs to the river basin of the Msta River and thus to the Baltic Sea basin.

The lake has almost a round shape with a large bay appended to it on the northwest end. There are several islands on the lake, the biggest of which is the 119 ha (290-acre) Ryabinovy Island (Russian: Остров Рябиновый). It is connected to the lake coast in the south and to Iversky Monastery in the north.

Lake Valdayskoye is located in the center of the Valdai Hills, and is surrounded by many other lakes. Many of these lakes drain into Lake Valdayskoye or into the Valdayka. The basin of the lake comprises all of the northeastern part of Valdaysky District.

The lake is a popular tourist destination, with many recreation facilities on its shores. The first meeting of the Valdai Discussion Club took place on the lake in 2004.

The lake is navigable, and the Zarya-211 (Russian: «Заря-211») cruiser ship sailed between the town of Valday and the Iversky Monastery until 2016.

Since 2004, a road from Valday runs along the shore of Lake Valdai and over a 140 m (460 ft) bridge to Ryabinovy Island, and then over a 30 m (98 ft) bridge to the monastery on 11 ha (27-acre) Selvitsky Island. Buses, taxis, and cars travel over the road. When the lake is frozen in winter, it is only a 3 km (1.9 mi) walk over the ice between Valday and the monastery.

== Putin's Dacha ==
Putin's Dacha is on the southern 100 ha (250 acres) of a peninsula between Lake Uzhin and Lake Valdai and is across Lake Valdai from Valday. Built in 1980, it is often called Valdai, Dolgie Borody (Russian: Долгие Бороды), Uzhin (Russian: «Ужин») or Stalin's Dacha, though Stalin was long dead when it was built. (Note: As of 2021 in addition to Valdai or Dolgie Borody, other residences and offices for the President of Russia include the Kremlin, Novo-Ogaryovo (Russian: Ново-Огарёво) in Moscow Oblast at Rublyovka west of Moscow, Gorky-9 (Russian: Горки-9) in Moscow Oblast at Rublyovka 15 km (9.3 mi) west of Moscow, Bocharov Ruchey, Bocharov Stream, or Riviera (Russian: Бочаров ручей) at Sochi, Rus lodge at the Zavidovo (Russian: Русь «Завидово») hunting grounds near Kozlovo in the Tver Oblast, Barvikha (Russian: Барвиха) or Meyendorff Castle in the Moscow Oblast, Sosny (Russian: Сосны) along the Yenisei near Krasnoyarsk, Shuskaya Chupa (Russian: Шуйская Чупа) along Lake Kochozero (Russian: Кончозеро) 20 km (12 mi) from Petrozavodsk in Karelia which is owned by Alexei Mordashov of the Severstal group since 15 April 2011, Volzhsky Otyos or Volzhsky Cliffs (Russian: Волжский Утёс) along the Kuybyshev Reservoir or Samara Reservoir in the Samara Oblast, Angarsky Kutora or Angarsky Farm (Russian: Ангарские хутора) along the Angara 47 km (29 mi) from Irkutsk, Tantalus (Russian: Тантал) along the Volga near Chardym 40 km (25 mi) from Saratov, Putin's Palace along the Black Sea at Cape Idokopas (Russian: Мыс Идокопас) near Gelendzhik, Maly-Istok (Russian: Малый исток) which is a suburb of Yekaterinburg in Sverdlovskaya Oblast, Sevastyanov's House (Russian: Дом Севастьянова) at Yekaterinburg, several dachas in Crimea, and a presidential office in the Constantine Palace or Konstantinovsky Dvorets (Russian: Константиновский дворец в Стрельне) at Strelna in Petrodvortsovy District of Saint Petersburg. During their presidencies, Vladimir Putin primarily resides at Novo-Ogaryovo and Dmitry Medvedev primarily resided at Gorky-9.) Abutting north of this location are 150 ha (370 acres) owned by the Russian Federation and frequented by the Federal Security Service. According to Alexei Navalny, Yuri Kovalchuk is the owner of Putin's Dacha.

The property, also known as Valdai Palace, has been outfitted with several air defence systems amidst the rising threat of Ukrainian missile and drone strikes as part of the Russian invasion of Ukraine. These systems include Pantsir S-1 self-propelled anti-aircraft weapons and at least one S-400 surface-to-air missile system
