= Valdai Hills =

Upland region in Russia

Coordinates: 57°00′N 33°30′E

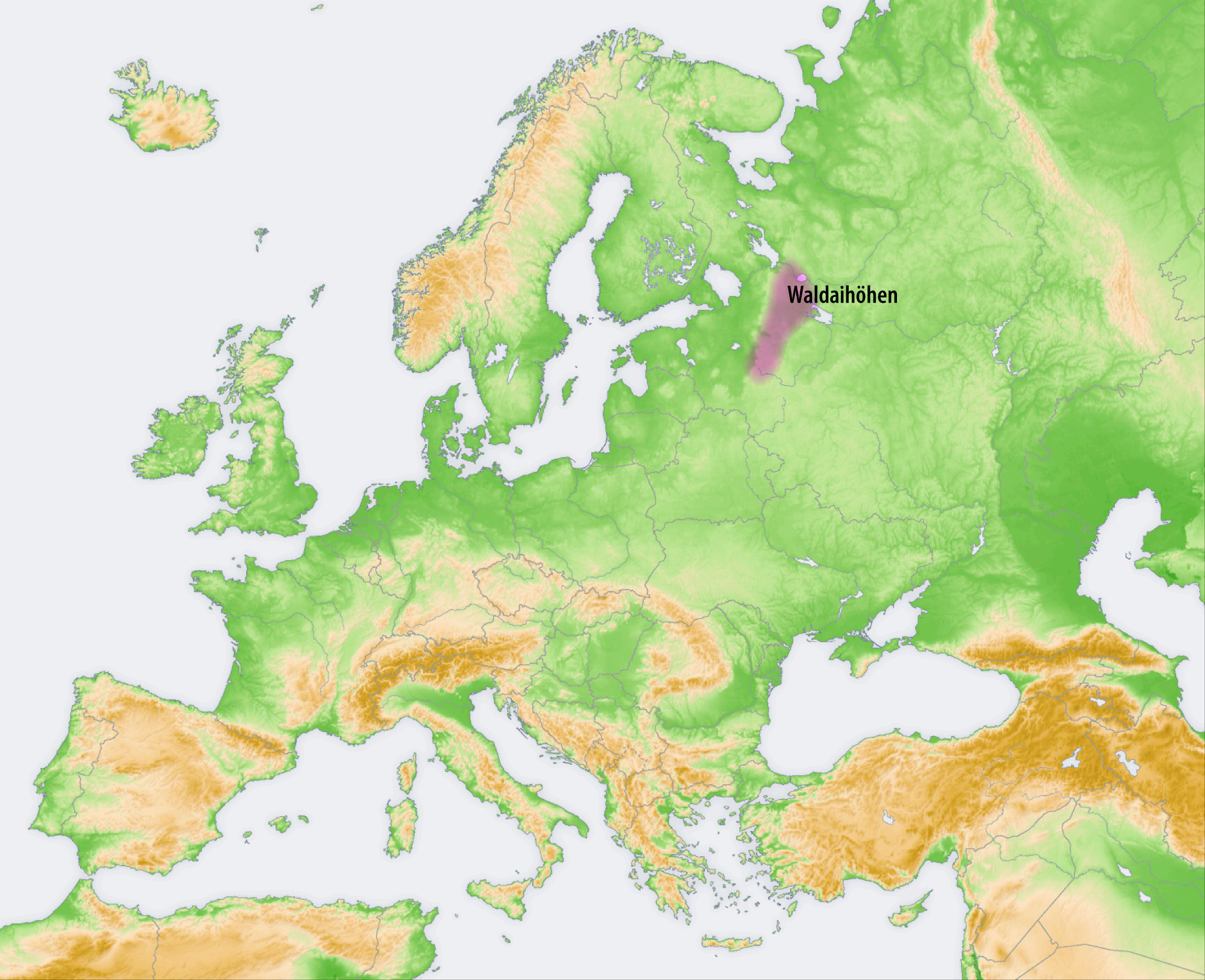
Valdai Hills located in the north-west of central European Russia

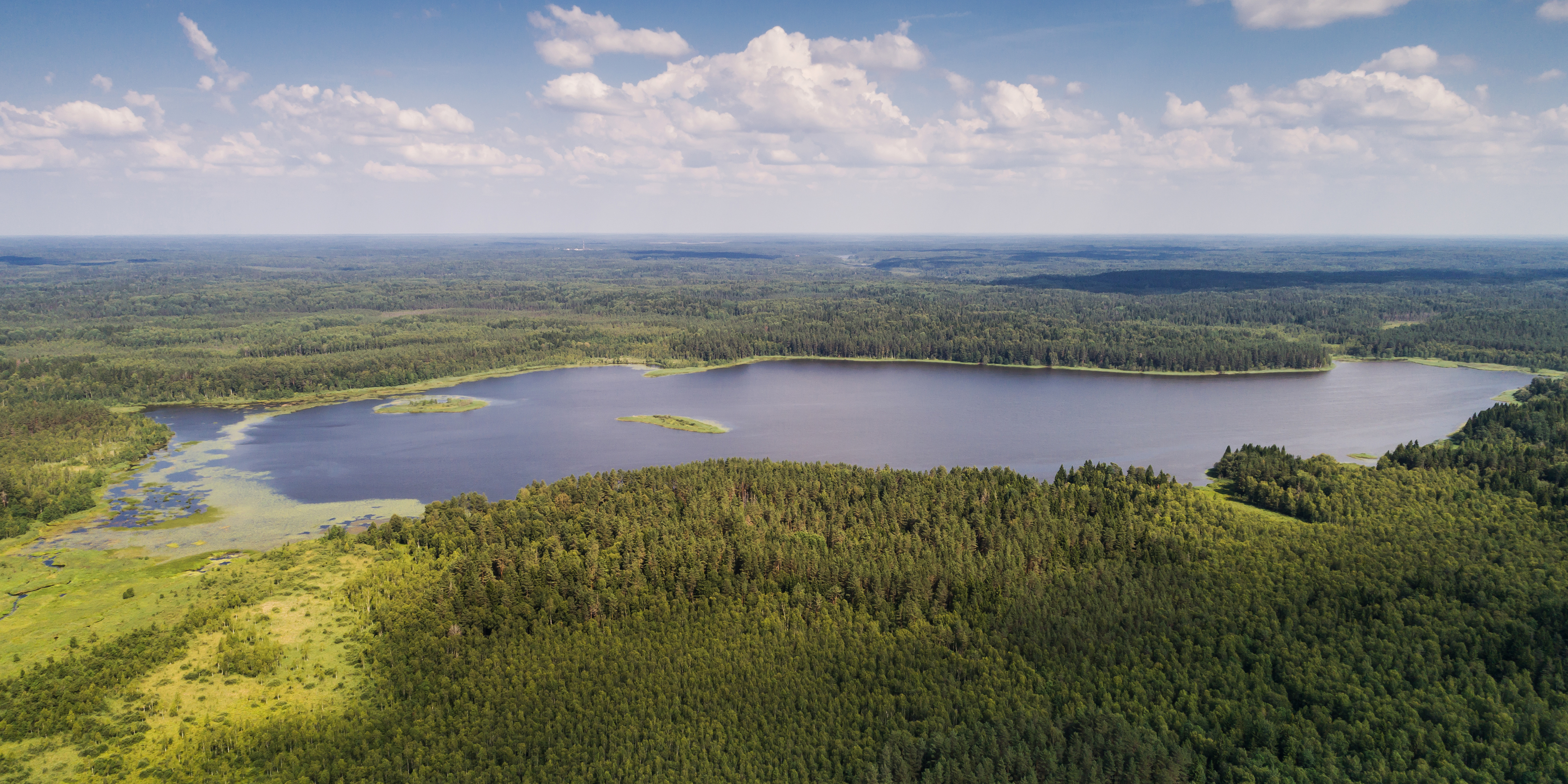
Valdai Hills at Lake Sitno

The Valdai Hills, (Note: Russian: Валдайская возвышенность, romanized: Valdáyskaya vozvýshennost) sometimes shortened to Valdai, (Note: /vælˈdaɪ/; Russian: Валдай, romanized: Valdáy, IPA: [vɐɫˈdaj]) are an upland region in the north-west of central European Russia running north–south, about midway between Saint Petersburg and Moscow, spanning Leningrad, Novgorod, Tver, Pskov, and Smolensk Oblasts.

The Valdai Hills are a popular tourist destination, particularly for fishing. The towns of Ostashkov and Valday are also known for their historical associations.

Valdaysky National Park was established in 1990 in the southern part of Novgorod Oblast to protect the landscapes of the highest part of the hills. The park includes Lake Valdayskoye and the northern section of Lake Seliger, as well as the town of Valday. Since 2004, the National Park has the status of a UNESCO Biosphere Reserve.

== Geography and geology ==
The hills are a northward extension of the Central Russian Upland. To the northwest stretches the Vepsian Upland. The ridge is overlain by deposited glacial materials in the form of terminal moraines and other detritus. The Valdai Hills reach their maximum height of 346.9 m (1,138 ft) near Vyshny Volochyok.

The Volga, the Daugava (the Western Dvina), the Lovat, the Msta, the Dnieper, the Syas, and other rivers originate in the Valdai Hills. The region thus is divided among the drainage basins of the Caspian Sea (the Volga), the Black Sea (the Dnieper), and the Baltic Sea (the Msta and the Lovat via the Volkhov, the Syas via Lake Ladoga and the Neva, and the Daugava).

It is a place of many lakes, among them Lake Volgo, Lake Peno, Lake Seliger, Lake Brosno, and Lake Valdayskoye.

During the last glacial period, the Valdai Hills with its hard rocks posed an obstacle to the glacier ice that advances from northwest, diverting the ice into the lowlands.
