= Dmitriyevo =

Dmitriyevo (Russian: Дмитриево) is the name of several rural localities in Russia:

- Dmitriyevo, Kotlassky District, Arkhangelsk Oblast, a village in Udimsky Selsoviet of Kotlassky District of Arkhangelsk Oblast
- Dmitriyevo, Velsky District, Arkhangelsk Oblast, a village in Puysky Selsoviet of Velsky District of Arkhangelsk Oblast
- Dmitriyevo, Buysky District, Kostroma Oblast, a village in Tsentralnoye Settlement of Buysky District of Kostroma Oblast
- Dmitriyevo, Manturovsky District, Kostroma Oblast, a village in Ugorskoye Settlement of Manturovsky District of Kostroma Oblast
- Dmitriyevo, Sivinsky District, Perm Krai, a village in Sivinsky District, Perm Krai
- Dmitriyevo, Yusvinsky District, Perm Krai, a village in Yusvinsky District, Perm Krai
- Dmitriyevo, Kasimovsky District, Ryazan Oblast, a selo in Dmitriyevsky Rural Okrug of Kasimovsky District of Ryazan Oblast
- Dmitriyevo, Klepikovsky District, Ryazan Oblast, a village in Kolesnikovsky Rural Okrug of Klepikovsky District of Ryazan Oblast
- Dmitriyevo, Gorlovsky Rural Okrug, Skopinsky District, Ryazan Oblast, a selo in Gorlovsky Rural Okrug of Skopinsky District of Ryazan Oblast
- Dmitriyevo, Yermolovsky Rural Okrug, Skopinsky District, Ryazan Oblast, a selo in Yermolovsky Rural Okrug of Skopinsky District of Ryazan Oblast
- Dmitriyevo, Gus-Khrustalny District, Vladimir Oblast, a village in Gus-Khrustalny District, Vladimir Oblast
- Dmitriyevo, Kovrovsky District, Vladimir Oblast, a village in Kovrovsky District, Vladimir Oblast
- Dmitriyevo, Melenkovsky District, Vladimir Oblast, a village in Melenkovsky District, Vladimir Oblast
- Dmitriyevo, Babushkinsky District, Vologda Oblast, a village in Bereznikovsky Selsoviet of Babushkinsky District of Vologda Oblast
- Dmitriyevo, Cherepovetsky District, Vologda Oblast, a village in Nikolo-Ramensky Selsoviet of Cherepovetsky District of Vologda Oblast
- Dmitriyevo, Lezhsky Selsoviet, Gryazovetsky District, Vologda Oblast, a village in Lezhsky Selsoviet of Gryazovetsky District of Vologda Oblast
- Dmitriyevo, Rostilovsky Selsoviet, Gryazovetsky District, Vologda Oblast, a village in Rostilovsky Selsoviet of Gryazovetsky District of Vologda Oblast
- Dmitriyevo, Kharovsky District, Vologda Oblast, a village in Kharovsky Selsoviet of Kharovsky District of Vologda Oblast
- Dmitriyevo, Kirillovsky District, Vologda Oblast, a village in Kolkachsky Selsoviet of Kirillovsky District of Vologda Oblast
- Dmitriyevo, Nyuksensky District, Vologda Oblast, a village in Dmitriyevsky Selsoviet of Nyuksensky District of Vologda Oblast
- Dmitriyevo, Ust-Kubinsky District, Vologda Oblast, a village in Filisovsky Selsoviet of Ust-Kubinsky District of Vologda Oblast
- Dmitriyevo, Vologodsky District, Vologda Oblast, a village in Raboche-Krestyansky Selsoviet of Vologodsky District of Vologda Oblast
- Dmitriyevo, Poshekhonsky District, Yaroslavl Oblast, a village in Vasilyevsky Rural Okrug of Poshekhonsky District of Yaroslavl Oblast
- Dmitriyevo, Yaroslavsky District, Yaroslavl Oblast, a village in Tunoshensky Rural Okrug of Yaroslavsky District of Yaroslavl Oblast
