= Andoga =

Andoga Russian: Андога
- Map of the Rybinsk Reservoir basin. The Andoga is shown on the map.

Location
- Country: Russia

Physical characteristics
- Source: Lake Andozero
  - elevation: 140 m (460 ft)
- Mouth: Suda
  - coordinates: 59°11′38″N 37°23′11″E
- Length: 142 km (88 mi)
- Basin size: 3,760 km^{2} (1,450 sq mi)

Basin features
- Progression: Suda→ Volga→ Caspian Sea

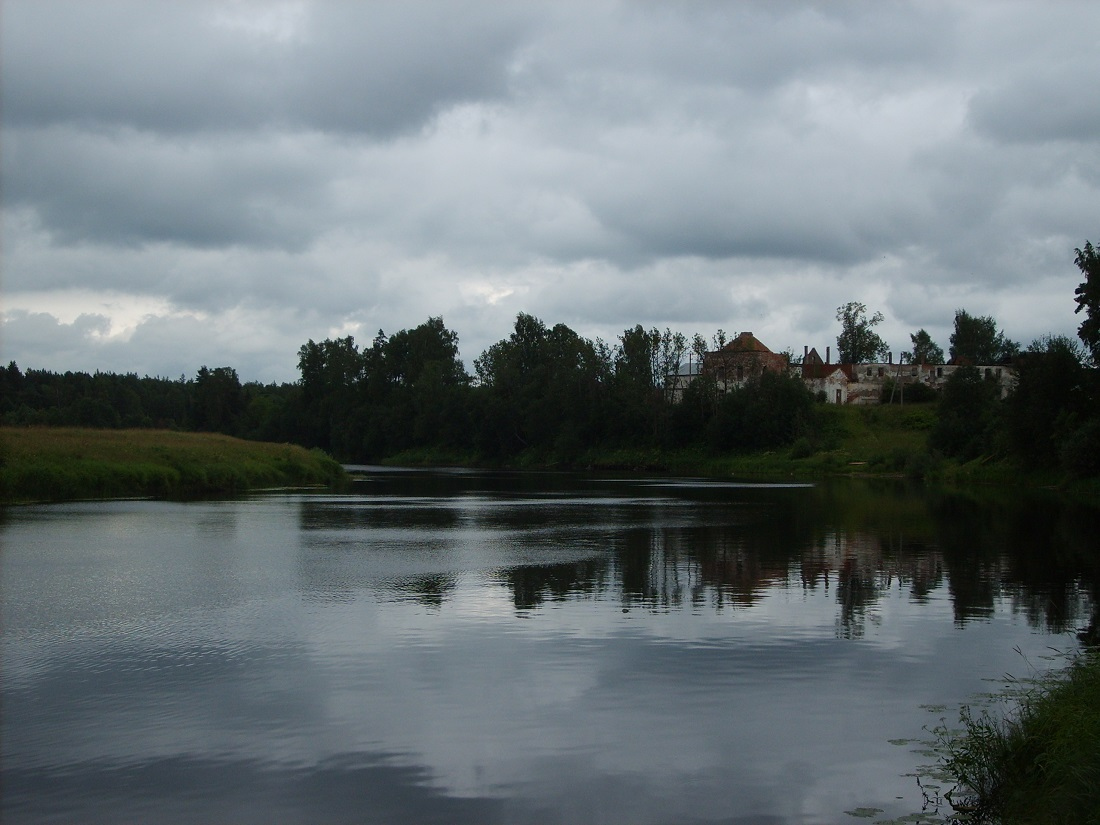
View of the Andoga, Kaduyusky District

The Andoga (Russian: Андога) is a river in Belozersky, Kaduyusky, and Cherepovetsky Districts of Vologda Oblast in Russia. It is a left tributary of the Suda. It is 142 kilometers (88 mi) long, and the area of its basin 3,760 square kilometers (1,450 sq mi). The principal tributaries of the Andoga are the Shulma (left), the Miga (right), and the Vizma (left).

The source of the Andoga is in the western part of Lake Andozero. The river flows in the southern direction through a flat, swampy area. Close to the mouth of the Shulma there are several villages at the banks of the Andoga, including Novoye and Nikolskoye. Downstream from these villages a road follows the left bank of the river, eventually deviating southwest to Kaduy. In the lowest course a short stretch of the Andoga enters Cherepovetsky District. The mouth of the Andoga is in the village of Andogsky, several kilometers north of the urban-type settlement of Khokhlovo.

In the 16th century the Andoga was notable for the fishery, and zander from the Andoga was sent to the Tsar. At the same time, first regular settlements appeared. The area which is now Kaduyusky District was referred to at the time as Andogsky Stan.
