= Fanerny Zavod =

Fanerny Zavod Фанерный Завод
- Settlement
- Location within Vologda Oblast Location within Russia
- Coordinates: 59°16′N 37°16′E
- Country: Russia
- Region: Vologda Oblast
- District: Kaduysky District
- Time zone: UTC+3:00

Fanerny Zavod (Russian: Фанерный Завод) is a rural locality (a settlement) in Nikolskoye Rural Settlement, Kaduysky District, Vologda Oblast, Russia. The population was one person as of 2002. There are 13 streets.

== Geography ==
Fanerny Zavod is located 13 km northeast of Kaduy (the district's administrative centre) by road. Zhornovets is the nearest rural locality.
