= Ishkoboy =

Ishkoboy Ишкобой
- Village
- Location within Vologda Oblast Location within Russia
- Coordinates: 59°26′N 37°08′E
- Country: Russia
- Region: Vologda Oblast
- District: Kaduysky District
- Time zone: UTC+3:00

Ishkoboy (Russian: Ишкобой) is a rural locality (a village) in Nikolskoye Rural Settlement, Kaduysky District, Vologda Oblast, Russia. The population was 14 as of 2002.

== Geography ==
Ishkoboy is located 38 km north of Kaduy (the district's administrative centre) by road. Bilkovo is the nearest rural locality.
