= Malafeyevo =

Malafeyevo Малафеево
- Village
- Location within Vologda Oblast Location within Russia
- Coordinates: 59°07′N 37°02′E
- Country: Russia
- Region: Vologda Oblast
- District: Kaduysky District
- Time zone: UTC+3:00

Malafeyevo (Russian: Малафеево) is a rural locality (a village) in Semizerye Rural Settlement, Kaduysky District, Vologda Oblast, Russia. The population was 5 as of 2002.

== Geography ==
Malafeyevo is located 20 km southwest of Kaduy (the district's administrative centre) by road. Vershina is the nearest rural locality.
