= Shiryevo =

Shiryevo Ширьево
- Passing loop
- Location within Vologda Oblast Location within Russia
- Coordinates: 59°15′N 36°34′E
- Country: Russia
- Region: Vologda Oblast
- District: Kaduysky District
- Time zone: UTC+3:00

Shiryevo (Russian: Ширьево) is a rural locality (a passing loop) in Nikolskoye Rural Settlement, Kaduysky District, Vologda Oblast, Russia. The population was 8 as of 2002.

== Geography ==
Shiryevo is located 43 km northwest of Kaduy (the district's administrative centre) by road. Verkhny Dvor is the nearest rural locality.
