= Seltso-Rodnoye =

Seltso-Rodnoye Сельцо-Родное
- Village
- Location within Vologda Oblast Location within Russia
- Coordinates: 59°30′N 36°36′E
- Country: Russia
- Region: Vologda Oblast
- District: Kaduysky District
- Time zone: UTC+3:00

Seltso-Rodnoye (Russian: Сельцо-Родное) is a rural locality (a village) in Nikolskoye Rural Settlement, Kaduysky District, Vologda Oblast, Russia. The population was 1 as of 2002.

== Geography ==
Seltso-Rodnoye is located 60 km (37 mi) northwest of Kaduy (the district's administrative centre) by road. Uspenskoye is the nearest rural locality.
