= Nizhny Pochinok =

Nizhny Pochinok Нижний Починок
- Village
- Location within Vologda Oblast Location within Russia
- Coordinates: 59°20′N 37°19′E
- Country: Russia
- Region: Vologda Oblast
- District: Kaduysky District
- Time zone: UTC+3:00

Nizhny Pochinok (Russian: Нижний Починок) is a rural locality (a village) in Nikolskoye Rural Settlement, Kaduysky District, Vologda Oblast, Russia. The population was 14 as of 2002.

== Geography ==
Nizhny Pochinok is located 22 km northeast of Kaduy (the district's administrative centre) by road. Myza is the nearest rural locality.
