= Ivachevo, Vologda Oblast =

Ivachevo Ивачево
- Village
- Location within Vologda Oblast Location within Russia
- Coordinates: 59°21′N 37°19′E
- Country: Russia
- Region: Vologda Oblast
- District: Kaduysky District
- Time zone: UTC+3:00

Ivachevo (Russian: Ивачево) is a rural locality (a village) in Nikolskoye Rural Settlement, Kaduysky District, Vologda Oblast, Russia. The population was 31 in 2002.

== Geography ==
Ivachevo is located 24 km northeast of Kaduy (the district's administrative centre) by road. Nizhny Pochinok is the nearest rural locality.
