= Veliky Dvor, Kaduysky District, Vologda Oblast =

Veliky Dvor Великий Двор
- Village
- Location within Vologda Oblast Location within Russia
- Coordinates: 59°28′N 36°38′E
- Country: Russia
- Region: Vologda Oblast
- District: Kaduysky District
- Time zone: UTC+3:00

Veliky Dvor (Russian: Великий Двор) is a rural locality (a village) in Semizerye Rural Settlement, Kaduysky District, Vologda Oblast, Russia. The population was 5 as of 2002.

== Geography ==
Veliky Dvor is located 61 km northwest of Kaduy (the district's administrative centre) by road. Gorka is the nearest rural locality.
