= Turpal =

Village in Russia

Turpal Турпал
- Village
- Location within Vologda Oblast Location within Russia
- Coordinates: 59°33′N 36°28′E
- Country: Russia
- Region: Vologda Oblast
- District: Kaduysky District
- Time zone: UTC+3:00

Turpal (Russian: Турпал) is a rural locality (a village) in Semizerye Rural Settlement, Kaduysky District, Vologda Oblast, Russia. The population was 5 as of 2002.

== Geography ==
Turpal is located 65 km northwest of Kaduy (the district's administrative centre) by road. Timokhino is the nearest rural locality.
