= Dedovets, Kaduysky District, Vologda Oblast =

Dedovets Дедовец
- Village
- Location within Vologda Oblast Location within Russia
- Coordinates: 59°13′N 37°12′E
- Country: Russia
- Region: Vologda Oblast
- District: Kaduysky District
- Time zone: UTC+3:00

Dedovets (Russian: Дедовец) is a rural locality (a village) in Semizerye Rural Settlement, Kaduysky District, Vologda Oblast, Russia. The population was 19 as of 2002.

== Geography ==
Dedovets is located 7 km northeast of Kaduy (the district's administrative centre) by road. Kholmanitsa is the nearest rural locality.
