= Churovo =

Churovo Чурово
- Village
- Location within Vologda Oblast Location within Russia
- Coordinates: 59°21′N 37°12′E
- Country: Russia
- Region: Vologda Oblast
- District: Kaduysky District
- Time zone: UTC+3:00

Churovo (Russian: Чурово) is a rural locality (a village) in Nikolskoye Rural Settlement, Kaduysky District, Vologda Oblast, Russia. The population was 5 as of 2002.

== Geography ==
Churovo is located 28 km northeast of Kaduy (the district's administrative centre) by road. Prechistoye is the nearest rural locality.
