= Kaduy (village), Kaduysky District, Vologda Oblast =

Kaduy Кадуй
- Village
- Nickname
- Location within Vologda Oblast Location within Russia
- Coordinates: 59°14′N 37°15′E
- Country: Russia
- Region: Vologda Oblast
- District: Kaduysky District
- Time zone: UTC+3:00

Kaduy (Russian: Кадуй) is a rural locality (a village) in Semizerye Rural Settlement, Kaduysky District, Vologda Oblast, Russia. The population was 19 as of 2002.

== Geography ==
It is located 10 km northeast of Kaduy (a work settlement and the district's administrative centre) by road. Zhornovets is the nearest locality.

== Etymology ==
According to Nasom.ru, the name originates from a truncation of "kadag", which means "juniper".
