= Sredny Dvor =

Sredny Dvor Средний Двор
- Village
- Location within Vologda Oblast Location within Russia
- Coordinates: 59°27′N 37°14′E
- Country: Russia
- Region: Vologda Oblast
- District: Kaduysky District
- Time zone: UTC+3:00

Sredny Dvor (Russian: Средний Двор) is a rural locality (a village) in Nikolskoye Rural Settlement, Kaduysky District, Vologda Oblast, Russia. The population was 6 as of 2002.

== Geography ==
Sredny Dvor is located 42 km northeast of Kaduy (the district's administrative centre) by road. Koposovo is the nearest rural locality.
