= Yaryshevo =

Yaryshevo Ярышево
- Village
- Location within Vologda Oblast Location within Russia
- Coordinates: 59°16′N 37°22′E
- Country: Russia
- Region: Vologda Oblast
- District: Kaduysky District
- Time zone: UTC+3:00

Yaryshevo (Russian: Ярышево) is a rural locality (a village) in Nikolskoye Rural Settlement, Kaduysky District, Vologda Oblast, Russia. The population was 10 as of 2002.

== Geography ==
Yaryshevo is located 21 km northeast of Kaduy (the district's administrative centre) by road. Zykovo is the nearest rural locality.
