= Spiryutino =

Spiryutino Спирютино
- Village
- Location within Vologda Oblast Location within Russia
- Coordinates: 59°17′N 37°20′E
- Country: Russia
- Region: Vologda Oblast
- District: Kaduysky District
- Time zone: UTC+3:00

Spiryutino (Russian: Спирютино) is a rural locality (a village) in Nikolskoye Rural Settlement, Kaduysky District, Vologda Oblast, Russia. The population was 26 as of 2002.

== Geography ==
Spiryutino is located 18 km northeast of Kaduy (the district's administrative centre) by road. Boylovo is the nearest rural locality.
