= Oseka, Vologda Oblast =

Oseka Осека
- Village
- Location within Vologda Oblast Location within Russia
- Coordinates: 59°31′N 36°35′E
- Country: Russia
- Region: Vologda Oblast
- District: Kaduysky District
- Time zone: UTC+3:00

Oseka (Russian: Осека) is a rural locality (a village) in Nikolskoye Rural Settlement, Kaduysky District, Vologda Oblast, Russia. The population was 3 as of 2002.

== Geography ==
Oseka is located 63 km northwest of Kaduy (the district's administrative centre) by road. Tarasovskaya is the nearest rural locality.
