= Budimorovo =

Budimorovo Будиморово
- Village
- Location within Vologda Oblast Location within Russia
- Coordinates: 59°22′N 37°11′E
- Country: Russia
- Region: Vologda Oblast
- District: Kaduysky District
- Time zone: UTC+3:00

Budimorovo (Russian: Будиморово) is a rural locality (a village) in Nikolskoye Rural Settlement, Kaduysky District, Vologda Oblast, Russia. The population was 10 as of 2002.

== Geography ==
Budimorovo is located 28 km north of Kaduy (the district's administrative centre) by road. Nikonovskaya is the nearest rural locality.
