= Selishche, Kaduysky District, Vologda Oblast =

Selishche Селище
- Village
- Location within Vologda Oblast Location within Russia
- Coordinates: 59°13′N 37°14′E
- Country: Russia
- Region: Vologda Oblast
- District: Kaduysky District
- Time zone: UTC+3:00

Selishche (Russian: Селище) is a rural locality (a village) in Semizerye Rural Settlement, Kaduysky District, Vologda Oblast, Russia. The population was 22 as of 2002.

== Geography ==
Selishche is located 8 km northeast of Kaduy (the district's administrative centre) by road. Filino is the nearest rural locality.
