= Andronovo, Kaduysky District, Vologda Oblast =

Andronovo Андроново
- Village
- Location within Vologda Oblast Location within Russia
- Coordinates: 59°24′N 37°15′E
- Country: Russia
- Region: Vologda Oblast
- District: Kaduysky District
- Time zone: UTC+3:00

Andronovo (Russian: Андроново) is a rural locality (a village) in Nikolskoye Rural Settlement, Kaduysky District, Vologda Oblast, Russia. The population was 192 as of 2002. There are 5 streets.

== Geography ==
Andronovo is located 39 km north of Kaduy (the district's administrative centre) by road. Martyukhino is the nearest rural locality.
