= Dubrovnoye =

Dubrovnoye Дубровное
- Village
- Location within Vologda Oblast Location within Russia
- Coordinates: 59°10′N 37°14′E
- Country: Russia
- Region: Vologda Oblast
- District: Kaduysky District
- Time zone: UTC+3:00

Dubrovnoye (Russian: Дубровное) is a rural locality (a village) in Semizerye Rural Settlement, Kaduysky District, Vologda Oblast, Russia. The population was 10 as of 2002.

== Geography ==
Dubrovnoye is located 8 km southeast of Kaduy (the district's administrative centre) by road. Yakimovo is the nearest rural locality.
