= Preobrazhenskaya, Vologda Oblast =

Preobrazhenskaya Преображенская
- Village
- Location within Vologda Oblast Location within Russia
- Coordinates: 59°32′N 36°32′E
- Country: Russia
- Region: Vologda Oblast
- District: Kaduysky District
- Time zone: UTC+3:00

Preobrazhenskaya (Russian: Преображенская) is a rural locality (a village) in Nikolskoye Rural Settlement, Kaduysky District, Vologda Oblast, Russia. The population was 9 as of 2002.

== Geography ==
Preobrazhenskaya is located 64 km northwest of Kaduy (the district's administrative centre) by road. Aksentyevskaya is the nearest rural locality.
