= Kananyevskaya =

Kananyevskaya Кананьевская
- Village
- Location within Vologda Oblast Location within Russia
- Coordinates: 59°30′N 36°30′E
- Country: Russia
- Region: Vologda Oblast
- District: Kaduysky District
- Time zone: UTC+3:00

Kananyevskaya (Russian: Кананьевская) is a rural locality (a village) in Nikolskoye Rural Settlement, Kaduysky District, Vologda Oblast, Russia. The population was 11 as of 2002.

== Geography ==
Kananyevskaya is located 62 km northwest of Kaduy (the district's administrative centre) by road. Krestovaya is the nearest rural locality.
