= Zadnyaya Stupolokhta =

Zadnyaya Stupolokhta Задняя Ступолохта
- Village
- Location within Vologda Oblast Location within Russia
- Coordinates: 59°30′N 36°59′E
- Country: Russia
- Region: Vologda Oblast
- District: Kaduysky District
- Time zone: UTC+3:00

Zadnyaya Stupolokhta (Russian: Задняя Ступолохта) is a rural locality (a village) in Nikolskoye Rural Settlement, Kaduysky District, Vologda Oblast, Russia. The population was 3 as of 2002.

== Geography ==
Zadnyaya Stupolokhta is located 45 km north of Kaduy (the district's administrative centre) by road. Srednyaya Stupolokhta is the nearest rural locality.
