= Alenkino =

Alenkino Аленкино
- Village
- Location within Vologda Oblast Location within Russia
- Coordinates: 59°32′N 36°59′E
- Country: Russia
- Region: Vologda Oblast
- District: Kaduysky District
- Time zone: UTC+3:00

Alenkino (Russian: Аленкино) is a rural locality (a village) in Nikolskoye Rural Settlement, Kaduysky District, Vologda Oblast, Russia. The population was 11 as of 2002.

== Geography ==
Alenkino is located 49 km north of Kaduy (the district's administrative centre) by road. Krasnoye is the nearest rural locality.
