= Ilemnoye =

Ilemnoye Илемное
- Village
- Location within Vologda Oblast Location within Russia
- Coordinates: 59°28′N 37°14′E
- Country: Russia
- Region: Vologda Oblast
- District: Kaduysky District
- Time zone: UTC+3:00

Ilemnoye (Russian: Илемное) is a rural locality (a village) in Nikolskoye Rural Settlement, Kaduysky District, Vologda Oblast, Russia. The population was 5 as of 2002.

== Geography ==
Ilemnoye is located 45 km north of Kaduy (the district's administrative centre) by road. Koposovo is the nearest rural locality.
