= Nikonovskaya =

Nikonovskaya Никоновская
- Village
- Location within Vologda Oblast Location within Russia
- Coordinates: 59°22′N 37°11′E
- Country: Russia
- Region: Vologda Oblast
- District: Kaduysky District
- Time zone: UTC+3:00

Nikonovskaya (Russian: Никоновская) is a rural locality (a village) in Nikolskoye Rural Settlement, Kaduysky District, Vologda Oblast, Russia. The population was 7 as of 2002.

== Geography ==
Nikonovskaya is located 33 km north of Kaduy (the district's administrative centre) by road. Ivanovo is the nearest rural locality.
