= Savelyevskaya =

Savelyevskaya Савельевская
- Village
- Location within Vologda Oblast Location within Russia
- Coordinates: 59°30′N 36°32′E
- Country: Russia
- Region: Vologda Oblast
- District: Kaduysky District
- Time zone: UTC+3:00

Savelyevskaya (Russian: Савельевская) is a rural locality (a village) in Semizerye Rural Settlement, Kaduysky District, Vologda Oblast, Russia. The population was 6 as of 2002.

== Geography ==
Savelyevskaya is located 58 km northwest of Kaduy (the district's administrative centre) by road. Yakshinskaya is the nearest rural locality.
