= Ust-Kolp =

Ust-Kolp Усть-Колпь
- Village
- Location within Vologda Oblast Location within Russia
- Coordinates: 59°20′N 36°49′E
- Country: Russia
- Region: Vologda Oblast
- District: Kaduysky District
- Time zone: UTC+3:00

Ust-Kolp (Russian: Усть-Колпь) is a rural locality (a village) in Semizerye Rural Settlement, Kaduysky District, Vologda Oblast, Russia. The population was 8 as of 2002.

== Geography ==
Ust-Kolp is located 42 km northwest of Kaduy (the district's administrative centre) by road. Kurakino is the nearest rural locality.
