= Shoborovo =

Shoborovo Шоборово
- Village
- Location within Vologda Oblast Location within Russia
- Coordinates: 59°16′N 36°35′E
- Country: Russia
- Region: Vologda Oblast
- District: Kaduysky District
- Time zone: UTC+3:00

Shoborovo (Russian: Шоборово) is a rural locality (a village) in Nikolskoye Rural Settlement, Kaduysky District, Vologda Oblast, Russia. The population was 19 as of 2002.

== Geography ==
Shoborovo is located 44 km northwest of Kaduy (the district's administrative centre) by road. Verkhny Dvor is the nearest rural locality.
