= Aksentyevskaya, Kaduysky District, Vologda Oblast =

Aksentyevskaya Аксентьевская
- Village
- Location within Vologda Oblast Location within Russia
- Coordinates: 59°31′N 36°32′E
- Country: Russia
- Region: Vologda Oblast
- District: Kaduysky District
- Time zone: UTC+3:00

Aksentyevskaya (Russian: Аксентьевская) is a rural locality (a village) in Semizerye Rural Settlement, Kaduysky District, Vologda Oblast, Russia. The population was 16 as of 2002.

== Geography ==
Aksentyevskaya is located 63 km northwest of Kaduy (the district's administrative centre) by road. Preobrazhenskaya is the nearest rural locality.
