= Krugloye, Vologda Oblast =

Krugloye Круглое
- Village
- Location within Vologda Oblast Location within Russia
- Coordinates: 59°11′N 37°22′E
- Country: Russia
- Region: Vologda Oblast
- District: Kaduysky District
- Time zone: UTC+3:00

Krugloye (Russian: Круглое) is a rural locality (a village) in Semizerye Rural Settlement, Kaduysky District, Vologda Oblast, Russia. The population was 3 as of 2002. There are 2 streets.

== Geography ==
Krugloye is located 15 km east of Kaduy (the district's administrative centre) by road. Zaozerye is the nearest rural locality.
