= Zhukov Pochinok =

Zhukov Pochinok Жуков Починок
- Village
- Location within Vologda Oblast Location within Russia
- Coordinates: 59°19′N 37°19′E
- Country: Russia
- Region: Vologda Oblast
- District: Kaduysky District
- Time zone: UTC+3:00

Zhukov Pochinok (Russian: Жуков Починок) is a rural locality (a village) in Nikolskoye Rural Settlement, Kaduysky District, Vologda Oblast, Russia. The population was 5 as of 2002.

== Geography ==
Zhukov Pochinok is located 20 km northeast of Kaduy (the district's administrative centre) by road. Myza is the nearest rural locality.
