= Tomasha =

Tomasha Томаша
- Village
- Location within Vologda Oblast Location within Russia
- Coordinates: 59°22′N 37°14′E
- Country: Russia
- Region: Vologda Oblast
- District: Kaduysky District
- Time zone: UTC+3:00

Tomasha (Russian: Томаша) is a rural locality (a village) in Nikolskoye Rural Settlement, Kaduysky District, Vologda Oblast, Russia. The population was 1 as of 2002.

== Geography ==
Tomasha is located 32 km northeast of Kaduy (the district's administrative centre) by road. Pelemen is the nearest rural locality.
