= Bolshaya Gorka =

Bolshaya Gorka Большая Горка
- Village
- Location within Vologda Oblast Location within Russia
- Coordinates: 59°18′N 37°17′E
- Country: Russia
- Region: Vologda Oblast
- District: Kaduysky District
- Time zone: UTC+3:00

Bolshaya Gorka (Russian: Большая Горка) is a rural locality (a village) in Nikolskoye Rural Settlement, Kaduysky District, Vologda Oblast, Russia. The population was 3 as of 2002.

== Geography ==
Bolshaya Gorka is located 15 km northeast of Kaduy (the district's administrative centre) by road. Malaya Gorka is the nearest rural locality.
