= Solokhta =

Solokhta Солохта
- Village
- Location within Vologda Oblast Location within Russia
- Coordinates: 59°21′41″N 37°08′12″E
- Country: Russia
- Region: Vologda Oblast
- District: Kaduysky District
- Time zone: UTC+3:00

Solokhta (Russian: Солохта) is a rural locality (a village) in Nikolskoye Rural Settlement, Kaduysky District, Vologda Oblast, Russia. The population was 10 as of 2002.

== Geography ==
Solokhta is located 27 km north of Kaduy (the district's administrative centre) by road. Kovalyovo is the nearest rural locality.
