= Malaya Stupolokhta =

Malaya Stupolokhta Малая Ступолохта
- Village
- Location within Vologda Oblast Location within Russia
- Coordinates: 59°31′N 36°59′E
- Country: Russia
- Region: Vologda Oblast
- District: Kaduysky District
- Time zone: UTC+3:00

Malaya Stupolokhta (Russian: Малая Ступолохта) is a rural locality (a village) in Nikolskoye Rural Settlement, Kaduysky District, Vologda Oblast, Russia. The population was 2 as of 2002.

== Geography ==
Malaya Stupolokhta is located 47 km north of Kaduy (the district's administrative centre) by road. Srednyaya Stupolokhta is the nearest rural locality.
