= Dilskiye =

Dilskiye Дильские
- Village
- Location within Vologda Oblast Location within Russia
- Coordinates: 59°26′N 36°37′E
- Country: Russia
- Region: Vologda Oblast
- District: Kaduysky District
- Time zone: UTC+3:00

Dilskiye (Russian: Дильские) is a rural locality (a village) in Semizerye Rural Settlement, Kaduysky District, Vologda Oblast, Russia. The population was 10 as of 2002.

== Geography ==
Dilskiye is located 49 km northwest of Kaduy (the district's administrative centre) by road. Kuzminka is the nearest rural locality.
