= Shigodskiye =

Shigodskiye Шигодские
- Village
- Location within Vologda Oblast Location within Russia
- Coordinates: 59°35′N 36°28′E
- Country: Russia
- Region: Vologda Oblast
- District: Kaduysky District
- Time zone: UTC+3:00

Shigodskiye (Russian: Шигодские) is a rural locality (a village) in Semizerye Rural Settlement, Kaduysky District, Vologda Oblast, Russia. The population was 18 as of 2002.

== Geography ==
Shigodskiye is located 71 km northwest of Kaduy (the district's administrative centre) by road. Sosnovka is the nearest rural locality.
