= Zykovo, Kaduysky District, Vologda Oblast =

Zykovo Зыково
- Village
- Location within Vologda Oblast Location within Russia
- Coordinates: 59°16′N 37°21′E
- Country: Russia
- Region: Vologda Oblast
- District: Kaduysky District
- Time zone: UTC+3:00

Zykovo (Russian: Зыково) is a rural locality (a village) in Nikolskoye Rural Settlement, Kaduysky District, Vologda Oblast, Russia. The population was 12 as of 2002.

== Geography ==
Zykovo is located 20 km northeast of Kaduy (the district's administrative centre) by road. Yaryshevo is the nearest rural locality.
