= Kurakino, Kaduysky District, Vologda Oblast =

Kurakino Куракино
- Village
- Location within Vologda Oblast Location within Russia
- Coordinates: 59°21′N 36°47′E
- Country: Russia
- Region: Vologda Oblast
- District: Kaduysky District
- Time zone: UTC+3:00

Kurakino (Russian: Куракино) is a rural locality (a village) in Nikolskoye Rural Settlement, Kaduysky District, Vologda Oblast, Russia. The population was 31 as of 2002.

== Geography ==
Kurakino is located 39 km northwest of Kaduy (the district's administrative centre) by road. Pimenovo is the nearest rural locality.
