= Zakazarye =

Zakazarye Заказарье
- Village
- Location within Vologda Oblast Location within Russia
- Coordinates: 59°31′N 37°02′E
- Country: Russia
- Region: Vologda Oblast
- District: Kaduysky District
- Time zone: UTC+3:00

Zakazarye (Russian: Заказарье) is a rural locality (a village) in Nikolskoye Rural Settlement, Kaduysky District, Vologda Oblast, Russia. The population was 3 as of 2002.

== Geography ==
Zakazarye is located 48 km north of Kaduy (the district's administrative centre) by road. Velikoye is the nearest rural locality.
