= Yamyshevo =

Yamyshevo Ямышево
- Village
- Location within Vologda Oblast Location within Russia
- Coordinates: 59°12′N 37°05′E
- Country: Russia
- Region: Vologda Oblast
- District: Kaduysky District
- Time zone: UTC+3:00

Yamyshevo (Russian: Ямышево) is a rural locality (a village) in Nikolskoye Rural Settlement, Kaduysky District, Vologda Oblast, Russia. The population was 6 as of 2002.

== Geography ==
Yamyshevo is located 7 km west of Kaduy (the district's administrative centre) by road. Koptelovo is the nearest rural locality.
