= Lebenets =

Lebenets Лебенец
- Village
- Location within Vologda Oblast Location within Russia
- Coordinates: 59°28′N 37°02′E
- Country: Russia
- Region: Vologda Oblast
- District: Kaduysky District
- Time zone: UTC+3:00

Lebenets (Russian: Лебенец) is a rural locality (a village) in Nikolskoye Rural Settlement, Kaduysky District, Vologda Oblast, Russia. The population was 3 as of 2002.

== Geography ==
Lebenets is located 41 km north of Kaduy (the district's administrative centre) by road. Maksinskaya is the nearest rural locality.
