= Marygino =

Marygino Марыгино
- Village
- Location within Vologda Oblast Location within Russia
- Coordinates: 59°35′N 36°57′E
- Country: Russia
- Region: Vologda Oblast
- District: Kaduysky District
- Time zone: UTC+3:00

Marygino (Russian: Марыгино) is a rural locality (a village) in Nikolskoye Rural Settlement, Kaduysky District, Vologda Oblast, Russia. The population was 69 as of 2002. There are three streets.

== Geography ==
Marygino is located 54 km north of Kaduy (the district's administrative centre) by road. Velikoye is the nearest rural locality.
