= Chuprino =

Chuprino Чуприно
- Village
- Location within Vologda Oblast Location within Russia
- Coordinates: 59°11′N 37°08′E
- Country: Russia
- Region: Vologda Oblast
- District: Kaduysky District
- Time zone: UTC+3:00

Chuprino (Russian: Чуприно) is a rural locality (a village) in Kaduy Urban Settlement, Kaduysky District, Vologda Oblast, Russia. The population was 75 as of 2002.

== Geography ==
Chuprino is located 3 km southwest of Kaduy (the district's administrative centre) by road. Kaduy is the nearest rural locality.
