= Khlamovo =

Khlamovo Хламово
- Village
- Location within Vologda Oblast Location within Russia
- Coordinates: 59°31′N 36°33′E
- Country: Russia
- Region: Vologda Oblast
- District: Kaduysky District
- Time zone: UTC+3:00

Khlamovo (Russian: Хламово) is a rural locality (a village) in Semizerye Rural Settlement, Kaduysky District, Vologda Oblast, Russia. The population was 7 as of 2002.

== Geography ==
Khlamovo is located 60 km northwest of Kaduy (the district's administrative centre) by road. Savelyevskaya is the nearest rural locality.
