= Yakshinskaya =

Yakshinskaya Якшинская
- Village
- Location within Vologda Oblast Location within Russia
- Coordinates: 59°24′N 37°17′E
- Country: Russia
- Region: Vologda Oblast
- District: Kaduysky District
- Time zone: UTC+3:00

Yakshinskaya (Russian: Якшинская) is a rural locality (a village) in Semizerye Rural Settlement, Kaduysky District, Vologda Oblast, Russia. The population was 1 as of 2002.

== Geography ==
Yakshinskaya is located 42 km northeast of Kaduy (the district's administrative centre) by road. Timenskaya is the nearest rural locality.
