= Vertyagino, Vologda Oblast =

Vertyagino Вертягино
- Village
- Location within Vologda Oblast Location within Russia
- Coordinates: 59°28′N 37°03′E
- Country: Russia
- Region: Vologda Oblast
- District: Kaduysky District
- Time zone: UTC+3:00

Vertyagino (Russian: Вертягино) is a rural locality (a village) in Nikolskoye Rural Settlement, Kaduysky District, Vologda Oblast, Russia. The population was 13 as of 2002.

== Geography ==
Vertyagino is located 40 km north of Kaduy (the district's administrative centre) by road. Mikhalevo is the nearest rural locality.
