= Kapchino =

Kapchino Капчино
- Village
- Location within Vologda Oblast Location within Russia
- Coordinates: 59°16′N 36°39′E
- Country: Russia
- Region: Vologda Oblast
- District: Kaduysky District
- Time zone: UTC+3:00

Kapchino (Russian: Капчино) is a rural locality (a village) in Semizerye Rural Settlement, Kaduysky District, Vologda Oblast, Russia. The population was 28 as of 2002.

== Geography ==
Kapchino is located 37 km northwest of Kaduy (the district's administrative centre) by road. Uyta is the nearest rural locality.
