= Kholmishche =

Kholmishche Холмище
- Village
- Location within Vologda Oblast Location within Russia
- Coordinates: 59°12′N 36°58′E
- Country: Russia
- Region: Vologda Oblast
- District: Kaduysky District
- Time zone: UTC+3:00

Kholmishche (Russian: Холмище) is a rural locality (a village) in Semizerye Rural Settlement, Kaduysky District, Vologda Oblast, Russia. The population was 6 as of 2002.

== Geography ==
Kholmishche is located 13 km northwest of Kaduy (the district's administrative centre) by road. Pryamikovo is the nearest rural locality.
