= Bolshaya Rukavitskaya =

Bolshaya Rukavitskaya Большая Рукавицкая
- Village
- Location within Vologda Oblast Location within Russia
- Coordinates: 59°11′N 37°11′E
- Country: Russia
- Region: Vologda Oblast
- District: Kaduysky District
- Time zone: UTC+3:00

Bolshaya Rukavitskaya (Russian: Большая Рукавицкая) is a rural locality (a village) in Semizerye Rural Settlement, Kaduysky District, Vologda Oblast, Russia. The population was 24 as of 2002.

== Geography ==
Bolshaya Rukavitskaya is located 4 km southeast of Kaduy (the district's administrative centre) by road. Malaya Rukavitskaya is the nearest rural locality.
