= Pugino =

Pugino Пугино
- Village
- Location within Vologda Oblast Location within Russia
- Coordinates: 59°14′N 37°17′E
- Country: Russia
- Region: Vologda Oblast
- District: Kaduysky District
- Time zone: UTC+3:00

Pugino (Russian: Пугино) is a rural locality (a village) in Semizerye Rural Settlement, Kaduysky District, Vologda Oblast, Russia. The population was 2 as of 2002.

== Geography ==
Pugino is located 12 km northeast of Kaduy (the district's administrative centre) by road. Chernovo is the nearest rural locality.
