= Malaya Rukavitskaya =

Malaya Rukavitskaya Малая Рукавицкая
- Village
- Location within Vologda Oblast Location within Russia
- Coordinates: 59°11′N 37°11′E
- Country: Russia
- Region: Vologda Oblast
- District: Kaduysky District
- Time zone: UTC+3:00

Malaya Rukavitskaya (Russian: Малая Рукавицкая) is a rural locality (a village) and the administrative center of Semizerye Rural Settlement, Kaduysky District, Vologda Oblast, Russia. The population was 283 as of 2002. There are 6 streets.

== Geography ==
Malaya Rukavitskaya is located 3 km east of Kaduy (the district's administrative centre) by road. Kaduy is the nearest rural locality.
