= Smeshkovo =

Smeshkovo Смешково
- Village
- Location within Vologda Oblast Location within Russia
- Coordinates: 59°20′N 37°12′E
- Country: Russia
- Region: Vologda Oblast
- District: Kaduysky District
- Time zone: UTC+3:00

Smeshkovo (Russian: Смешково) is a rural locality (a village) in Nikolskoye Rural Settlement, Kaduysky District, Vologda Oblast, Russia. The population was 22 as of 2002.

== Geography ==
Smeshkovo is located 28 km northeast of Kaduy (the district's administrative centre) by road. Stan is the nearest rural locality.
