= Marlykovo =

Marlykovo Марлыково
- Village
- Location within Vologda Oblast Location within Russia
- Coordinates: 59°15′N 37°24′E
- Country: Russia
- Region: Vologda Oblast
- District: Kaduysky District
- Time zone: UTC+3:00

Marlykovo (Russian: Марлыково) is a rural locality (a village) in Nikolskoye Rural Settlement, Kaduysky District, Vologda Oblast, Russia. The population was 25 as of 2002.

== Geography ==
Marlykovo is located 24 km northeast of Kaduy (the district's administrative centre) by road. Krutets is the nearest rural locality.
