= Nizhniye =

Nizhniye Нижние
- Village
- Location within Vologda Oblast Location within Russia
- Coordinates: 59°17′N 36°46′E
- Country: Russia
- Region: Vologda Oblast
- District: Kaduysky District
- Time zone: UTC+3:00

Nizhniye (Russian: Нижние) is a rural locality (a village) in Semizerye Rural Settlement, Kaduysky District, Vologda Oblast, Russia. The population was 70 as of 2002.

== Geography ==
It is located 30 km northwest of Kaduy (the district's administrative centre) by road. Nizhniye (settlement) is the nearest rural locality.
