= Maly Smerdyach =

Maly Smerdyach Малый Смердяч
- Village
- Location within Vologda Oblast Location within Russia
- Coordinates: 59°08′N 37°08′E
- Country: Russia
- Region: Vologda Oblast
- District: Kaduysky District
- Time zone: UTC+3:00

Maly Smerdyach (Russian: Малый Смердяч) is a rural locality (a village) in Semizerye Rural Settlement, Kaduysky District, Vologda Oblast, Russia. The population was 15 as of 2002.

== Geography ==
Maly Smerdyach is located 8 km south of Kaduy (the district's administrative centre) by road. Bolshoy Smerdyach is the nearest rural locality.
