= Zaruchevye, Kaduysky District, Vologda Oblast =

Zaruchevye Заручевье
- Village
- Location within Vologda Oblast Location within Russia
- Coordinates: 59°29′N 36°37′E
- Country: Russia
- Region: Vologda Oblast
- District: Kaduysky District
- Time zone: UTC+3:00

Zaruchevye (Russian: Заручевье) is a rural locality (a village) in Semizerye Rural Settlement, Kaduysky District, Vologda Oblast, Russia. The population was 10 as of 2002.

== Geography ==
Zaruchevye is located 60 km northwest of Kaduy (the district's administrative centre) by road. Uspenskoye is the nearest rural locality.
