= Martyukhino =

Martyukhino Мартюхино
- Village
- Location within Vologda Oblast Location within Russia
- Coordinates: 59°23′N 37°15′E
- Country: Russia
- Region: Vologda Oblast
- District: Kaduysky District
- Time zone: UTC+3:00

Martyukhino (Russian: Мартюхино) is a rural locality (a village) in Nikolskoye Rural Settlement, Kaduysky District, Vologda Oblast, Russia. The population was 2 as of 2002.

== Geography ==
Martyukhino is located 39 km north of Kaduy (the district's administrative centre) by road. Andronovo is the nearest rural locality.
