= Volotskaya =

Volotskaya Волоцкая
- Village
- Location within Vologda Oblast Location within Russia
- Coordinates: 59°10′N 37°13′E
- Country: Russia
- Region: Vologda Oblast
- District: Kaduysky District
- Time zone: UTC+3:00

Volotskaya (Russian: Волоцкая) is a rural locality (a village) in Semizerye Rural Settlement, Kaduysky District, Vologda Oblast, Russia. The population was 11 as of 2002.

== Geography ==
Volotskaya is located 7 km southeast of Kaduy (the district's administrative centre) by road. Dubrovnoye is the nearest rural locality.
