= Zaerap =

Zaerap Заэрап
- Village
- Location within Vologda Oblast Location within Russia
- Coordinates: 59°17′N 36°37′E
- Country: Russia
- Region: Vologda Oblast
- District: Kaduysky District
- Time zone: UTC+3:00

Zaerap (Russian: Заэрап) is a rural locality (a village) in Semizerye Rural Settlement, Kaduysky District, Vologda Oblast, Russia. The population was 21 as of 2002.

== Geography ==
Zaerap is located 41 km northwest of Kaduy (the district's administrative centre) by road. Bor is the nearest rural locality.
