= Boylovo =

Boylovo Бойлово
- Village
- Location within Vologda Oblast Location within Russia
- Coordinates: 59°17′N 37°21′E
- Country: Russia
- Region: Vologda Oblast
- District: Kaduysky District
- Time zone: UTC+3:00

Boylovo (Russian: Бойлово) is a rural locality (a village) in Nikolskoye Rural Settlement, Kaduysky District, Vologda Oblast, Russia. The population was 174 as of 2002. There are 3 streets.

== Geography ==
Boylovo is located 19 km northeast of Kaduy (the district's administrative centre) by road. Zykovo is the nearest rural locality.
