= Posobkovo =

Posóbkovo Пособково
- Village
- Location within Vologda Oblast Location within Russia
- Coordinates: 59°26′N 37°13′E
- Country: Russia
- Region: Vologda Oblast
- District: Kaduysky District

Population (2010)
  - Total: 7
- Time zone: UTC+3 (MSK)
- Postal code: 162518
- Vehicle registration: 35

Posobkovo (Russian: Пособково) is a rural locality (a village) in Nikolskoye Rural Settlement, Kaduysky District, Vologda Oblast, Russia. The population was 7 as of 2010.

Until 2015, it was a part of the Andronovskoye Rural Settlement.

== Geography ==
Posobkovo is located 40 km northeast of Kaduy (the district's administrative centre) by road. Markovskaya is the nearest rural locality.
