= Maza, Vologda Oblast =

Maza Маза
- Village
- Location within Vologda Oblast Location within Russia
- Coordinates: 59°19′N 36°43′E
- Country: Russia
- Region: Vologda Oblast
- District: Kaduysky District
- Time zone: UTC+3:00

Maza (Russian: Маза) is a rural locality (a village) in Semizerye Rural Settlement, Kaduysky District, Vologda Oblast, Russia. The population was 308 as of 2002. There are 7 streets.

== Geography ==
Maza is located 34 km northwest of Kaduy (the district's administrative centre) by road. Cherepanovo is the nearest rural locality.
