= Timokhino, Kaduysky District, Vologda Oblast =

Timokhino Тимохино
- Village
- Location within Vologda Oblast Location within Russia
- Coordinates: 59°33′N 36°28′E
- Country: Russia
- Region: Vologda Oblast
- District: Kaduysky District
- Time zone: UTC+3:00

Timokhino (Russian: Тимохино) is a rural locality (a village) in Semizerye Rural Settlement, Kaduysky District, Vologda Oblast, Russia. The population was 28 as of 2002.

== Geography ==
Timokhino is located 64 km northwest of Kaduy (the district's administrative centre) by road. Turpal is the nearest rural locality.
