= Zhidelevo =

Zhidelevo Жиделево
- Village
- Location within Vologda Oblast Location within Russia
- Coordinates: 59°38′N 37°08′E
- Country: Russia
- Region: Vologda Oblast
- District: Kaduysky District
- Time zone: UTC+3:00

Zhidelevo (Russian: Жиделево) is a rural locality (a village) in Nikolskoye Rural Settlement, Kaduysky District, Vologda Oblast, Russia. The population was 8 as of 2002.

== Geography ==
Zhidelevo is located 65 km north of Kaduy (the district's administrative centre) by road. Krasnaya Zarya is the nearest rural locality.
