= Myza, Vologda Oblast =

Myza Мыза
- Village
- Location within Vologda Oblast Location within Russia
- Coordinates: 59°20′N 37°18′E
- Country: Russia
- Region: Vologda Oblast
- District: Kaduysky District
- Time zone: UTC+3:00

Myza (Russian: Мыза) is a rural locality (a village) in Nikolskoye Rural Settlement, Kaduysky District, Vologda Oblast, Russia. The population was 6 as of 2002.

== Geography ==
Myza is located 21 km northeast of Kaduy (the district's administrative centre) by road. Zhukov Pochinok is the nearest rural locality.
