= Ploskoye, Kaduysky District, Vologda Oblast =

Ploskoye Плоское
- Village
- Location within Vologda Oblast Location within Russia
- Coordinates: 59°34′N 36°57′E
- Country: Russia
- Region: Vologda Oblast
- District: Kaduysky District
- Time zone: UTC+3:00

Ploskoye (Russian: Плоское) is a rural locality (a village) in Nikolskoye Rural Settlement, Kaduysky District, Vologda Oblast, Russia. The population was 13 as of 2002.

== Geography ==
Ploskoye is located 53 km northwest of Kaduy (the district's administrative centre) by road. Krasnoye is the nearest rural locality.
