= Yakimovo, Vologda Oblast =

Yakimovo Якимово
- Village
- Location within Vologda Oblast Location within Russia
- Coordinates: 59°09′N 37°13′E
- Country: Russia
- Region: Vologda Oblast
- District: Kaduysky District
- Time zone: UTC+3:00

Yakimovo (Russian: Якимово) is a rural locality (a village) in Nikolskoye Rural Settlement, Kaduysky District, Vologda Oblast, Russia. The population was 2 as of 2002. There are 4 streets.

== Geography ==
Yakimovo is located 8 km southeast of Kaduy (the district's administrative centre) by road. Dubrovnoye is the nearest rural locality.
