= Buzykino =

Buzykino Бузыкино
- Village
- Location within Vologda Oblast Location within Russia
- Coordinates: 59°24′N 37°10′E
- Country: Russia
- Region: Vologda Oblast
- District: Kaduysky District
- Time zone: UTC+3:00

Buzykino (Russian: Бузыкино) is a rural locality (a village) in Nikolskoye Rural Settlement, Kaduysky District, Vologda Oblast, Russia. The population was 4 as of 2002.

== Geography ==
Buzykino is located 35 km north of Kaduy (the district's administrative centre) by road. Postnikovo is the nearest rural locality.
