= Zayatskoye =

Zayatskoye Заяцкое
- Settlement
- Location within Vologda Oblast Location within Russia
- Coordinates: 59°24′N 36°42′E
- Country: Russia
- Region: Vologda Oblast
- District: Kaduysky District
- Time zone: UTC+3:00

Zayatskoye (Russian: Заяцкое) is a rural locality (a settlement) in Semizerye Rural Settlement, Kaduysky District, Vologda Oblast, Russia. The population was 23 as of 2002.

== Geography ==
Zayatskoye is located 69 km northwest of Kaduy (the district's administrative centre) by road. Starostino is the nearest rural locality.
