= Russian Caviar House =

Russia's largest black caviar producer

- Founded: 1978; 48 years ago
- Founder: Alexander Novikov
- Location: Cherepovetsky District, Vologda Oblast, Russia;
- Region served: Russia
- Website: russian-caviar-house.ru

Russian Caviar House (Русский икорный дом) is a Russian group of companies that grows sturgeon and sells black caviar. It is Russia's largest producer of black caviar.

== History ==
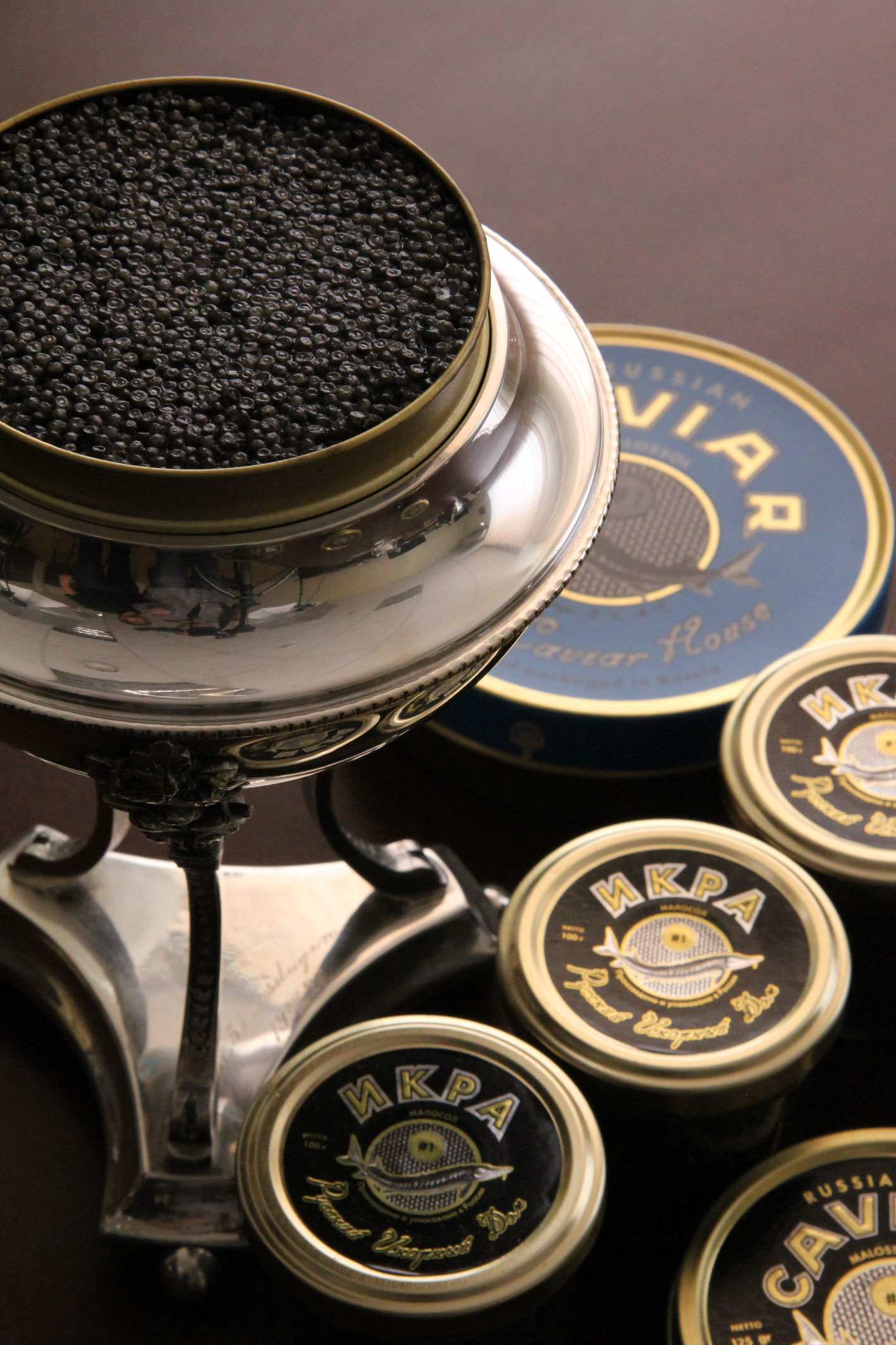
Black caviar of Russian Caviar House

The farm was established in 1978 as an experimental fish farm which belonged to ‘Vologdarybprom’ and was located on the Suda River in Vologda Oblast, closer to its source than industrial enterprises established along the river. By 1995 the company was in a pre-bankrupt state. When Alexander Novikov stepped in as the new owner in 1996, the farm found new opportunities for success, reorienting from growing carp to breeding sturgeon with a focus on black caviar.

In the 1990s the sturgeon caviar market was full of illegal fishery supplies from the Caspian Sea and expected maturity of sturgeon kept in captivity, before it had its first caviar eggs, exceeded 8 years (14 years in the wild), that is why investors refused to fund Novikov's venture. Having invested about $4 million in 1996–2000, the entrepreneur reorganized the farm, bought new equipment and began to grow fish using the modern aquaculture method.

The basis of the future broodstock was purchased at the Konakovo sturgeon plant, and small adult herds were being purchased from specialized Soviet enterprises. Before the fish began to spawn, the farm was making money selling the fish itself. It sold up to 300 tons of sturgeon annually, which brought up to $3 million of revenue per year.

In 2006, the first batch of produced caviar went on sale, and the following year the Russian authorities banned sturgeon fishing and destroyed caviar confiscated from poachers. The ban dramatically reduced the number of retail suppliers, and raised the demand for caviar obtained by the aquaculture method. In the following years the modern structure of Russian Caviar House group of companies was formed: the retail trading company of the same name, the fish company Diana, and the production and sales company Belovodye which specializes in the supply of caviar to retailers. Including the initial investment of $4 million, about $15 million were invested in the fish farming business in 1996–2011.

== Company ==
=== Production ===
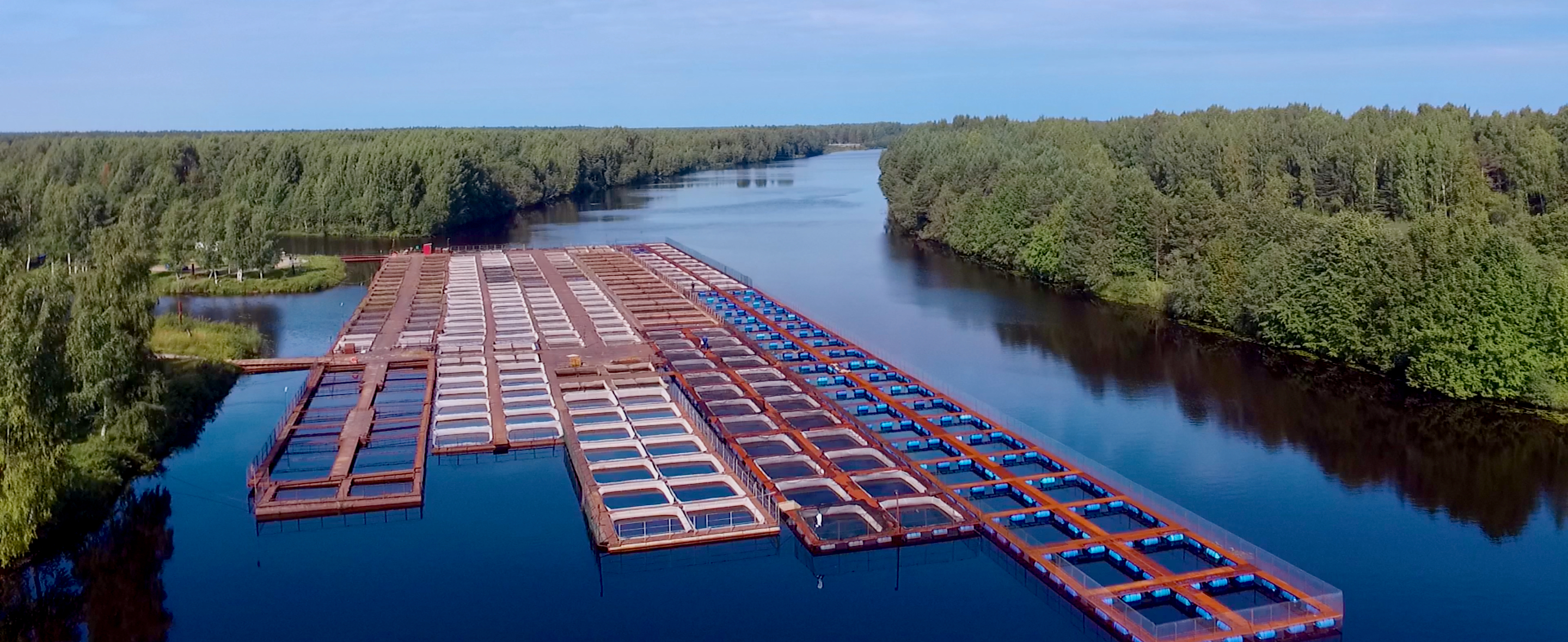
Fish cages on the river Suda

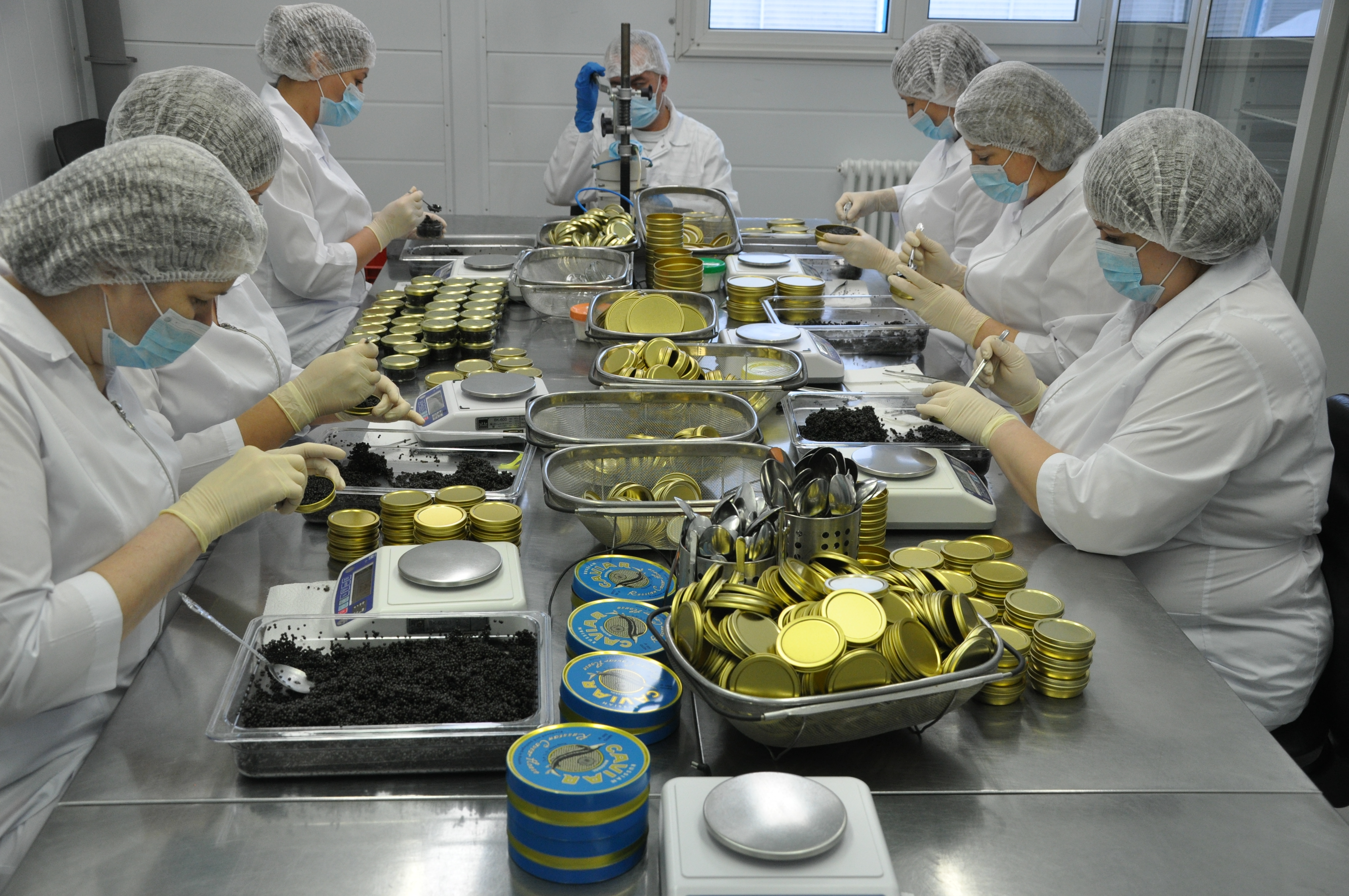
Packing department

Russian Caviar House fish farm is the largest in Russia and Europe. In 2015 the company's broodstock reached 800 tons, and the annual production of black caviar was 25 thousand kilograms, which corresponded to more than 70% of legal supplies to the Russian market. The fish bred by the company — sturgeon, beluga, starry sturgeon, sterlet and other — does not just give caviar for sale, but is also used to replenish broodstock. The company uses closed pools, the water in which is cleaned using filters, as well as live fish wells on the river Suda, in which the water remains warm all year round due to clean water from the cooling system of the Cherepovets thermal power plant.

The fish in Russian Caviar House farm undergoes a regular physical examination, including measurement, weighing, ultrasound and biopsy for viewing eggs. A unique identifier of each fish and information about its health are recorded on a chip implanted in the area of the first spike from the head. Since its first years the company has used and promoted a ‘no-kill’ method of harvesting caviar, which is called ‘milking’. Milking is carried out using aseptic technique and takes about 5 minutes: the farm staff fix the fish with its belly upside, trim its oviduct and, by massaging the fish from head to tail, pump the caviar. After surgery the fish returns to natural conditions. Over the years the company has managed to reduce the invasiveness of the procedure and reduce the mortality of fish to 1-2%. This procedure can be repeated every 2 years and keeps the broodstock alive. During the first milking, the caviar volume is about 10% of the body weight of the fish, with age it reaches 20%. On average, one fish brings 5 kilograms of caviar a year. The traditional method of killing fish makes up about 15% of production and is applied only to old and poorly growing fish in order to control livestock. After the farm caviar enters the production workshop located nearby, where it is packed and sent to stores in jars of six volumes: 1 ounce (about 28.6 grams), 50, 100, 125, 250 and 500 grams.

=== Distribution ===
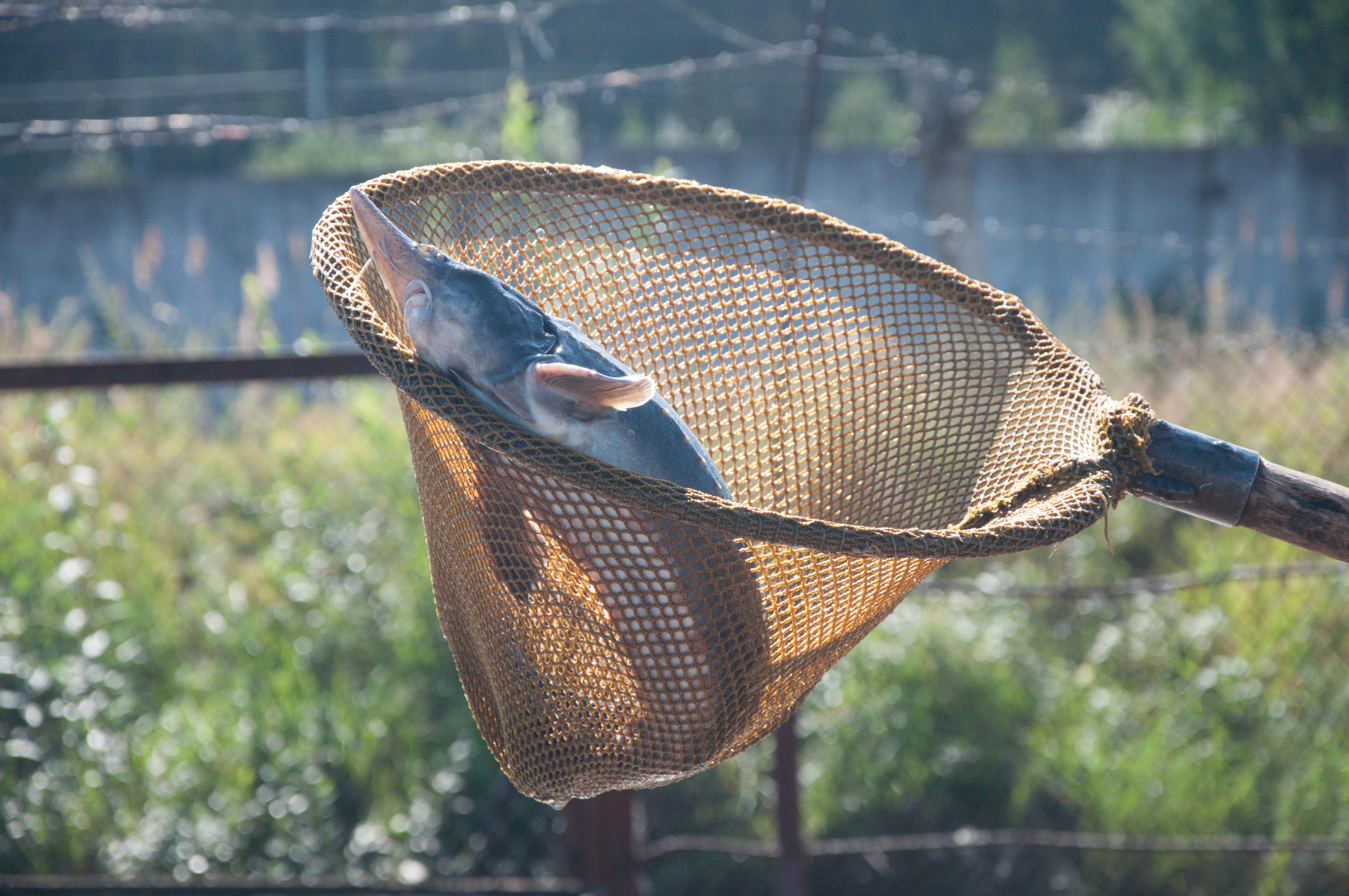
Sturgeon in a hand net

Black caviar of Russian Caviar House is represented in large retail chains, duty-free shops and its own online store, along with crab meat and fish from Arctic rivers — broad whitefish, Arctic cisco and muksun. As of 2015, the company was the only black caviar exporter in the country to have the certificate of compliance with the requirements of the CITES (Convention on International Trade in Endangered Species of Wild Fauna and Flora) necessary for passing the border. As of 2016, the company's offices worked in the United Arab Emirates, the United States, Kazakhstan, Singapore and Hong Kong (set up to enter the Chinese market). Japan and South Africa were among important export destinations as well. However, in 2016 the company could not start exporting caviar to the European Union region due to lack of regulations on the procedure and conditions for aquaculture fish farming in Russia. Export accounts for 2.5-3% of the production output, the rest of the products are sold in Russia.

According to statements by officials and information from the brochures of Russian Caviar House, the company acts as a supplier of caviar to the State Duma, the Federation Council and large state-owned companies — Rosneft, Gazprom and Sberbank of Russia. This information is partially confirmed by government contracts with a number of organizations, including the Kremlin Food Production company. This connection was discovered by journalists from Russian Forbes. The caviar of Russian Caviar House is part of the protein nutrition program for cosmonauts and it is supplied to the International Space Station. Since 2014 the company's caviar of Standard and Premium categories has been certified as the ‘Authentic Product of Vologda’ along with more well-known and traditional Vologda butter and Vologda lace.

=== Owners and management ===
The founder of Russian Caviar House, Alexander Novikov, has had entrepreneurial spirit since the Soviet times. After graduating from Moscow Geological Prospecting Institute, he worked as a geologist for some time. In 1978 he started to organize the restoration of churches for the Russian Orthodox Church, and in 1988 he founded and headed the ‘Moscow Business Center’ cooperative. Novikov imported computer equipment through the cooperative, and in the 1990s began to manage transactions based on mutual offset of liabilities. One of such deals brought Novikov into fish business: in 1995 he acquired a fish farm on the Suda River in Cherepovetsky District of Vologda Oblast.

== Other ==
Russian Caviar House initiated the establishment of the trade union of sturgeon breeders in Russia, which, on behalf of responsible producers, contributes to the development of legislation for the aquaculture fish farming industry. Novikov is the president of the trade union. In 2012, the company worked with the authorities of Vologda, providing about 100 kilograms of grass carps for cleaning ponds from aquatic plants in the VRZ park in Vologda (the so-called Kremlin garden).

Since 2014, together with the Vologda region government and the Federal Agency for Fishery, Russian Caviar House has been providing at least 10,000 young sterlets every year to be released into the Sukhona River as part of measures for the artificial reproduction of aquatic biological resources of the river.
