= Zhornovets =

Zhornovets Жорновец
- Village
- Location within Vologda Oblast Location within Russia
- Coordinates: 59°14′N 37°16′E
- Country: Russia
- Region: Vologda Oblast
- District: Kaduysky District
- Time zone: UTC+3:00

Zhornovets (Russian: Жорновец) is a rural locality (a village) in Semizerye Rural Settlement, Kaduysky District, Vologda Oblast, Russia. The population was 2 as of 2002.

== Geography ==
Zhornovets is located 10 km northeast of Kaduy (the district's administrative centre) by road. Chernovo is the nearest rural locality.
