= Nelazskoye =

Nelazskoye Нелазское
- Selo
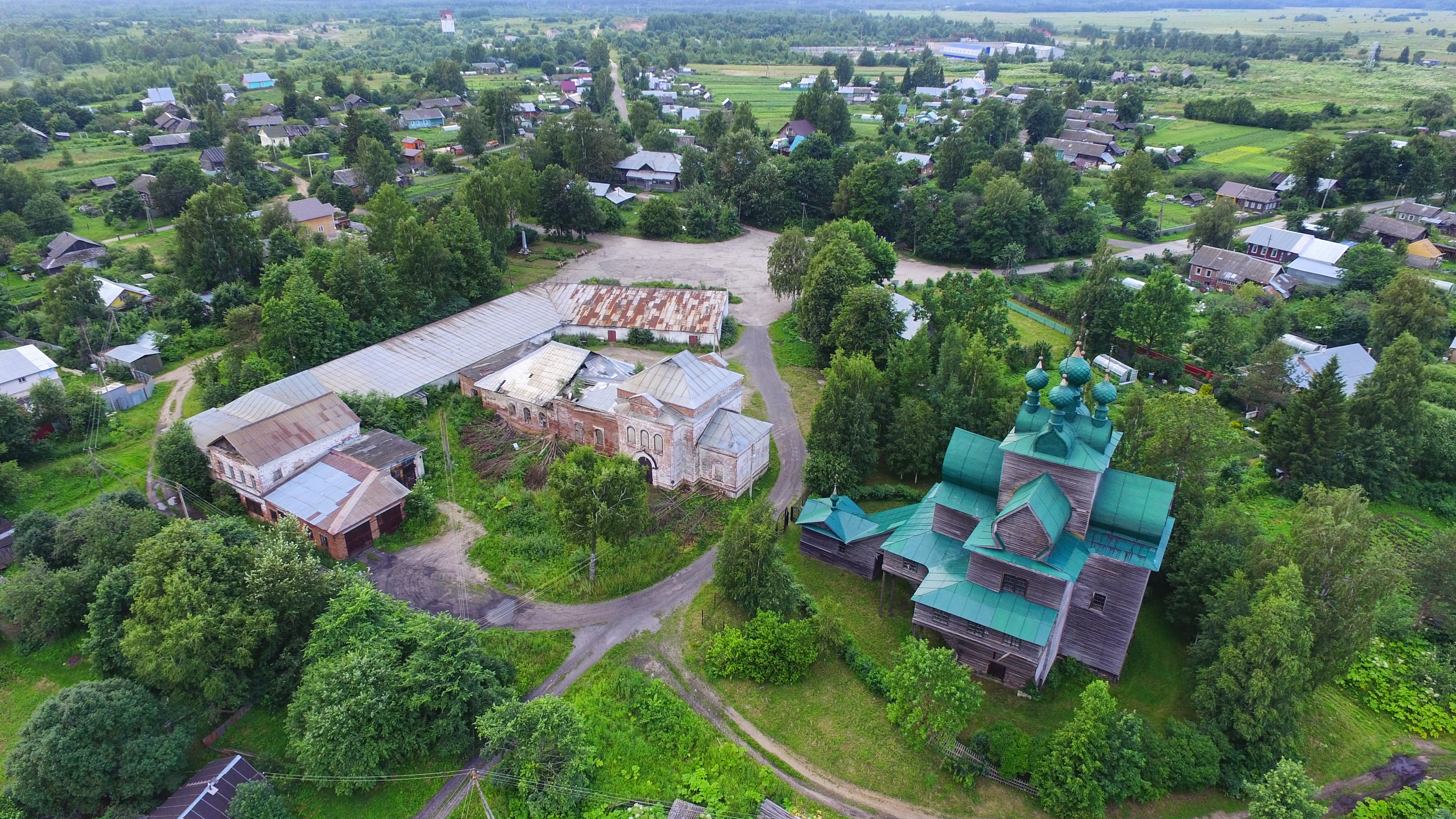

- Location within Vologda Oblast Location within Russia
- Coordinates: 59°11′N 37°38′E
- Country: Russia
- Region: Vologda Oblast
- District: Cherepovetsky District
- Time zone: UTC+3:00

Nelazskoye (Russian: Нелазское) is a rural locality (a selo) in Nelazskoye Rural Settlement, Cherepovetsky District, Vologda Oblast, Russia. The population was 258 as of 2002. There are 14 streets.

== Geography ==
Nelazskoye is located 25 km (16 mi) northwest of Cherepovets (the district's administrative centre) by road. Popovka is the nearest rural locality.
