= Khokhlovo, Kaduysky District, Vologda Oblast =

Khokhlovo Хохлово
- Urban-type settlement
- Interactive map of Khokhlovo
- Location of Khokhlovo Khokhlovo (Vologda Oblast)
- Coordinates: 59°08′51″N 37°23′22″E
- Country: Russia
- Federal subject: Vologda Oblast
- Administrative district: Kaduysky District
- First mention: 1626
- Urban-type settlement status since: 1979

Population (2010 Census)
  - Total: 2,509
  - Estimate (2023): 2,094 (−16.5%)

Municipal status
  - Municipal district: Kaduysky Municipal District
  - Urban settlement: Khokhlovskoye Urban Settlement
  - Capital of: Khokhlovskoye Urban Settlement
- Time zone: UTC+3 (MSK)
- Postal code: 162532
- OKTMO ID: 19626155051

Khokhlovo (Russian: Хохло́во) is an urban locality (a work settlement) in Kaduysky District of Vologda Oblast, Russia. Municipally, it is incorporated as Khokhlovskoye Urban Settlement, one of the two urban settlements in the district. Population: 2,509 (2010 census); 2,527 (2002 census); 2,807 (1989 Soviet census).

== History ==
Khokhlovo has been known as a village since 1626. In the 19th century, it was part of Cherepovetsky Uyezd of Novgorod Governorate. In June 1918, five uyezds of Novgorod Governorate, including Cherepovetsky Uyezd, were split off to form Cherepovets Governorate, with the administrative center in Cherepovets. On August 1, 1927 Cherepovets Governorate was abolished, and its area became Cherepovets Okrug of Leningrad Oblast. Simultaneously, uyezds were abolished, and Kaduysky District was established. On September 23, 1937, Kaduysky District was transferred to the newly established Vologda Oblast. In 1979, Khokhlovo became an urban-type settlement.

== Economy ==
=== Industry ===
There is a food industry enterprise in Ulomskoye and a sawmill, both located in Khokhlovo.

=== Transportation ===
A114 highway, connecting Vologda to Cherepovets and Saint Petersburg, runs several kilometers east of Khokhlovo, and the road connecting Kaduy with Cherepovets runs several kilometers north of the settlement.

The closest railway station, Komarikha, is located several kilometers north of Khokhlovo on the railroad connecting Vologda to Saint Petersburg via Cherepovets.
