= Kolp (Suda tributary) =

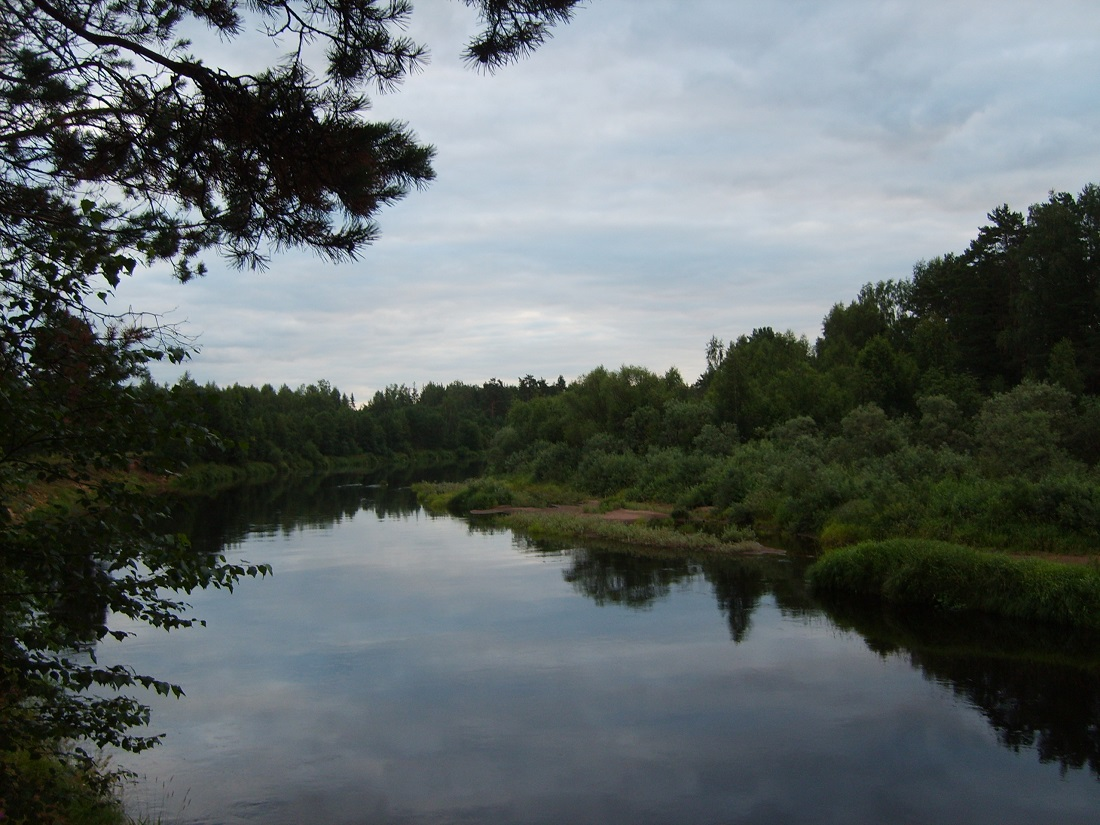

- Map of the Rybinsk Reservoir basin. The Kolp is shown on the map.

Location
- Country: Russia

Physical characteristics
- Mouth: Suda
  - coordinates: 59°19′48″N 36°49′46″E
- Length: 254 km (158 mi)
- Basin size: 3,730 km^{2} (1,440 sq mi)
- Discharge
  - average: 25.2 cubic metres per second (890 cu ft/s)

Basin features
- Progression: Suda→ Volga→ Caspian Sea

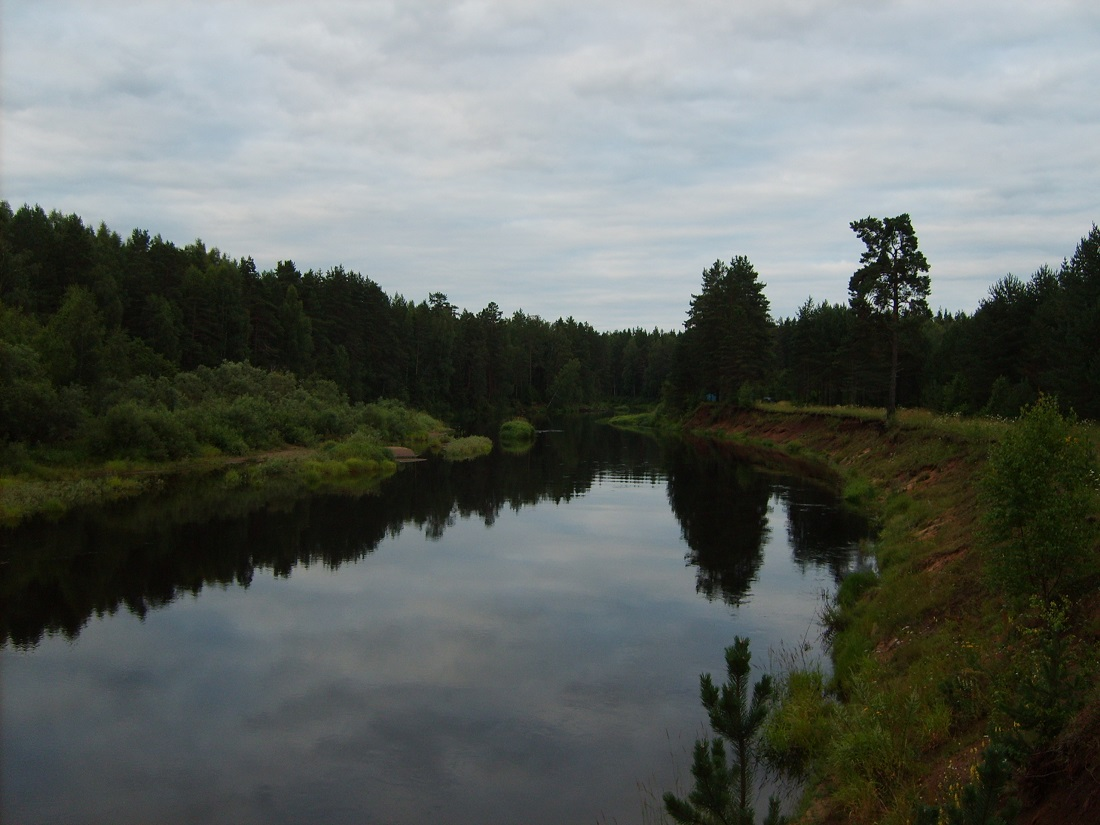
The Kolp near the village of Toropovo.

The Kolp (Russian: Колпь) is a river in Boksitogorsky District of Leningrad Oblast and in Babayevsky and Kaduysky Districts of Vologda Oblast in Russia. It is a right tributary of the Suda and belongs to the river basin of the Volga. It is 254 kilometres (158 mi) long, with a drainage basin of 3,730 square kilometres (1,440 mi^{2}) and an average discharge of 25.2 cubic metres per second (890 cu ft/s) measured 30 kilometres (19 mi) upstream from its mouth. Its main tributaries are the Vesyarka and the Krupen. The town of Babayevo is located by the Kolp.

The source of the Kolp is located in the northeast of Boksitogorsky District, close to the border with Vologda Oblast. The river flows southeast and enters Vologda Oblast. At the village of Pleso it turns southwest, reenters Leningrad Oblast, accepts the Krupen from the right, turns south and eventually southeast and reenters Vologda Oblast. Downstream from the village of Zapolye the Kolp turns northeast and enters Kaduysky District. The mouth of the Kolp is downstream of the village of Nizhniye.

The drainage basin of the Kolp comprises the northwestern part of Boksitogorsky District, the southern part of Babayevsky District, as well as some areas in Kaduysky District.
