= Andogsky =

Andogsky Андогский
- Settlement
- Location within Vologda Oblast Location within Russia
- Coordinates: 59°11′N 37°24′E
- Country: Russia
- Region: Vologda Oblast
- District: Cherepovetsky District
- Time zone: UTC+3:00

Andogsky (Russian: Андогский) is a rural locality (a settlement) in Nelazskoye Rural Settlement, Cherepovetsky District, Vologda Oblast, Russia. The population was 297 as of 2010. There are 11 streets.

== Geography ==
Andogsky is located 42 km (26 mi) northwest of Cherepovets (the district's administrative centre) by road. Krivets is the nearest rural locality.
