= Vladimirovka, Vologda Oblast =

Vladimirovka Владимировка
- Village
- Location within Vologda Oblast Location within Russia
- Coordinates: 59°10′N 37°27′E
- Country: Russia
- Region: Vologda Oblast
- District: Cherepovetsky District
- Time zone: UTC+3:00

Vladimirovka (Russian: Владимировка) is a rural locality (a village) in Sudskoye Rural Settlement, Cherepovetsky District, Vologda Oblast, Russia. The population was 42 as of 2002. There are 7 streets.

== Geography ==
Vladimirovka is located 36 km northwest of Cherepovets (the district's administrative centre) by road. Krivets is the nearest rural locality.
