= Suda (river) =

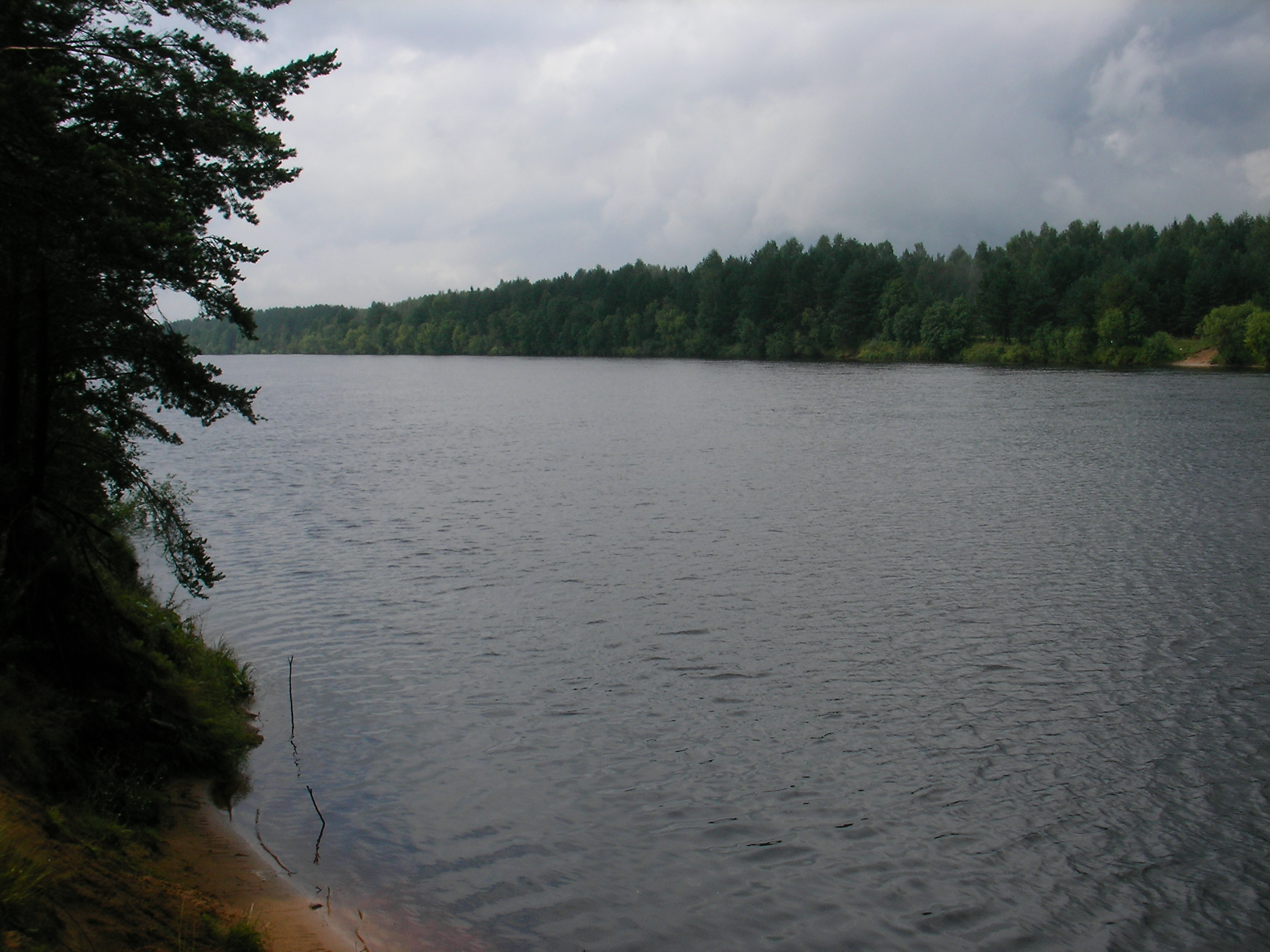

Location
- Country: Russia

Physical characteristics
- Mouth
  - location: Rybinsk Reservoir
  - coordinates: 59°07′14″N 37°43′48″E
- Length: 184 km (114 mi)
- Basin size: 13,500 km^{2} (5,200 sq mi)
- Discharge
  - average: 134 cubic metres per second (4,700 cu ft/s)

Basin features
- Progression: Rybinsk Reservoir→ Volga→ Caspian Sea
- Tributaries
  - left: Andoga
  - right: Kolp

Map of the Rybinsk Reservoir basin. The Suda is shown on the map.

The Suda (Russian: Суда) is a river in Babayevsky, Kaduysky, and Cherepovetsky Districts of Vologda Oblast in Russia. It flows into the Rybinsk Reservoir of the Volga. It is 184 kilometres (114 mi) long, with a drainage basin of 13,500 square kilometres (5,200 mi^{2}) and an average discharge of 134 cubic metres per second (4,700 cu ft/s). Its main tributaries are the Shogda, the Andoga, the Kolp, the Voron and the Petukh.

The source of the Suda is the confluence of the Koloshma and the Nozhema in the northwest of Babayevsky District of Vologda Oblast, close to the border with Leningrad Oblast. The river flows in the general direction southeast. Almost the whole valley of the Suda is populated. The selo of Borisovo-Sudskoye, located in the upper course of the river, is named after the Suda. Between 1927 and 1959 it was an administrative center of Borisovo-Sudsky District of Leningrad Oblast and of Vologda Oblast. The historic Khvalevskoye Manor is located in the selo of Borisovo-Sudskoye on a 30-meter high banks of the Suda river.

In the lower course, between the mouths of the Kolp (left) and the Andoga (right) the Suda runs close to the urban-type settlement of Kaduy, the center of Kaduysky District, located on the left bank. The mouth of the Suda is located in the settlement of Suda, and the lower course is essentially a bay of the Rybinsk Reservoir.

The river basin of the Suda comprises vast area in the west of Vologda Oblast, in particular, almost all of Babayevsky District, almost all of Kaduysky District, large areas in Belozersky and Cherepovetsky District of Vologda Oblast and in Boksitogorsky District of Leningrad Oblast, as well as minor areas in Vytegorsky and Ustyuzhensky Districts of Vologda Oblast and Tikhvinsky and Podporozhsky Districts of Leningrad Oblast. There are many lakes in the river basin of the Suda, mostly of glacial origin. The biggest of the lakes is Lake Andozero in Belozersky District.

The lower course of the Suda (22 kilometres (14 mi)) is listed in the State Water Register of Russia as navigable, however, there is no passenger navigation.

Russian Caviar House, Russia's largest producer of black caviar, uses live fish wells on the Suda, in which the water remains warm all year round due to clean water from the cooling system of the Cherepovets thermal power plant.
