= Dmitriyevo, Melenkovsky District, Vladimir Oblast =

Dmitriyevo Дмитриево
- Village
- Location within Vladimir Oblast Location within Russia
- Coordinates: 55°16′N 41°11′E
- Country: Russia
- Region: Vladimir Oblast
- District: Melenkovsky District
- Time zone: UTC+3:00

Dmitriyevo (Russian: Дмитриево) is a rural locality (a village) in Danilovskoye Rural Settlement, Melenkovsky District, Vladimir Oblast, Russia. The population was 12 as of 2010.

== Geography ==
Dmitriyevo is located on the Charmus River, 44 km (27 mi) west of Melenki (the district's administrative centre) by road. Vasilyevsky is the nearest rural locality.
