= Dmitriyevo, Kovrovsky District, Vladimir Oblast =

Dmitriyevo Дмитриево
- Village
- Location within Vladimir Oblast Location within Russia
- Coordinates: 56°12′N 41°08′E
- Country: Russia
- Region: Vladimir Oblast
- District: Kovrovsky District
- Time zone: UTC+3:00

Dmitriyevo (Russian: Дмитриево) is a rural locality (a village) in Novoselskoye Rural Settlement, Kovrovsky District, Vladimir Oblast, Russia. The population was 100 as of 2010.

== Geography ==
Dmitriyevo is located 57 km southwest of Kovrov (the district's administrative centre) by road. Sazhino is the nearest rural locality.
