= Dmitriyevo, Vologodsky District, Vologda Oblast =

Dmitriyevo Дмитриево
- Village
- Location within Vologda Oblast Location within Russia
- Coordinates: 59°15′N 39°46′E
- Country: Russia
- Region: Vologda Oblast
- District: Vologodsky District
- Time zone: UTC+3:00

Dmitriyevo (Russian: Дмитриево) is a rural locality (a village) in Mayskoye Rural Settlement, Vologodsky District, Vologda Oblast, Russia. The population was 7 as of 2002.

== Geography ==
Dmitriyevo is located 12 km northwest of Vologda (the district's administrative centre) by road. Ivlevo is the nearest rural locality.
