= Dmitriyevo, Kharovsky District, Vologda Oblast =

Dmitriyevo Дмитриево
- Village
- Location within Vologda Oblast Location within Russia
- Coordinates: 59°58′N 40°08′E
- Country: Russia
- Region: Vologda Oblast
- District: Kharovsky District
- Time zone: UTC+3:00

Dmitriyevo (Russian: Дмитриево) is a rural locality (a village) in Kharovskoye Rural Settlement, Kharovsky District, Vologda Oblast, Russia. The population was 8 as of 2002.

== Geography ==
Dmitriyevo is located 6 km northwest of Kharovsk (the district's administrative centre) by road. Perepechino is the nearest rural locality.
