= Dmitriyevo, Gus-Khrustalny District, Vladimir Oblast =

Dmitriyevo Дмитриево
- Village
- Location within Vladimir Oblast Location within Russia
- Coordinates: 55°31′N 40°55′E
- Country: Russia
- Region: Vladimir Oblast
- District: Gus-Khrustalny District
- Time zone: UTC+3:00

Dmitriyevo (Russian: Дми́триево) is a rural locality (a village) in Grigoryevskoye Rural Settlement, Gus-Khrustalny District, Vladimir Oblast, Russia. The population was 186 as of 2010.

== Geography ==
Dmitriyevo is located 29 km southeast of Gus-Khrustalny (the district's administrative centre) by road. Borisovo is the nearest rural locality.
