= Cherepovetsky District =

Cherepovetsky District Череповецкий район
- District
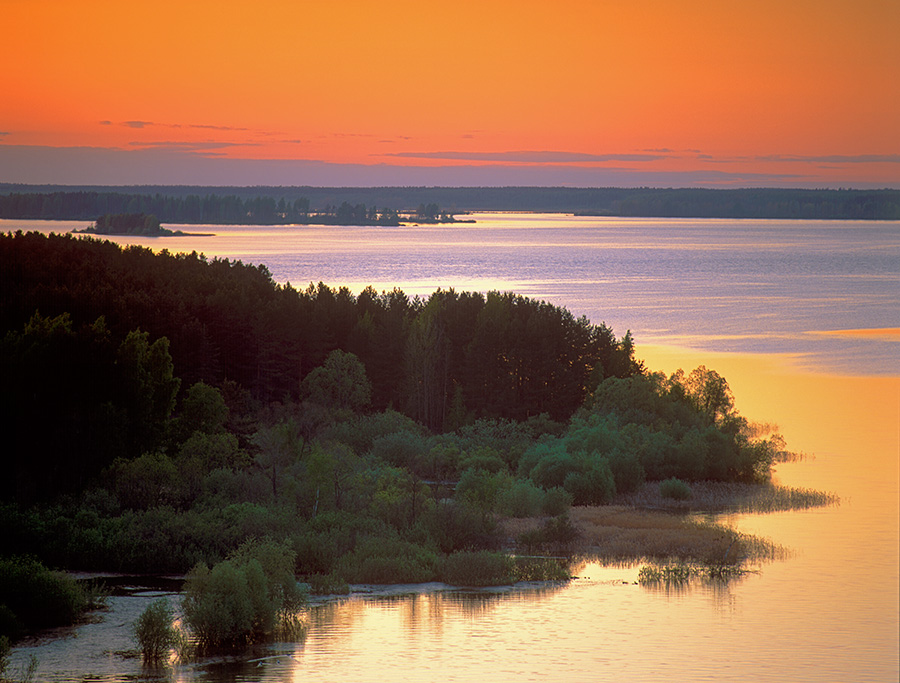

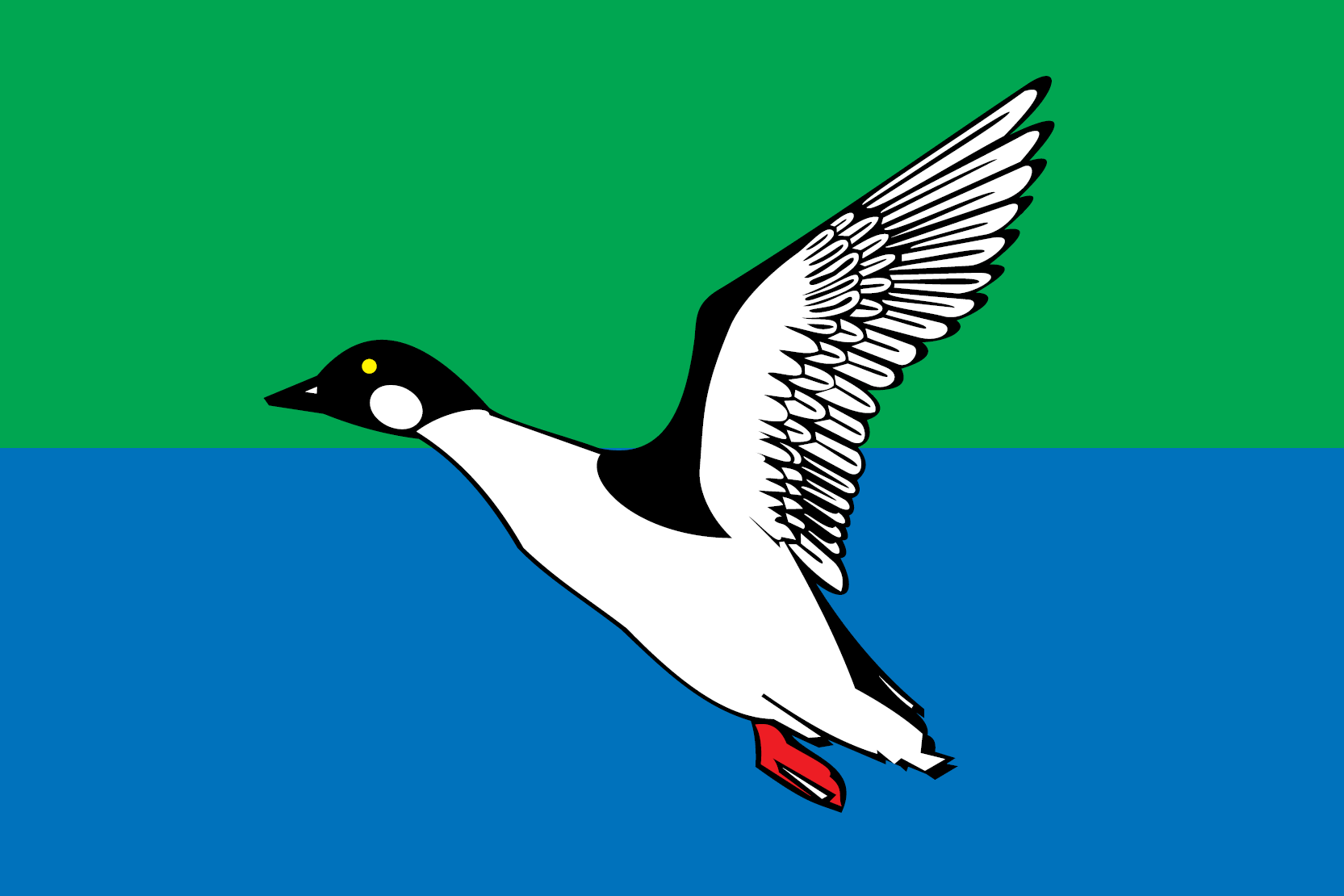
- Flag Coat of arms
- Location of Cherepovetsky District in Vologda Oblast
- Coordinates: 59°11′20″N 37°38′32″E
- Country: Russia
- Federal subject: Vologda Oblast
- Established: August 1, 1927
- Administrative center: Cherepovets

Area
  - Total: 7,640 km^{2} (2,950 sq mi)

Population (2010 Census)
  - Total: 41,025
  - Density: 5.37/km^{2} (13.9/sq mi)
  - Urban: 0%
  - Rural: 100%

Administrative structure
  - Administrative divisions: 26 Selsoviets
  - Inhabited localities: 557 rural localities

Municipal structure
  - Municipally incorporated as: Cherepovetsky Municipal District
  - Municipal divisions: 0 urban settlements, 15 rural settlements
- Time zone: UTC+3 (MSK)
- OKTMO ID: 19656000
- Website: http://www.cherra.ru/

Cherepovetsky District (Russian: Черепове́цкий райо́н) is an administrative and municipal district (raion), one of the twenty-six in Vologda Oblast, Russia. It is located in the northeast of the oblast and borders with Belozersky District in the north, Kirillovsky District in the northwest, Sheksninsky District in the east, Poshekhonsky District of Yaroslavl Oblast in the southeast, Breytovsky District of Yaroslavl Oblast in the south, Vesyegonsky District of Tver Oblast in the southwest, Ustyuzhensky District in the west, and with Kaduysky District in the northwest. The area of the district is 7,640 square kilometers (2,950 sq mi). Its administrative center is the city of Cherepovets (which is not administratively a part of the district). Population: 41,025 (2010 Census); 40,871 (2002 Census); 48,336 (1989 Soviet census).

== Geography ==
The district is Y-shaped and oriented to the south, with the Rybinsk Reservoir separating the two southern portions of the land. The whole area of the district belongs to the basin of the Volga River. The eastern part belongs to the basin of the Sheksna River and to the basins of minor rivers flowing into the Rybinsk Reservoir. The lower course of the Sheksna crosses the area of the district, and the city of Cherepovets is located in the mouth of the river. The rivers in the western part drain mostly into the Suda and its tributaries, including the Andoga. The lower course of the Suda is also located in the district. The lower course of the Mologa forms the border between Cherepovetsky and Ustyuzhensky Districts. There are many lakes in the southwestern part of the district, the biggest being Lake Kolodenskoye.

Darwin Nature Reserve, the only nature reserve in Vologda Oblast, is located in the coastal areas of the district. The nature reserve is shared with Breytovsky District of Yaroslavl Oblast.

== History ==
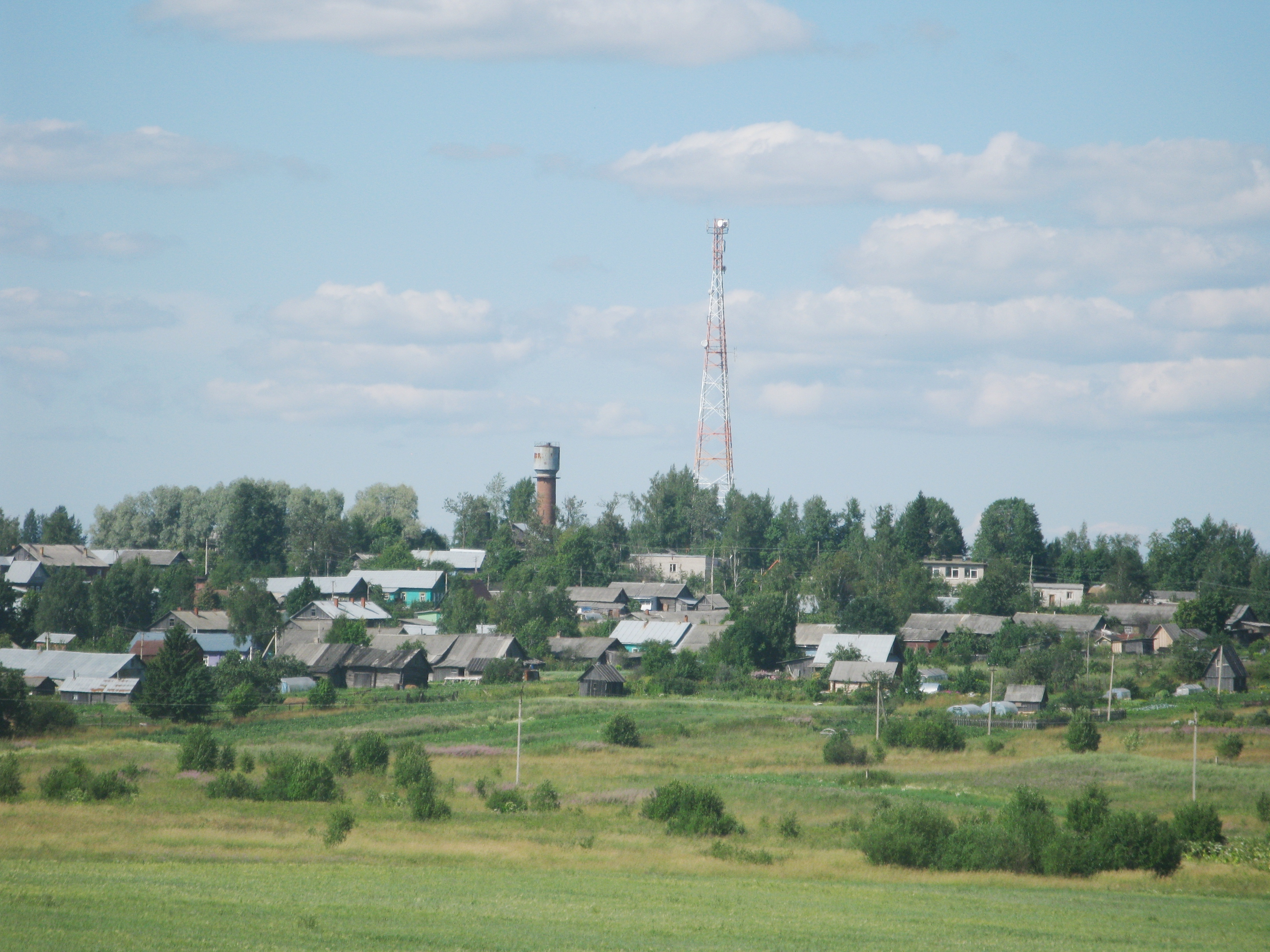
The selo of Voskresenskoye

The Sheksna was always one of the main waterways connecting central Russia with Lake Onega and with the Northern Dvina. In the 13th century, the areas along the Sheksna were controlled by the Principality of Beloozero, and in the 14th century they became a part of the Grand Duchy of Moscow. In the course of the administrative reform carried out in 1708 by Peter the Great, the east of the current area of the district was included into Ustyuzhensky Uyezd of Ingermanland Governorate (known since 1710 as Saint Petersburg Governorate). In 1727, separate Novgorod Governorate was split off. In 1776, the area was transferred to Novgorod Viceroyalty. In 1777, the town of Cherepovets was founded as a merger of several villages, and in 1802, it became the seat of Cherepovetsky Uyezd of Novgorod Governorate (into which the viceroyalty was transformed in 1796).

In June 1918, five uyezds of Novgorod Governorate, including Cherepovetsky Uyezd, were split off to form Cherepovets Governorate, with the administrative center in Cherepovets. On August 1, 1927, Cherepovets Governorate was abolished, and its area became Cherepovets Okrug of Leningrad Oblast. Simultaneously, the uyezds were abolished, and Cherepovetsky District was established with the administrative center in the city of Cherepovets. On September 23, 1937, Cherepovetsky District was transferred to newly established Vologda Oblast and remained there ever since.

On August 1, 1927, a number of other districts, which later were included into Cherepovetsky District, were also established. Abakanovsky District with the administrative center in the selo of Abakanovo was abolished in September 1931. Its territory was split between Cherepovetsky and Kaduysky Districts.

Ulomsky District with the administrative center in the village of Korotovo was abolished on September 20, 1931. Its territory was split between Cherepovetsky and Vesyegonsky Districts of Kalinin Oblast. On November 1, 1940, Ulomsky District was re-established, although it only included the territory which had been a part of Cherepovetsky District. In 1959, it was abolished and merged back into Cherepovetsky District.

Petrinyovsky District with the administrative center in the selo of Voskresenskoye was abolished on December 12, 1955. Myaksinsky District with the administrative center in the selo of Spas-Myaksa was abolished on November 12, 1960. Both districts were merged into Cherepovetsky District.

== Administrative and municipal status ==
Within the framework of administrative divisions, Cherepovetsky District is one of the twenty-six in the oblast. The city of Cherepovets serves as its administrative center, despite being incorporated separately as a city of oblast significance—an administrative unit with the status equal to that of the districts.

As a municipal division, the district is incorporated as Cherepovetsky Municipal District. The city of oblast significance of Cherepovets is incorporated separately from the district as Cherepovets Urban Okrug.

== Economy ==
=== Industry ===
In the district, there are enterprises of timber industry and food industry.

=== Agriculture ===
As of 2009, there were fifty farms (twenty-eight of them being small-scale ones) operating in the district. The district has the largest share of agricultural production of all the districts of Vologda Oblast. The main branches are the production of meat, milk, eggs, vegetables, and linum. In 2009, the district produced 35% of all meat produced in Vologda Oblast.

=== Transportation ===
A114 highway, connecting Vologda to Cherepovets and Saint Petersburg, crosses the district from east to west. Cherepovets is connected by roads with Belozersk, Kaduy, and Poshekhonye. There are also local roads.

A railway connecting Vologda with St. Petersburg crosses the district from east to west and passes through Cherepovets.

The Sheksna is navigable within the district and is a part of the Volga–Baltic Waterway (formerly known as the Mariinsk Canal System), which connects the Rybinsk Reservoir in the basin of the Volga River with Lake Onega in the basin of the Neva.

The Cherepovets Airport is located in the village of Botovo in Cherepovetsky District. The Severstal Air Company has its head office on the airport property.

== Culture and recreation ==
The district contains six cultural heritage monuments of federal significance and additionally seventeen objects classified as cultural and historical heritage of local significance. The federal monuments are the Galsky Estate and the church complex in Nelazskoye, the church complex in Dmitriyevo, and the remains of Lomsk fortress.

The Galsky Estate was restored and is currently an ethnographic museum. Another museum is located in the former Lotaryov Estate in the village of Vladimirovka. The estate belonged to Mikhail Lotaryov, an uncle of Russian poet Igor Severyanin, and Severyanin often spent time in the estate. The museum presents exhibitions on his life and literary activities.
