= Kaduy =

Index of inhabited places in Russia

Kaduy (Russian: Кадуй) is the name of several inhabited localities in Russia.

Urban localities

- Kaduy, Vologda Oblast, a work settlement in Kaduysky District of Vologda Oblast

Rural localities

- Kaduy, Irkutsk Oblast, a village in Nizhneudinsky District of Irkutsk Oblast
- Kaduy, Chuprinsky Selsoviet, Kaduysky District, Vologda Oblast, a village in Chuprinsky Selsoviet of Kaduysky District in Vologda Oblast
