= Kaduy, Vologda Oblast =

Kaduy Кадуй
- Urban-type settlement
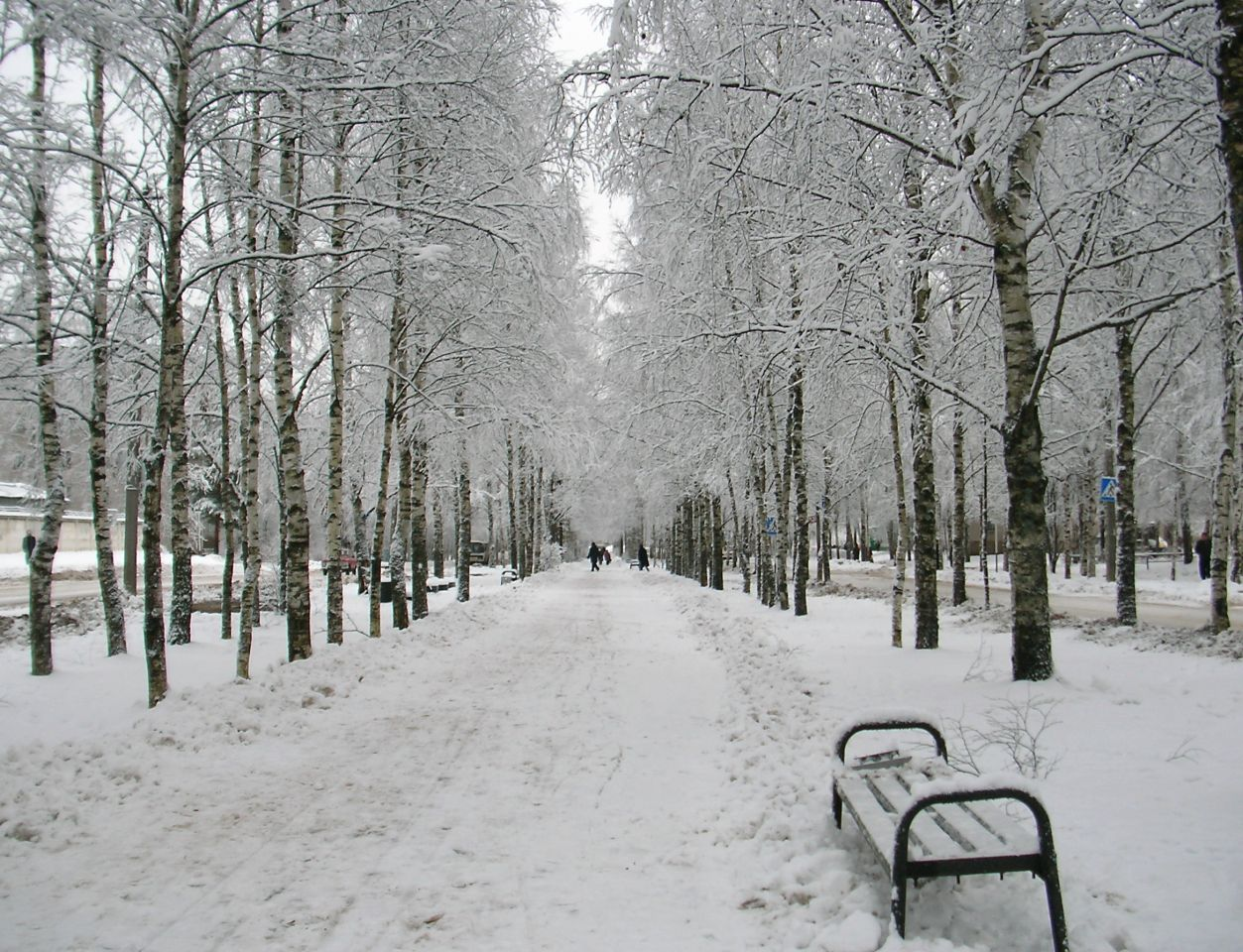
- A park built in the middle of Entuziastov Street, Kaduy
- Interactive map of Kaduy
- Location of Kaduy Kaduy (Vologda Oblast)
- Coordinates: 59°12′N 37°09′E
- Country: Russia
- Federal subject: Vologda Oblast
- Administrative district: Kaduysky District
- Founded: 1904
- Urban-type settlement status since: 1947

Population (2010 Census)
  - Total: 11,284
  - Estimate (2023): 11,373 (+0.8%)

Administrative status
  - Capital of: Kaduysky District

Municipal status
  - Municipal district: Kaduysky Municipal District
  - Urban settlement: Kaduysky Urban Settlement
  - Capital of: Kaduysky Urban Settlement
- Time zone: UTC+3 (MSK)
- Postal codes: 162510, 162512
- OKTMO ID: 19626151051

Kaduy (Russian: Ка́дуй) is an urban locality (a work settlement) and the administrative center of Kaduysky District of Vologda Oblast, Russia, located on the Voron River (a right tributary of the Suda) at the confluence with the Sivets River, 56 kilometers (35 mi) west of the city of Cherepovets. Municipally, it is incorporated as Kaduyskoye Urban Settlement, one of the two urban settlements in the district. Population: 11,284 (2010 census); 11,798 (2002 census); 11,153 (1989 Soviet census).

== History ==
The first mention of the village "Kaduy" was recorded in 1626.

Kaduy was founded in 1904 as the settlement around a station on the railway connecting Vologda and Saint Petersburg The actual traffic was open in 1906. At the time, Kaduy was located in Cherepovetsky Uyezd of Novgorod Governorate.

In June 1918, five uyezds of Novgorod Governorate, including Cherepovetsky Uyezds, were split off to form Cherepovets Governorate, with the administrative center in Cherepovets. On August 1, 1927 Cherepovets Governorate was abolished, and its area became Cherepovets Okrug of Leningrad Oblast. Simultaneously, uyezds were abolished, and Kaduysky District with the center in Kaduy was established. On September 23, 1937 Kaduysky District was transferred to newly established Vologda Oblast.

In 1947, Kaduy got the status of an urban-type settlement.

== Economy ==
=== Industry ===
There are enterprises of timber industry and food industry in Kaduy.

=== Transportation ===
The railroad connecting Vologda to Saint Petersburg via Cherepovets passes through Kaduy. There is a railway station in the settlement, which was, in fact, founded as a settlement around the railway station.

Kaduy is connect by road with Cherepovets, and another road runs north to the village of Velikoye and further to the village of Vizma in Belozersky District. There is local bus traffic.

== Culture and recreation ==
The Kaduysky District Museum is located in Kaduy. The museum opened in 2000, but previously functioned since the 1970s as a school museum, founded by Alexander Yukov. The museum currently is named after him.
