= Kaduysky District =

Kaduysky District Кадуйский район (Russian)
- District
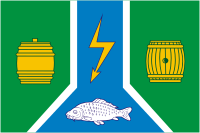
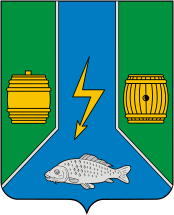
- Flag Coat of arms
- Location of Kaduysky District in Vologda Oblast
- Coordinates: 59°12′N 37°09′E
- Country: Russia
- Federal subject: Vologda Oblast
- Established: August 1, 1927
- Administrative center: Kaduy

Area
  - Total: 3,300 km^{2} (1,300 sq mi)

Population (2010 Census)
  - Total: 17,109
  - Density: 5.2/km^{2} (13/sq mi)
  - Urban: 80.6%
  - Rural: 19.4%

Administrative structure
  - Administrative divisions: 2 Urban-type settlements, 7 Selsoviets
  - Inhabited localities: 2 urban-type settlements, 199 rural localities

Municipal structure
  - Municipally incorporated as: Kaduysky Municipal District
  - Municipal divisions: 2 urban settlements, 6 rural settlements
- Time zone: UTC+3 (MSK)
- OKTMO ID: 19626000
- Website: http://www.kaduyadm.ru/

Kaduysky District (Russian: Ка́дуйский райо́н) is an administrative and municipal district (raion), one of the twenty-six in Vologda Oblast, Russia. It is located in the west of the oblast and borders with Belozersky District in the north, Cherepovetsky District in the east and in the south, Ustyuzhensky District in the southwest, and with Babayevsky District in the west. The area of the district is 3,300 square kilometers (1,300 sq mi). Its administrative center is the urban locality (a work settlement) of Kaduy. Population: 17,109 (2010 census); 18,653 (2002 Census); 19,988 (1989 Soviet census). The population of Kaduy accounts for 66.0% of the district's total population.

== Geography ==
The district lies completely in the basin of the Suda River. The main tributaries of the Suda within the district are the Kolp and the Andoga. The Suda crosses the district from northwest to southeast, and most of the rivers in the district flow in the same direction. The lower course of the Suda inside the district became a part of the Rybinsk Reservoir. The area of the district is covered by forests.

== History ==
The area was colonized in the 13th century when it belonged to the Principality of Beloozero. In the 14th century, it became a part of the Grand Duchy of Moscow. In the 16th century, the Andoga River was notable for the fishery, and zander from the Andoga was sent to the Tsar. At the same time, first regular settlements appeared. The area at the time was referred to as Andogsky Stan.

In the course of the administrative reform carried out in 1708 by Peter the Great, the area was included into Ingermanland Governorate (known since 1710 as Saint Petersburg Governorate). In 1727, separate Novgorod Governorate was split off. In 1776, the area was transferred to Novgorod Viceroyalty. In 1796, the viceroyalty was abolished, and the area was transferred to Novgorod Governorate. The current area of the district was split between Belozersky Uyezd and Cherepovetsky Uyezd. Kaduy was founded in 1904 as a railway station settlement.

In June 1918, five uyezds of Novgorod Governorate, including Belozersky and Cherepovetsky Uyezds, were split off to form Cherepovets Governorate with the administrative center in Cherepovets. On August 1, 1927, Cherepovets Governorate was abolished, and its territory became Cherepovets Okrug of Leningrad Oblast. Simultaneously, the uyezds were abolished, and Kaduysky District was established. On September 23, 1937, Kaduysky District was transferred to newly established Vologda Oblast.

On August 1, 1927, Abakanovsky District with the administrative center in the selo of Abakanovo was also established. In September 1931, Abakanovsky District was abolished and split between Cherepovetsky and Kaduysky Districts.

== Economy ==
=== Industry ===
There are enterprises of timber industry and food industry in the district, as well as peat production.

=== Agriculture ===
The main branch of agriculture in the district is cattle breeding with milk and meat production.

=== Transportation ===
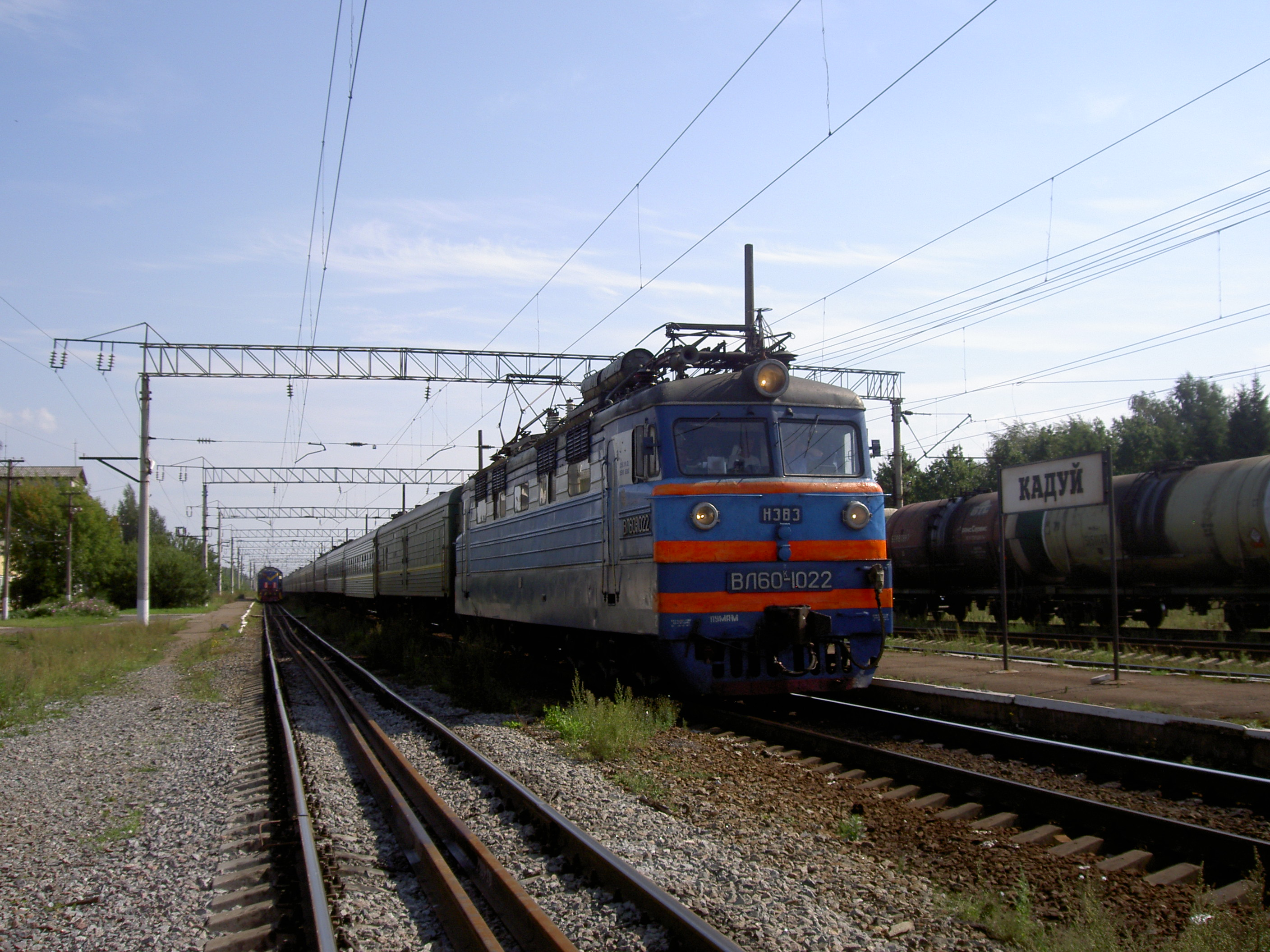
Kaduy railway station

The railroad connecting Vologda to Saint Petersburg via Cherepovets crosses the southern part of the district from east to west. The main railway stations within the district is Kaduy.

A114 highway, connecting Vologda to Cherepovets and Saint Petersburg, crosses the eastern corner of the district, passing close to the urban-type settlement of Khokhlovo. Kaduy is connected by road with Cherepovets, and another road runs north to the selo of Velikoye and further to the settlement of Vizma in Belozersky District. There is local bus traffic.

== Culture and recreation ==
The Kaduysky District Museum is located in Kaduy. The museum opened in 2000, but previously functioned since the 1970s as a school museum, founded by Alexander Yukov. The museum is now named after him.
