= Bor, Russia =

Bor (Russian: Бор) is the name of several inhabited localities in Russia.

== Arkhangelsk Oblast ==
As of 2010, thirteen rural localities in Arkhangelsk Oblast bear this name:

- Bor, Kargopolsky District, Arkhangelsk Oblast, a village in Oshevensky Selsoviet of Kargopolsky District
- Bor, Khavrogorsky Selsoviet, Kholmogorsky District, Arkhangelsk Oblast, a village in Khavrogorsky Selsoviet of Kholmogorsky District
- Bor, Lomonosovsky Selsoviet, Kholmogorsky District, Arkhangelsk Oblast, a village in Lomonosovsky Selsoviet of Kholmogorsky District
- Bor, Ukhtostrovsky Selsoviet, Kholmogorsky District, Arkhangelsk Oblast, a village in Ukhtostrovsky Selsoviet of Kholmogorsky District
- Bor, Konoshsky District, Arkhangelsk Oblast, a village in Tavrengsky Selsoviet of Konoshsky District
- Bor, Lensky Selsoviet, Lensky District, Arkhangelsk Oblast, a village in Lensky Selsoviet of Lensky District
- Bor, Sukhodolsky Selsoviet, Lensky District, Arkhangelsk Oblast, a village in Sukhodolsky Selsoviet of Lensky District
- Bor, Mezensky District, Arkhangelsk Oblast, a village in Lampozhensky Selsoviet of Mezensky District
- Bor, Nyandomsky District, Arkhangelsk Oblast, a village in Moshinsky Selsoviet of Nyandomsky District
- Bor, Primorsky District, Arkhangelsk Oblast, a village in Lyavlensky Selsoviet of Primorsky District
- Bor, Ustyansky District, Arkhangelsk Oblast, a khutor in Bereznitsky Selsoviet of Ustyansky District
- Bor, Gorkovsky Selsoviet, Verkhnetoyemsky District, Arkhangelsk Oblast, a village in Gorkovsky Selsoviet of Verkhnetoyemsky District
- Bor, Vyysky Selsoviet, Verkhnetoyemsky District, Arkhangelsk Oblast, a village in Vyysky Selsoviet of Verkhnetoyemsky District

== Irkutsk Oblast ==
As of 2010, one rural locality in Irkutsk Oblast bears this name:

- Bor, Irkutsk Oblast, a village in Kirensky District

== Kaluga Oblast ==
As of 2010, one rural locality in Kaluga Oblast bears this name:

- Bor, Kaluga Oblast, a selo in Zhukovsky District

== Republic of Karelia ==
As of 2010, one rural locality in the Republic of Karelia bears this name:

- Bor, Republic of Karelia, a village in Medvezhyegorsky District

== Kirov Oblast ==
As of 2010, three rural localities in Kirov Oblast bear this name:

- Bor (settlement), Borsky Rural Okrug, Afanasyevsky District, Kirov Oblast, a settlement in Borsky Rural Okrug of Afanasyevsky District
- Bor (village), Borsky Rural Okrug, Afanasyevsky District, Kirov Oblast, a village in Borsky Rural Okrug of Afanasyevsky District
- Bor, Slobodskoy District, Kirov Oblast, a pochinok in Ilyinsky Rural Okrug of Slobodskoy District

== Komi Republic ==
As of 2010, one rural locality in the Komi Republic bears this name:

- Bor, Komi Republic, a village in Ust-Tsilma Selo Administrative Territory of Ust-Tsilemsky District

== Kostroma Oblast ==
As of 2010, one rural locality in Kostroma Oblast bears this name:

- Bor, Kostroma Oblast, a settlement in Nikolo-Polomskoye Settlement of Parfenyevsky District

== Krasnoyarsk Krai ==
As of 2010, two rural localities in Krasnoyarsk Krai bear this name:

- Bor, Birilyussky District, Krasnoyarsk Krai, a village in Protochensky Selsoviet of Birilyussky District
- Bor, Turukhansky District, Krasnoyarsk Krai, a settlement in Borsky Selsoviet of Turukhansky District

== Leningrad Oblast ==
As of 2010, eighteen rural localities in Leningrad Oblast bear this name:

- Bor, Borskoye Settlement Municipal Formation, Boksitogorsky District, Leningrad Oblast, a village in Borskoye Settlement Municipal Formation of Boksitogorsky District
- Bor, Radogoshchinskoye Settlement Municipal Formation, Boksitogorsky District, Leningrad Oblast, a logging depot settlement in Radogoshchinskoye Settlement Municipal Formation of Boksitogorsky District
- Bor, Gatchinsky District, Leningrad Oblast, a village in Pudomyagskoye Settlement Municipal Formation of Gatchinsky District
- Bor, Kirishsky District, Leningrad Oblast, a village in Glazhevskoye Settlement Municipal Formation of Kirishsky District
- Bor, Kirovsky District, Leningrad Oblast, a village in Sukhovskoye Settlement Municipal Formation of Kirovsky District
- Bor, Alekhovshchinskoye Settlement Municipal Formation, Lodeynopolsky District, Leningrad Oblast, a village in Alekhovshchinskoye Settlement Municipal Formation of Lodeynopolsky District
- Bor, Alekhovshchinskoye Settlement Municipal Formation, Lodeynopolsky District, Leningrad Oblast, a village in Alekhovshchinskoye Settlement Municipal Formation of Lodeynopolsky District
- Bor, Dzerzhinskoye Settlement Municipal Formation, Luzhsky District, Leningrad Oblast, a village in Dzerzhinskoye Settlement Municipal Formation of Luzhsky District
- Bor, Retyunskoye Settlement Municipal Formation, Luzhsky District, Leningrad Oblast, a village in Retyunskoye Settlement Municipal Formation of Luzhsky District
- Bor, Yam-Tesovskoye Settlement Municipal Formation, Luzhsky District, Leningrad Oblast, a village in Yam-Tesovskoye Settlement Municipal Formation of Luzhsky District
- Bor, Slantsevsky District, Leningrad Oblast, a village in Staropolskoye Settlement Municipal Formation of Slantsevsky District
- Bor, Tikhvinsky District, Leningrad Oblast, a village in Borskoye Settlement Municipal Formation of Tikhvinsky District
- Bor, Khvalovskoye Settlement Municipal Formation, Volkhovsky District, Leningrad Oblast, a village in Khvalovskoye Settlement Municipal Formation of Volkhovsky District
- Bor, Kolchanovskoye Settlement Municipal Formation, Volkhovsky District, Leningrad Oblast, a village in Kolchanovskoye Settlement Municipal Formation of Volkhovsky District
- Bor, Pashskoye Settlement Municipal Formation, Volkhovsky District, Leningrad Oblast, a village in Pashskoye Settlement Municipal Formation of Volkhovsky District
- Bor, Vyndinoostrovskoye Settlement Municipal Formation, Volkhovsky District, Leningrad Oblast, a village in Vyndinoostrovskoye Settlement Municipal Formation of Volkhovsky District
- Bor, Vsevolozhsky District, Leningrad Oblast, a village in Koltushskoye Settlement Municipal Formation of Vsevolozhsky District
- Bor, Vyborgsky District, Leningrad Oblast, a logging depot settlement under the administrative jurisdiction of Kamennogorskoye Settlement Municipal Formation of Vyborgsky District

== Moscow Oblast ==
As of 2010, one rural locality in Moscow Oblast bears this name:

- Bor, Moscow Oblast, a village in Shemetovskoye Rural Settlement of Sergiyevo-Posadsky District

== Nizhny Novgorod Oblast ==
As of 2010, two inhabited localities in Nizhny Novgorod Oblast bear this name.

Urban localities

- Bor, Nizhny Novgorod Oblast, a town of oblast significance

Rural localities

- Bor, Lyskovsky District, Nizhny Novgorod Oblast, a settlement in Valkovsky Selsoviet of Lyskovsky District

== Novgorod Oblast ==
As of 2010, seventeen rural localities in Novgorod Oblast bear this name:

- Bor, Moykinskoye Settlement, Batetsky District, Novgorod Oblast, a village in Moykinskoye Settlement of Batetsky District
- Bor, Peredolskoye Settlement, Batetsky District, Novgorod Oblast, a village in Peredolskoye Settlement of Batetsky District
- Bor, Borovichsky District, Novgorod Oblast, a village in Volokskoye Settlement of Borovichsky District
- Bor, Lyubytino, Lyubytinsky District, Novgorod Oblast, a village under the administrative jurisdiction of the urban-type settlement of Lyubytino, Lyubytinsky District
- Bor, Nebolchi, Lyubytinsky District, Novgorod Oblast, a village under the administrative jurisdiction of the urban-type settlement of Nebolchi, Lyubytinsky District
- Bor, Malovishersky District, Novgorod Oblast, a village in Burginskoye Settlement of Malovishersky District
- Bor, Molvotitskoye Settlement, Maryovsky District, Novgorod Oblast, a village in Molvotitskoye Settlement of Maryovsky District
- Bor, Velilskoye Settlement, Maryovsky District, Novgorod Oblast, a village in Velilskoye Settlement of Maryovsky District
- Bor, Moshenskoy District, Novgorod Oblast, a village in Kirovskoye Settlement of Moshenskoy District
- Bor, Novgorodsky District, Novgorod Oblast, a village under the administrative jurisdiction of the urban-type settlement of Proletariy, Novgorodsky District
- Bor, Okulovsky District, Novgorod Oblast, a village in Borovenkovskoye Settlement of Okulovsky District
- Bor, Parfinsky District, Novgorod Oblast, a village in Fedorkovskoye Settlement of Parfinsky District
- Bor, Pestovsky District, Novgorod Oblast, a village in Ustyutskoye Settlement of Pestovsky District
- Bor, Shimsky District, Novgorod Oblast, a village under the administrative jurisdiction of the urban-type settlement of Shimsk, Shimsky District
- Bor, Novoselskoye Settlement, Starorussky District, Novgorod Oblast, a village in Novoselskoye Settlement of Starorussky District
- Bor, Zaluchskoye Settlement, Starorussky District, Novgorod Oblast, a village in Zaluchskoye Settlement of Starorussky District
- Bor, Valdaysky District, Novgorod Oblast, a village in Korotskoye Settlement of Valdaysky District

== Novosibirsk Oblast ==
As of 2010, one rural locality in Novosibirsk Oblast bears this name:

- Bor, Novosibirsk Oblast, a settlement in Bolotninsky District

== Perm Krai ==
As of 2010, three rural localities in Perm Krai bear this name:

- Bor, Ilyinsky District, Perm Krai, a village in Ilyinsky District
- Bor, Sivinsky District, Perm Krai, a village in Sivinsky District
- Bor, Suksunsky District, Perm Krai, a selo in Suksunsky District

== Pskov Oblast ==
As of 2010, seven rural localities in Pskov Oblast bear this name:

- Bor, Loknyansky District, Pskov Oblast, a village in Loknyansky District
- Bor, Novosokolnichesky District, Pskov Oblast, a village in Novosokolnichesky District
- Bor, Opochetsky District, Pskov Oblast, a village in Opochetsky District
- Bor, Plyussky District, Pskov Oblast, a village in Plyussky District
- Bor, Porkhovsky District, Pskov Oblast, a village in Porkhovsky District
- Bor, Usvyatsky District, Pskov Oblast, a village in Usvyatsky District
- Bor, Velikoluksky District, Pskov Oblast, a village in Velikoluksky District

== Smolensk Oblast ==
As of 2010, three rural localities in Smolensk Oblast bear this name:

- Bor, Pochinkovsky District, Smolensk Oblast, a village in Shmakovskoye Rural Settlement of Pochinkovsky District
- Bor, Rudnyansky District, Smolensk Oblast, a village in Klyarinovskoye Rural Settlement of Rudnyansky District
- Bor, Smolensky District, Smolensk Oblast, a village in Novoselskoye Rural Settlement of Smolensky District

== Sverdlovsk Oblast ==
As of 2010, one rural locality in Sverdlovsk Oblast bears this name:

- Bor, Sverdlovsk Oblast, a village in Talitsky District

== Tver Oblast ==
As of 2010, twelve rural localities in Tver Oblast bear this name:

- Bor, Belsky District, Tver Oblast, a village in Belsky District
- Bor, Bologovsky District, Tver Oblast, a village in Bologovsky District
- Bor, Kalininsky District, Tver Oblast, a village in Kalininsky District
- Bor, Kuvshinovsky District, Tver Oblast, a village in Kuvshinovsky District
- Bor, Likhoslavlsky District, Tver Oblast, a village in Likhoslavlsky District
- Bor, Nelidovsky District, Tver Oblast, a village in Nelidovsky District
- Bor, Nelidovsky District, Tver Oblast, a village in Nelidovsky District
- Bor, Toropetsky District, Tver Oblast, a village in Toropetsky District
- Bor, Torzhoksky District, Tver Oblast, a settlement in Torzhoksky District
- Bor, Vesyegonsky District, Tver Oblast, a village in Vesyegonsky District
- Bor, Vyshnevolotsky District, Tver Oblast, a village in Vyshnevolotsky District
- Bor, Zapadnodvinsky District, Tver Oblast, a village in Zapadnodvinsky District

== Tyumen Oblast ==
As of 2010, one rural locality in Tyumen Oblast bears this name:

- Bor, Tyumen Oblast, a village in Maransky Rural Okrug of Yarkovsky District

== Vologda Oblast ==
As of 2010, eight rural localities in Vologda Oblast bear this name:

- Bor, Cherepovetsky District, Vologda Oblast, a village in Nikolo-Ramensky Selsoviet of Cherepovetsky District
- Bor, Kaduysky District, Vologda Oblast, a village in Mazsky Selsoviet of Kaduysky District
- Bor, Kharovsky District, Vologda Oblast, a village in Kharovsky Selsoviet of Kharovsky District
- Bor, Nyuksensky District, Vologda Oblast, a village in Kosmarevsky Selsoviet of Nyuksensky District
- Bor, Totemsky District, Vologda Oblast, a village in Manylovsky Selsoviet of Totemsky District
- Bor, Ust-Kubinsky District, Vologda Oblast, a village in Nikolsky Selsoviet of Ust-Kubinsky District
- Bor, Velikoustyugsky District, Vologda Oblast, a village in Pokrovsky Selsoviet of Velikoustyugsky District
- Bor, Vozhegodsky District, Vologda Oblast, a village in Beketovsky Selsoviet of Vozhegodsky District

== Voronezh Oblast ==
As of 2010, two rural localities in Voronezh Oblast bear this name:

- Bor, Nizhnedevitsky District, Voronezh Oblast, a selo in Nizhnedevitskoye Rural Settlement of Nizhnedevitsky District
- Bor, Ramonsky District, Voronezh Oblast, a settlement under the administrative jurisdiction of Ramonskoye Urban Settlement of Ramonsky District

== Yaroslavl Oblast ==
As of 2010, three rural localities in Yaroslavl Oblast bear this name:

- Bor, Nekouzsky District, Yaroslavl Oblast, a village in Vereteysky Rural Okrug of Nekouzsky District
- Bor, Nekrasovsky District, Yaroslavl Oblast, a village in Borovskoy Rural Okrug of Nekrasovsky District
- Bor, Yaroslavsky District, Yaroslavl Oblast, a village in Pestretsovsky Rural Okrug of Yaroslavsky District
