= Administrative divisions of Novgorod Oblast =

Administrative districts of Russian federal subject

Novgorod Oblast Russia
- Administrative center: Novgorod

Administrative structure (as of 2015)
- Districts: 21
- Cities/towns: 10
- Urban-type settlements: 14
- Selsovets: 114

Municipal structure (as of 2002)
- Rural settlements: 3,793 (inhabited); 460 (uninhabited)

Administratively, Novgorod Oblast is divided into three cities and towns of oblast significance and twenty-one districts.

In terms of the population, the biggest administrative district is Novgorodsky District (57,685 in 2010), the smallest ones are Poddorsky District (4,645) and Maryovsky District (4,673).

In terms of the area, the biggest administrative districts are Novgorodsky District (4,600 square kilometres (1,800 mi^{2})) and Lyubytinsky District (4,500 square kilometres (1,700 mi^{2})), the smallest one is Volotovsky District (995 square kilometres (384 mi^{2})).

== Administrative and municipal divisions ==
Map

| Division | Structure | | OKATO | OKTMO | Urban-type settlement/ district-level town* | Rural |
| Division | Administrative | Municipal | OKATO | OKTMO | Urban-type settlement/ district-level town* | Rural |
|---|---|---|---|---|---|---|
| Veliky Novgorod (Великий Новгород) | city | urban okrug | 49 401 | 49 701 | | |
| Borovichi (Боровичи) | city | (under Borovichsky) | 49 408 | 49 606 | | |
| Staraya Russa (Старая Русса) | city | (under Starorussky) | 49 413 | 49 639 | | |
| Batetsky (Батецкий) | district | | 49 203 | 49 603 | | 3 settlements |
| Borovichsky (Боровичский) | district | | 49 206 | 49 606 | | 10 settlements |
| Valdaysky (Валдайский) | district | | 49 208 | 49 608 | Valday (Валдай) town* | 9 settlements |
| Volotovsky (Волотовский) | district | okrug | 49 210 | 49 610 | | 5 settlements |
| Demyansky (Демянский) | district | | 49 212 | 49 612 | Demyansk (Демянск) | 7 settlements |
| Krestetsky (Крестецкий) | district | | 49 214 | 49 614 | Kresttsy (Крестцы) | 5 settlements |
| Lyubytinsky (Любытинский) | district | | 49 216 | 49 616 | Lyubytino (Любытино); Nebolchi (Неболчи) | 2 settlements |
| Malovishersky (Маловишерский) | district | | 49 220 | 49 620 | Malaya Vishera (Малая Вишера) town*; Bolshaya Vishera (Большая Вишера) | 3 settlements |
| Maryovsky (Марёвский) | district | okrug | 49 223 | 49 623 | | 4 selsovets |
| Moshenskoy (Мошенской) | district | | 49 224 | 49 624 | | 5 settlements |
| Novgorodsky (Новгородский) | district | | 49 225 | 49 625 | Pankovka (Панковка); Proletariy (Пролетарий); Tyosovo-Netylsky (Тёсово-Нетыльский); Tyosovsky (Тёсовский) | 9 settlements |
| Okulovsky (Окуловский) | district | | 49 228 | 49 628 | Okulovka (Окуловка) town*; Kulotino (Кулотино); Uglovka (Угловка) | 7 settlements |
| Parfinsky (Парфинский) | district | | 49 230 | 49 630 | Parfino (Парфино) | 3 settlements |
| Pestovsky (Пестовский) | district | | 49 232 | 49 632 | Pestovo (Пестово) town* | 7 settlements |
| Poddorsky (Поддорский) | district | | 49 234 | 49 634 | | 3 settlements |
| Soletsky (Солецкий) | district | okrug | 49 238 | 49 638 | Soltsy (Сольцы) town* | 4 settlements |
| Starorussky (Старорусский) | district | | 49 239 | 49 639 | | 8 settlements |
| Khvoyninsky (Хвойнинский) | district | okrug | 49 245 | 49 645 | Khvoynaya (Хвойная) | 10 settlements |
| Kholmsky (Холмский) | district | | 49 247 | 49 647 | Kholm (Холм) town* | 3 settlements |
| Chudovsky (Чудовский) | district | | 49 250 | 49 650 | Chudovo (Чудово) town* | 3 settlements |
| Shimsky (Шимский) | district | | 49 255 | 49 655 | Shimsk (Шимск) | 4 settlements |

== Differences with municipal divisions ==
All of the administrative districts of Novgorod Oblast are municipally incorporated as municipal districts, and the Novgorod city of oblast significance is municipally incorporated as an urban okrug. There are, however, two exceptions,

- The town of Borovichi is municipally incorporated as Borovichskoye Urban Settlement of Borovichsky Municipal District.;
- The town of Staraya Russa is municipally incorporated as Starorusskoye Urban Settlement of Starorussky Municipal District.

== History ==
December 29 [O.S. December 18], 1708 Tsar Peter the Great issued an edict which established seven governorates. The description of the borders of the governorates was not given; instead, their area was defined as a set of towns and the lands adjacent to those towns. The present area of Novgorod oblast was a part of Ingermanland Governorate, which was renamed Saint Petersburg Governorate in 1710. The governorates were subdivided into uyezds, and uyezds into volosts. In 1727, a separate Novgorod Governorate was established. It was subdivided into five provinces, and the current area of Novgorod Oblast was split between two of them - Novgorod and Velikiye Luki Provinces. In 1772, Velikiye Luki Province was transferred to newly established Pskov Governorate. In 1775, Novgorod Governorate was transformed to Novgorod Viceroyalty, and in 1777, Pskov Governorate was transformed to Pskov Viceroyalty. In 1796, both governorates were re-established. By the 1920s, most of the area of current Novgorod Oblast belonged to Novgorod Governorate. Kholmsky and Soletsky Districts belonged to Pskov Governorate, and a part of Batetsky District belonged to Petrograd Governorate.

On August 1, 1927 the governorates were abolished, and merged into newly established Leningrad Oblast, which included the northwestern part of Russian Federation. The oblast were subdivided into 140 districts, which were grouped into nine okrugs. The current area of Novgorod Oblast was spread into six of these nine okrugs, Borovichi, Cherepovets, Leningrad, Luga, Novgorod, and Velikiye Luki Okrugs. On June 3, 1929 Velikiye Luki Okrug, which included Kholmsky District, was transferred from Leningrad Oblast to Western Oblast. Later on, it was transferred into Kalinin Oblast. In 1930, the okrugs were abolished, and the districts were directly subordinate to the oblast authorities.

Between autumn of 1941 and spring of 1944, during the World War II, western parts of the current area of Novgorod Oblast, including the city of Novgorod, were occupied by German troops. After the liberation, the administrative division of Soviet Union was considerably changed, and on July 5, 1944 Novgorod Oblast with the center in the city of Novgorod was established.

On August 22, 1944 Kholmsky District, which was a part of Novgorod Oblast, was transferred to newly established Velikiye Luki Oblast. On October 2, 1957 Velikiye Luki Oblast was abolished, and Kholmsky District was transferred to Pskov Oblast. On July 29, 1958 it was transferred back to Novgorod Oblast.

In the middle of the 1960s the oblast went through the abortive Khrushchyov administrative reform, when districts were first divided into large-scale agricultural and industrial districts, and several years later these were abolished, and the oblast got a district structure different from that before the reform.

=== Abolished districts ===
After 1927 (with the exception of the aborted reform of 1963-1965) borders between the districts sometimes were modified, and as a result some of the districts were abolished. This list includes the districts which existed in the current area of Novgorod Oblast.

- Belebyolkovsky District (the administrative center in the selo of Belebyolka), Leningrad Oblast, established in 1927, abolished in 1931, re-established in 1941, abolished in 1961, merged into Poddorsky District;
- Bronnitsky District (the selo of Bronnitsa), established in 1927, renamed into Mstinsky District in 1931 (the selo of Bronnitsa, which was the administrative center of the district, was renamed Msta), abolished in 1932. Re-established in 1941, with the district center in the urban-type settlement of Proletariy. Abolished in 1963, after a number of administrative transformations split between Novgorodsky and Krestetsky Districts;
- Chyornovsky District (the selo of Chyornoye), Leningrad Oblast, established in 1927, abolished in 1931, merged into Batetsky District;
- Dregelsky District (the village of Dregli), established in 1927 as Zhukovsky District, renamed into Dregelsky District in 1931 (the village of Zhukovo, which was the administrative center of the district, was renamed Dregli); abolished in 1962, after a number of administrative transformations merged into Lyubytinsky Districts;
- Konchansky District (the selo of Konchanskoye), Leningrad Oblast, established in 1927, abolished in 1932, split between Borovichsky, Khvoyninsky, and Moshenskoy Districts;
- Lychkovsky District (the selo of Lychkovo), established in 1927 as Luzhensky District, renamed into Lychkovsky District in 1928, abolished in 1963, after a number of administrative transformations split between Demyansky and Valdaysky Districts;
- Medvedsky District (the selo of Medved), Leningrad Oblast, established in 1927, abolished in 1931, merged into Novgorodsky District;
- Mstinsky District (the selo of Bronnitsa), established in 1927 as Bronnitsky District, renamed into Mstinsky District in 1931 (the selo of Bronnitsa, which was the administrative center of the district, was renamed Msta), abolished in 1932. Re-established in 1941, with the district center in the urban-type settlement of Proletariy. Abolished in 1963, after a number of administrative transformations split between Novgorodsky and Krestetsky Districts;
- Opechensky District (the selo of Opechensky Posad), established in 1927, abolished in 1931, re-established in 1939, abolished in 1960, split between Borovichsky and Moshenskoy Districts;
- Orekhovsky District (the selo of Klimkovo), Leningrad Oblast, established in 1927, abolished in 1931, merged into Moshenskoy District;
- Podgoshchsky District (the selo of Podgoshchi), Leningrad Oblast, established in 1927, abolished in 1931, merged into Starorussky District;
- Polskoy District (the railway station of Pola), established in 1927, abolished in 1932, re-established in 1939 as Polavsky District, abolished in 1962, after a number of administrative transformations split between Demyansky and Parfinsky Districts;
- Polnovsky District (the selo of Polnovo), Leningrad Oblast, established in 1927, renamed Polnovo-Seligersky District in 1930, abolished in 1932, merged into Demyansky District;
- Torbinsky District (the selo of Torbino), Leningrad Oblast, established in 1927, abolished in 1931, split between Bologovsky, Borovichsky, and Okulovsky Districts;
- Uglovsky District (the railway station of Uglovka), Leningrad Oblast, established in 1927, abolished in 1931, merged into Okulovsky District;
- Utorgoshsky District (the settlement of Utorgosh), established in 1927, abolished in 1931, re-established in 1935, abolished in 1962, after a number of administrative transformations split between Soletsky and Shimsky Districts;
- Zaluchsky District (the selo of Zaluchye), established in 1927, abolished in 1961, split between Molvotitsky (currently Maryovsky) and Starorussky Districts.

In the end of the 1920s minor areas which are now parts of Novgorod Oblast were parts of short-lived Budogoshchensky (with the center in Budogoshch) and Pikalyovsky Districts (Pikalyovo). Much of the area of these districts belongs now to Leningrad Oblast. Rozhdestvensky District (with the administrative center in the selo of Rozhdestvo), Leningrad Oblast, was established in 1927, abolished in 1931, and merged into Bologovsky District. Much of its area is currently in Tver Oblast. Troitsky District (with the administrative center in the selo of Troitsa-Khlavitsa), established in 1927, was renamed Lovatsky District in 1930, and abolished in the same year, being split between Kholmsky and Loknyansky Districts. The area of Lovatsky District is currently split between Pskov and Novgorod Oblasts. Podberezinsky District (with the administrative center in the selo of Podberezye) was established in 1945 as a part of Velikiye Luki Oblast, moved in 1957 to Pskov Oblast, and abolished in 1958, being split between Kholmsky, Loknyansky, Velikoluksky, and Ploshoshsky Districts. The area of Podberezinsky Districts is split between Pskov, Tver, and Novgorod Oblasts.

=== Renamed districts ===
Several of the districts were renamed: Belsky into Lyubytinsky, Minetsky into Khvoyninsky, and Molvotitsky into Maryovsky (it was first abolished and then re-established under a different name).
