= Mikheyevo =

Mikheyevo (Russian: Михеево) is the name of several rural localities in Russia.

== Arkhangelsk Oblast ==
As of 2022, one rural locality in Arkhangelsk Oblast bears this name:

- Mikheyevo, Arkhangelsk Oblast, a village in Trufanogorsky Selsoviet of Pinezhsky District

== Ivanovo Oblast ==
As of 2022, two rural localities in Ivanovo Oblast bear this name:

- Mikheyevo, Komsomolsky District, Ivanovo Oblast, a village in Komsomolsky District
- Mikheyevo, Yuzhsky District, Ivanovo Oblast, a village in Yuzhsky District

== Kaluga Oblast ==
As of 2022, two rural localities in Kaluga Oblast bear this name:

- Mikheyevo, Maloyaroslavetsky District, Kaluga Oblast, a village in Maloyaroslavetsky District
- Mikheyevo, Medynsky District, Kaluga Oblast, a village in Medynsky District

== Kirov Oblast ==
As of 2022, one rural locality in Kirov Oblast bears this name:

- Mikheyevo, Kirov Oblast, a village in Fateyevsky Rural Okrug of Kirovo-Chepetsky District

== Kostroma Oblast ==
As of 2022, four rural localities in Kostroma Oblast bear this name:

- Mikheyevo, Antropovsky District, Kostroma Oblast, a village in Kurnovskoye Settlement of Antropovsky District
- Mikheyevo, Buysky District, Kostroma Oblast, a village in Tsentralnoye Settlement of Buysky District
- Mikheyevo, Kadyysky District, Kostroma Oblast, a village in Selishchenskoye Settlement of Kadyysky District
- Mikheyevo, Nerekhtsky District, Kostroma Oblast, a village in Prigorodnoye Settlement of Nerekhtsky District

== Moscow Oblast ==
As of 2022, four rural localities in Moscow Oblast bear this name:

- Mikheyevo, Domodedovo, Moscow Oblast, a village under the administrative jurisdiction of the Domodedovo City Under Oblast Jurisdiction
- Mikheyevo, Akatyevskoye Rural Settlement, Kolomensky District, Moscow Oblast, a village in Akatyevskoye Rural Settlement of Kolomensky District
- Mikheyevo, Zarudenskoye Rural Settlement, Kolomensky District, Moscow Oblast, a village in Zarudenskoye Rural Settlement of Kolomensky District
- Mikheyevo, Ramensky District, Moscow Oblast, a selo in Rybolovskoye Rural Settlement of Ramensky District

== Novgorod Oblast ==
As of 2022, four rural localities in Novgorod Oblast bear this name:

- Mikheyevo, Demyansky District, Novgorod Oblast, a village in Ilyinogorskoye Settlement of Demyansky District
- Mikheyevo, Lyubytinsky District, Novgorod Oblast, a village under the administrative jurisdiction of the urban-type settlement of Nebolchi, Lyubytinsky District
- Mikheyevo, Kalininskoye Settlement, Moshenskoy District, Novgorod Oblast, a village in Kalininskoye Settlement of Moshenskoy District
- Mikheyevo, Kirovskoye Settlement, Moshenskoy District, Novgorod Oblast, a village in Kirovskoye Settlement of Moshenskoy District

== Pskov Oblast ==
As of 2022, four rural localities in Pskov Oblast bear this name:

- Mikheyevo (Zhadritskaya Rural Settlement), Novorzhevsky District, Pskov Oblast, a village in Novorzhevsky District; municipally, a part of Zhadritskaya Rural Settlement of that district
- Mikheyevo (Veskinskaya Rural Settlement), Novorzhevsky District, Pskov Oblast, a village in Novorzhevsky District; municipally, a part of Veskinskaya Rural Settlement of that district
- Mikheyevo, Pustoshkinsky District, Pskov Oblast, a village in Pustoshkinsky District
- Mikheyevo, Sebezhsky District, Pskov Oblast, a village in Sebezhsky District

== Smolensk Oblast ==
As of 2022, two rural localities in Smolensk Oblast bear this name:

- Mikheyevo, Dukhovshchinsky District, Smolensk Oblast, a village in Prechistenskoye Rural Settlement of Dukhovshchinsky District
- Mikheyevo, Kholm-Zhirkovsky District, Smolensk Oblast, a village in Pigulinskoye Rural Settlement of Kholm-Zhirkovsky District

== Tver Oblast ==
As of 2022, seven rural localities in Tver Oblast bear this name:

- Mikheyevo, Kalininsky District, Tver Oblast, a village in Kalininsky District
- Mikheyevo, Kimrsky District, Tver Oblast, a village in Kimrsky District
- Mikheyevo, Krasnokholmsky District, Tver Oblast, a village in Krasnokholmsky District
- Mikheyevo, Likhoslavlsky District, Tver Oblast, a village in Likhoslavlsky District
- Mikheyevo, Molokovsky District, Tver Oblast, a village in Molokovsky District
- Mikheyevo, Sandovsky District, Tver Oblast, a village in Sandovsky District
- Mikheyevo, Zapadnodvinsky District, Tver Oblast, a village in Zapadnodvinsky District

== Vladimir Oblast ==
As of 2022, one rural locality in Vladimir Oblast bears this name:

- Mikheyevo, Vladimir Oblast, a village in Sobinsky District

== Vologda Oblast ==
As of 2022, three rural localities in Vologda Oblast bear this name:

- Mikheyevo, Cherepovetsky District, Vologda Oblast, a village in Bolshedvorsky Selsoviet of Cherepovetsky District
- Mikheyevo, Kichmengsko-Gorodetsky District, Vologda Oblast, a village in Kurilovsky Selsoviet of Kichmengsko-Gorodetsky District
- Mikheyevo, Sokolsky District, Vologda Oblast, a village in Biryakovsky Selsoviet of Sokolsky District

== Yaroslavl Oblast ==
As of 2022, eight rural localities in Yaroslavl Oblast bear this name:

- Mikheyevo, Bolsheselsky District, Yaroslavl Oblast, a village in Chudinovsky Rural Okrug of Bolsheselsky District
- Mikheyevo, Lyubimsky District, Yaroslavl Oblast, a village in Osetsky Rural Okrug of Lyubimsky District
- Mikheyevo, Pereslavsky District, Yaroslavl Oblast, a village in Zagoryevsky Rural Okrug of Pereslavsky District
- Mikheyevo, Poshekhonsky District, Yaroslavl Oblast, a village in Kolodinsky Rural Okrug of Poshekhonsky District
- Mikheyevo, Rybinsky District, Yaroslavl Oblast, a village in Mikhaylovsky Rural Okrug of Rybinsky District
- Mikheyevo, Tutayevsky District, Yaroslavl Oblast, a village in Pomogalovsky Rural Okrug of Tutayevsky District
- Mikheyevo, Uglichsky District, Yaroslavl Oblast, a village in Pokrovsky Rural Okrug of Uglichsky District
- Mikheyevo, Yaroslavsky District, Yaroslavl Oblast, a village in Mordvinovsky Rural Okrug of Yaroslavsky District
