= Podberezye =

Podberezye (Russian: Подберезье) is the name of several rural localities in Russia.

== Kaluga Oblast ==
As of 2010, two rural localities in Kaluga Oblast bear this name:

- Podberezye, Babyninsky District, Kaluga Oblast, a village in Babyninsky District
- Podberezye, Mosalsky District, Kaluga Oblast, a village in Mosalsky District

== Leningrad Oblast ==
As of 2010, one rural locality in Leningrad Oblast bears this name:

- Podberezye, Leningrad Oblast, a logging depot settlement in Seleznevskoye Settlement Municipal Formation of Vyborgsky District

== Novgorod Oblast ==
As of 2010, eight rural localities in Novgorod Oblast bear this name:

- Podberezye (railway station), Podberezskoye Settlement, Novgorodsky District, Novgorod Oblast, a railway station in Podberezskoye Settlement of Novgorodsky District
- Podberezye (village), Podberezskoye Settlement, Novgorodsky District, Novgorod Oblast, a village in Podberezskoye Settlement of Novgorodsky District
- Podberezye, Batetsky District, Novgorod Oblast, a village in Peredolskoye Settlement of Batetsky District
- Podberezye, Kholmsky District, Novgorod Oblast, a village in Morkhovskoye Settlement of Kholmsky District
- Podberezye, Lyubytinsky District, Novgorod Oblast, a village under the administrative jurisdiction of the urban-type settlement of Nebolchi in Lyubytinsky District
- Podberezye, Moshenskoy District, Novgorod Oblast, a village in Kirovskoye Settlement of Moshenskoy District
- Podberezye, Okulovsky District, Novgorod Oblast, a village under the administrative jurisdiction of the urban-type settlement of Kulotino in Okulovsky District
- Podberezye, Soletsky District, Novgorod Oblast, a village in Vybitskoye Settlement of Soletsky District

== Pskov Oblast ==
As of 2010, four rural localities in Pskov Oblast bear this name:

- Podberezye, Loknyansky District, Pskov Oblast, a selo in Loknyansky District
- Podberezye, Ostrovsky District, Pskov Oblast, a village in Ostrovsky District
- Podberezye, Pskovsky District, Pskov Oblast, a village in Pskovsky District
- Podberezye, Velikoluksky District, Pskov Oblast, a village in Velikoluksky District

== Smolensk Oblast ==
As of 2010, two rural localities in Smolensk Oblast bear this name:

- Podberezye, Krasninsky District, Smolensk Oblast, a village in Neykovskoye Rural Settlement of Krasninsky District
- Podberezye, Sychyovsky District, Smolensk Oblast, a village in Subbotnikovskoye Rural Settlement of Sychyovsky District

== Tver Oblast ==
As of 2010, seven rural localities in Tver Oblast bear this name:

- Podberezye, Andreapolsky District, Tver Oblast, a village in Toropatskoye Rural Settlement of Andreapolsky District
- Podberezye, Nelidovsky District, Tver Oblast, a village in Zemtsovskoye Rural Settlement of Nelidovsky District
- Podberezye, Pestrikovskoye Rural Settlement, Kashinsky District, Tver Oblast, a village in Pestrikovskoye Rural Settlement of Kashinsky District
- Podberezye, Sandovsky District, Tver Oblast, a village in Sobolinskoye Rural Settlement of Sandovsky District
- Podberezye, Selizharovsky District, Tver Oblast, a village in Dmitrovskoye Rural Settlement of Selizharovsky District
- Podberezye, Slavkovskoye Rural Settlement, Kashinsky District, Tver Oblast, a village in Slavkovskoye Rural Settlement of Kashinsky District
- Podberezye, Vyshnevolotsky District, Tver Oblast, a village in Luzhnikovskoye Rural Settlement of Vyshnevolotsky District

== Vladimir Oblast ==
As of 2010, one rural locality in Vladimir Oblast bears this name:

- Podberezye, Vladimir Oblast, a selo in Suzdalsky District

== Vologda Oblast ==
As of 2010, two rural localities in Vologda Oblast bear this name:

- Podberezye, Velikoustyugsky District, Vologda Oblast, a village in Shemogodsky Selsoviet of Velikoustyugsky District
- Podberezye, Vologodsky District, Vologda Oblast, a village in Bereznikovsky Selsoviet of Vologodsky District

== Yaroslavl Oblast ==
As of 2010, three rural localities in Yaroslavl Oblast bear this name:

- Podberezye, Pereslavsky District, Yaroslavl Oblast, a village in Perelessky Rural Okrug of Pereslavsky District
- Podberezye, Rostovsky District, Yaroslavl Oblast, a village in Shugorsky Rural Okrug of Rostovsky District
- Podberezye, Uglichsky District, Yaroslavl Oblast, a village in Uleyminsky Rural Okrug of Uglichsky District
