= Olekhovo =

Olekhovo (Russian: Олехово) is the name of several rural localities in Russia.

== Modern localities ==
- Olekhovo, Kaliningrad Oblast, a settlement in Novostroyevsky Rural Okrug of Ozyorsky District of Kaliningrad Oblast
- Olekhovo, Kalininskoye Settlement, Moshenskoy District, Novgorod Oblast, a village in Kalininskoye Settlement of Moshenskoy District of Novgorod Oblast
- Olekhovo, Mezhdurechensky District, Vologda Oblast, a village in Staroselsky Selsoviet of Mezhdurechensky District of Vologda Oblast
- Olekhovo, Vologodsky District, Vologda Oblast, a village in Kubensky Selsoviet of Vologodsky District of Vologda Oblast
- Olekhovo, Rybinsky District, Yaroslavl Oblast, a village in Arefinsky Rural Okrug of Rybinsky District of Yaroslavl Oblast
- Olekhovo, Tutayevsky District, Yaroslavl Oblast, a village in Rodionovsky Rural Okrug of Tutayevsky District of Yaroslavl Oblast

== Abolished localities ==
- Olekhovo, Orekhovskoye Settlement, Moshenskoy District, Novgorod Oblast, a village in Orekhovskoye Settlement of Moshenskoy District of Novgorod Oblast; abolished in September 2012
