= Moshenskoy =

Moshenskoy (masculine), Moshenskaya (feminine), or Moshenskoye (neuter) may refer to:

- Moshenskoy District, a district of Novgorod Oblast, Russia
- Moshenskoy (rural locality) (Moshenskaya, Moshenskoye), name of several rural localities in Russia
