= Moshenskoy (rural locality) =

Moshenskoy (Russian: Мошенской; masculine), Moshenskaya (Мошенская; feminine), or Moshenskoye (Мошенское; neuter) is the name of several rural localities in Russia:

- Moshenskoye, Kaliningrad Oblast, a settlement in Novostroyevsky Rural Okrug of Ozyorsky District of Kaliningrad Oblast
- Moshenskoye, Novgorod Oblast, a selo in Moshenskoye Settlement of Moshenskoy District of Novgorod Oblast
