= Uglovka =

Uglovka (Russian: Угловка) is the name of several inhabited localities in Russia.

Urban localities

- Uglovka, Novgorod Oblast, a work settlement in Okulovsky District of Novgorod Oblast

Rural localities

- Uglovka, Yaroslavl Oblast, a village in Slobodskoy Rural Okrug of Uglichsky District of Yaroslavl Oblast
