= Uver =

- Native name: Уверь (Russian)

Location
- Country: Russia

Physical characteristics
- Source: Lake Korobozha
  - elevation: 144 m (472 ft)
- Mouth: Msta
  - coordinates: 58°12′10″N 34°28′40″E
- Length: 90 km (56 mi)
- Basin size: 3,990 km^{2} (1,540 sq mi)

Basin features
- Progression: Msta→ Lake Ilmen→ Volkhov→ Lake Ladoga→ Neva→ Gulf of Finland

The Uver (Russian: Уверь) is a river in Moshenskoy and Borovichsky Districts of Novgorod Oblast. It is a right tributary of the Msta. It is 90 kilometres (56 mi) long, and the area of its basin 3,930 square kilometres (1,520 sq mi). The principal tributary is the Syezha (left).

The source of the Uver is in Lake Korobozha, northeast of the town of Borovichi. It flows south and joins the Msta between the settlements of Berezovsky Ryadok and Opechensky Posad. The selo of Moshenskoye is located on the banks of the Uver.

The drainage basin of the Uver comprises the western part of Moshenskoy District, the northern part of Udomelsky District of Tver Oblast, as well as areas in the south of Khvoyninsky District and in the southeast of Borovichsky District, both of Novgorod Oblast.

Before the 18th century, one of the waterways between Novgorod and the river basin of the Volga ran along the Msta and the Uver. The foundation of Moshenskoye in the 16th century was presumably related to the existence of this waterway.
