= Borovichi (bandy) =

- City: Borovichi, Russia
- Founded: 1928; 97 years ago
- Home arena: Volga Stadium

Borovichi (Russian: Боровичи) is a professional bandy club in Borovichi, Russia. It is the only professional sports team in Novgorod Oblast. The club colours are red, white and blue.

The club was founded in 1928. In 2010, it was playing in the High Division (the first tier) of the Russian Bandy Super League, but in 2011 due to financial difficulties it was relegated to the First Division (the second tier). Their home arena has a capacity of 5,000.
