= Kulotino =

Kulotino (Russian: Кулотино) is the name of several inhabited localities in Russia.

== Urban localities ==
- Kulotino, Novgorod Oblast, a work settlement in Okulovsky District of Novgorod Oblast

== Rural localities ==
- Kulotino, Pskov Oblast, a village in Plyussky District of Pskov Oblast
- Kulotino, Staritsky District, Tver Oblast, a village in Staritsky District, Tver Oblast
- Kulotino, Vyshnevolotsky District, Tver Oblast, a village in Vyshnevolotsky District, Tver Oblast
- Kulotino, Zubtsovsky District, Tver Oblast, a village in Zubtsovsky District, Tver Oblast
- Kulotino, Yaroslavl Oblast, a village in Vereteysky Rural Okrug of Nekouzsky District of Yaroslavl Oblast
