= Borovichsky District =

Borovichsky District Боровичский район (Russian)
- District
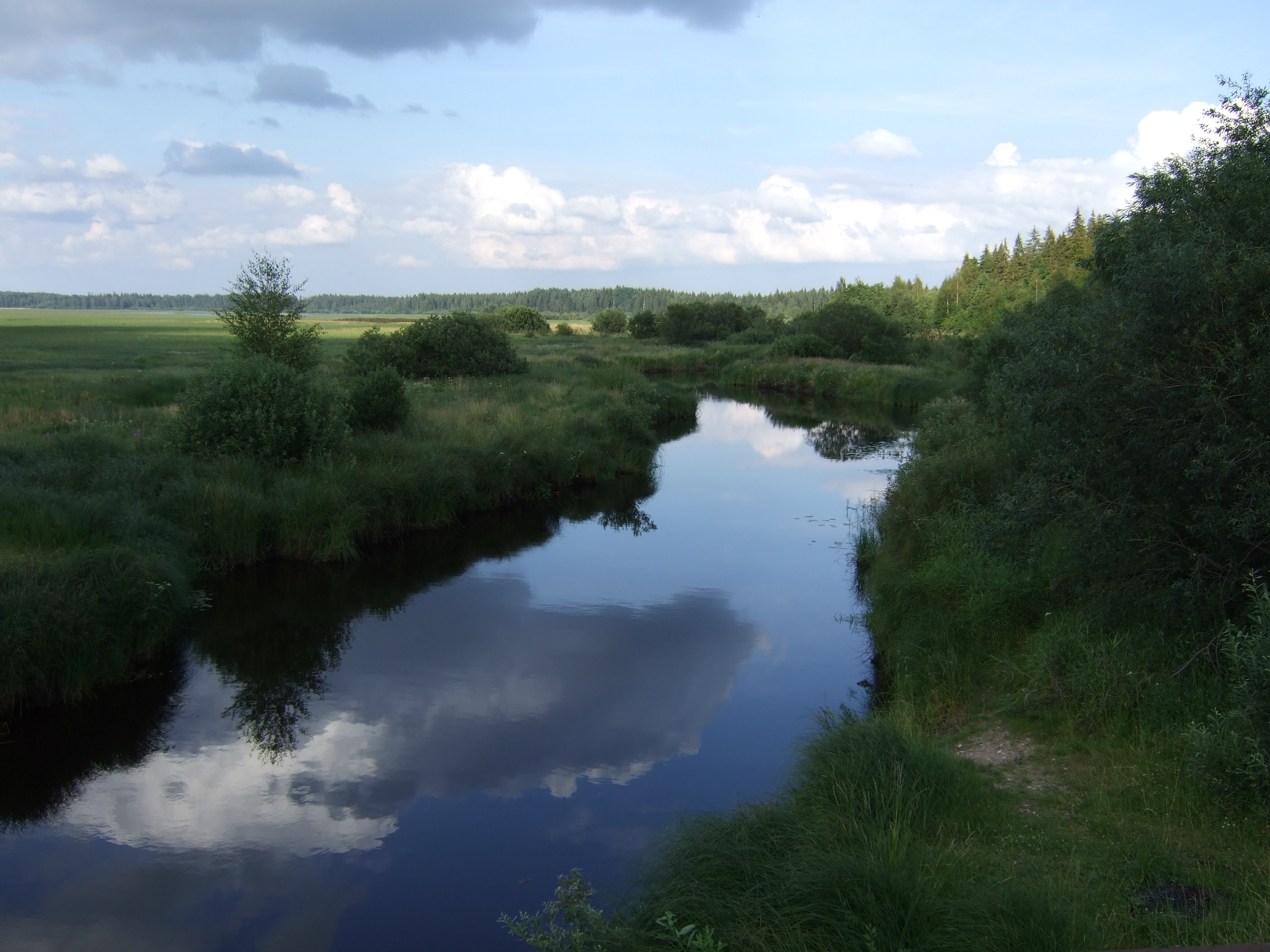
- River landscape in Borovichsky District

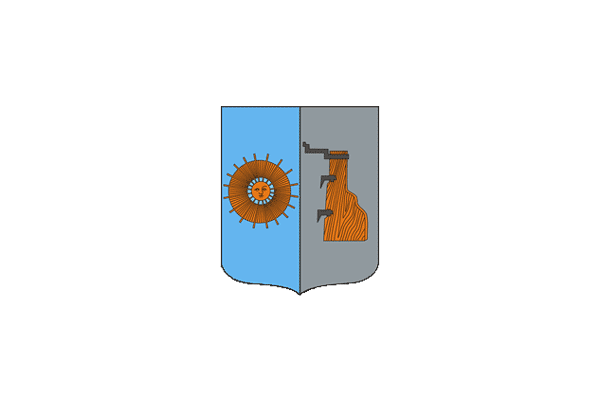
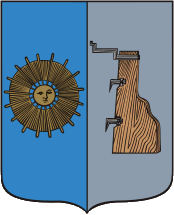
- Flag Coat of arms
- Location of Borovichsky District in Novgorod Oblast
- Coordinates: 58°16′N 34°07′E
- Country: Russia
- Federal subject: Novgorod Oblast
- Established: October 1, 1927
- Administrative center: Borovichi

Area
  - Total: 3,100 km^{2} (1,200 sq mi)

Population (2010 Census)
  - Total: 15,675
  - Density: 5.1/km^{2} (13/sq mi)
  - Urban: 0%
  - Rural: 100%

Administrative structure
  - Administrative divisions: 10 Settlements
  - Inhabited localities: 323 rural localities

Municipal structure
  - Municipally incorporated as: Borovichsky Municipal District
  - Municipal divisions: 1 urban settlements, 16 rural settlements
- Time zone: UTC+3 (MSK)
- OKTMO ID: 49606000
- Website: http://www.boradmin.ru/

Borovichsky District (Russian: Боровичский райо́н) is an administrative and municipal district (raion), one of the twenty-one in Novgorod Oblast, Russia. It is located in the east of the oblast and borders with Khvoyninsky District in the north, Moshenskoy District in the east, Udomelsky District of Tver Oblast in the southeast, Bologovsky District of Tver Oblast in the south, Okulovsky District in the west, and with Lyubytinsky District in the northwest. The area of the district is 3,100 square kilometers (1,200 sq mi). Its administrative center is the town of Borovichi (which is not administratively a part of the district). Population: 15,675 (2010 census); 19,085 (2002 Census); 21,648 (1989 Soviet census).

== Geography ==
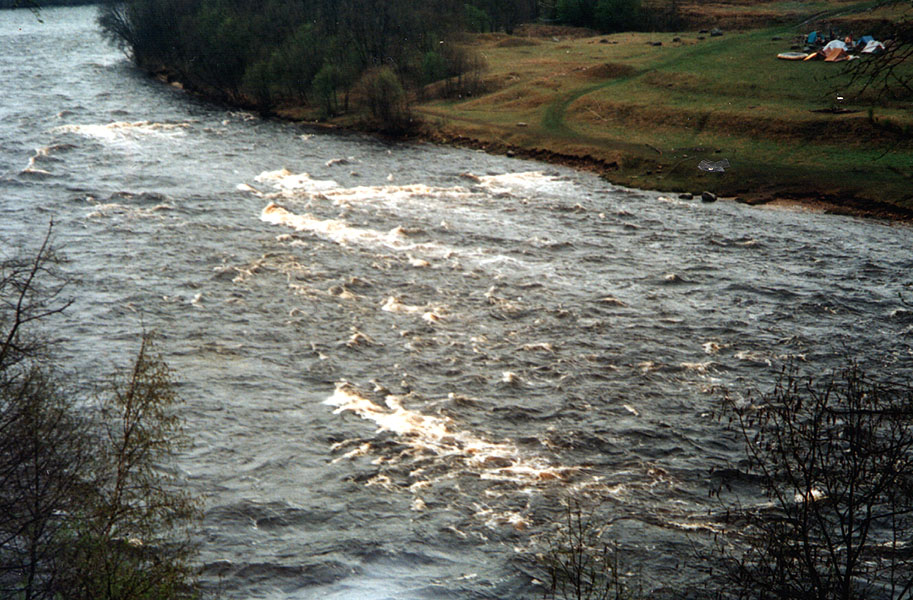
Rapids on the Msta River

Borovichsky District is located in the northeastern part of the Valday Hills in the basin of the Msta River. The Msta crosses the district from southeast to northwest. Msta's rapids are located in the district. The principal tributaries of the Msta within the limits of the district are the Uver and the Velgiya; both are right. The northeast of the district lies in the basin of the tributaries of the Uver, of which the Udina is the biggest one.

There are many lakes in the district. One major lake, Lake Piros, is located in the south of the district and is shared with Tver Oblast. There are clusters of lakes in the east and in the northeast. The biggest lakes in those areas are Lake Limandrovo, the source of the Velgiya, and Lake Sheregodra.

Much of the district's territory is covered by forests.

== History ==
The Msta River was an important waterway since at least the 10th century, since it connected Novgorod with the basins of the Volga and Northern Dvina Rivers. In 947 in particular, Olga of Kiev founded a number of pogosts on the river. In the course of the administrative reform carried out in 1708 by Peter the Great, the territory was included into Ingermanland Governorate (known since 1710 as Saint Petersburg Governorate). In 1727, separate Novgorod Governorate was split off. In 1770, Borovichi was chartered, and in 1773, Borovichsky Uyezd was established. In 1776, the area was transferred to Novgorod Viceroyalty. In 1796, the viceroyalty was abolished and Borovichsky Uyezd was transferred to Novgorod Governorate.

In August 1927, the governorates and uyezds were abolished. Borovichsky District, with the administrative center in the town of Borovichi, was established within Borovichi Okrug of Leningrad Oblast effective October 1, 1927. It included parts of Borovichskaya, Vasilyevskaya, Volokskaya, and Opechenskaya Volosts of former Borovichsky Uyezd. On July 23, 1930, the okrugs were abolished, and the districts were directly subordinated to the oblast. The town of Borovichi was initially subordinated to the district, but from 1930 it became a town under oblast jurisdiction. On July 5, 1944, Borovichsky District was transferred to newly established Novgorod Oblast, where it remained ever since.

Effective October 1, 1927, Opechensky District with the administrative center in the selo of Opechensky Posad was also established as a part of Borovichi Okrug of Leningrad Oblast. On September 20, 1931, Opechensky District was abolished and merged into Borovichsky District, but on August 3, 1939 it was restored. On July 5, 1944, the district was transferred to Novgorod Oblast. On November 17, 1960, Opechensky District was abolished, and its area was split between Borovichsky and Moshenskoy Districts.

Also effective October 1, 1927, Konchansky District with the administrative center in the selo of Konchanskoye was established as a part of Borovichi Okrug of Leningrad Oblast. On January 1, 1932, Konchansky District was abolished and split between Borovichsky, Moshenskoy, and Khvoyninsky Districts.

Another district established effective October 1, 1927 as a part of Borovichi Okrug of Leningrad Oblast was Uglovsky District. Its administrative center was in the railway station of Uglovka. On January 1, 1932, Uglovsky District was abolished and split between Bologovsky, Borovichsky, and Okulovsky Districts.

== Administrative and municipal status ==
Within the framework of administrative divisions, Borovichsky District is one of the twenty-one in the oblast. The town of Borovichi serves as its administrative center, despite being incorporated separately as a town of oblast significance—an administrative unit with the status equal to that of the districts.

As a municipal division, the district is incorporated as Borovichsky Municipal District, with the town of oblast significance of Borovichi being incorporated within it as Borovichi Urban Settlement.

== Economy ==
=== Agriculture ===
As of 2010, there were 22 large-scale farms and 170 smaller farms. Of all agricultural production, 62% was in meat, milk, and eggs production.

=== Transportation ===
Borovichi is connected by a railroad with Uglovka and thus with the railway between Moscow and St. Petersburg.

The district is well connected by all-seasonal roads. In particular, roads connecting Borovichi with Tikhvin (via Lyubytino), Okulovka, and Pestovo all cross the district, and there are many local roads with bus traffic.

== Culture and recreation ==
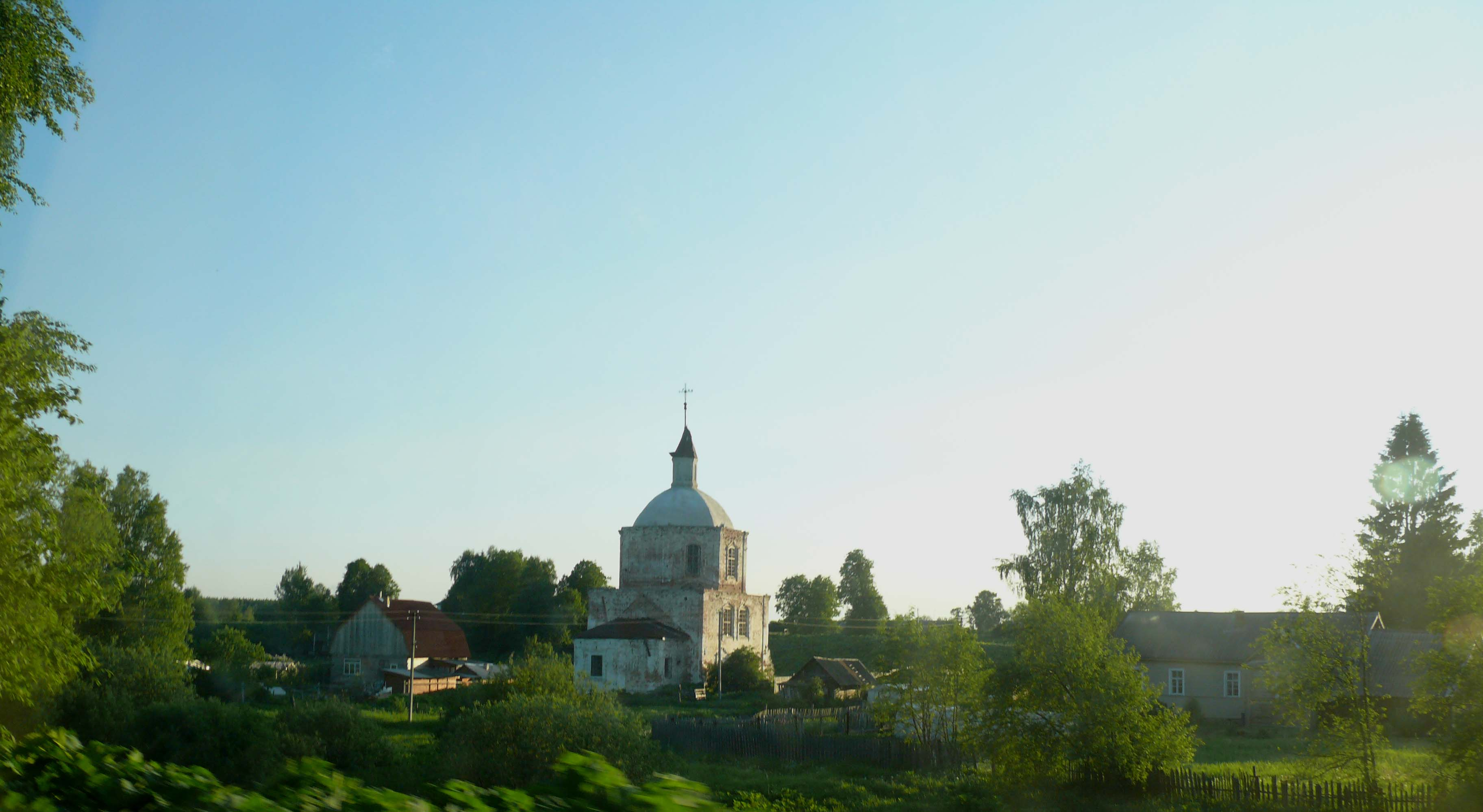
The Transfiguration Church (1764) in the village of Rovnoye, protected as a cultural heritage monument of federal significance

The district contains 14 cultural heritage monuments of federal significance and additionally 201 objects classified as cultural and historical heritage of local significance. Most of the federal monuments are archaeological sites.

There is one museum in the district, the Suvorov estate in the selo of Konchansko-Suvorovskoye. Generalissimo Alexander Suvorov, a Russian military commander notable for military operations against the Ottoman Empire and against the army of Napoleon in the late 18th century, owned the estate and visited it on many occasions. In particular, he spent in the estate several years during his retirement.

== Notable residents ==
- Grigory Romanov (1923 in Zikhnovo – 2008), Soviet politician
