= Moshenskoye, Novgorod Oblast =

Town in Novgorod Oblast, Russia

Moshenskoye Мошенское
- Selo
- Interactive map of Moshenskoye
- Location of Moshenskoye Moshenskoye (Novgorod Oblast)
- Coordinates: 58°31′N 34°34′E
- Country: Russia
- Federal subject: Novgorod Oblast
- Administrative district: Moshenskoy District
- Selsoviet: Moshenskoye Settlement
- First mentioned: 1545

Population (2010 Census)
  - Total: 2,505
  - Estimate (2020): 2,065 (−17.6%)

Administrative status
  - Capital of: Moshenskoy District, Moshenskoye Settlement

Municipal status
  - Municipal district: Moshenskoy Municipal District
  - Rural settlement: Moshenskoye Rural Settlement
  - Capital of: Moshenskoy Municipal District, Moshenskoye Rural Settlement
- Time zone: UTC+3 (MSK)
- Postal code: 238134
- OKTMO ID: 49624431101

Moshenskoye (Russian: Мошенское) is a rural locality (a selo) and the administrative center of Moshenskoy District of Novgorod Oblast, Russia, in the east of the oblast, on the Uver River. Municipally, it is the administrative center of Moshenskoye Rural Settlement. Population: 2,505 (2010 census); 2,760 (2002 census); 3,000 (1989 Soviet census).

== History ==
Moshenskoye was first mentioned in chronicles in 1545 as Nikolsky Pogost in Moshna. At the time, it belonged to the Bezhetskaya pyatina of the Grand Duchy of Moscow. One of the waterways between Novgorod and the basin of the Volga River run along the Msta and the Uver, and the foundation of Moshenskoye was presumably related to the existence of this waterway.

In the course of the administrative reform carried out in 1708 by Peter the Great, the area was included into Ingermanland Governorate (known since 1710 as Saint Petersburg Governorate). In 1727, separate Novgorod Governorate split off. In 1776, the area was transferred to Novgorod Viceroyalty. In 1796, the viceroyalty was abolished, and the Nikolo-Moshenskaya Volost of Borovichsky Uyezd, was transferred to Novgorod Governorate. On August 1, 1927, the uyezds were abolished, and Moshenskoy District was established, with the center in Moshenskoye. The district belonged to Borovichi Okrug of Leningrad Oblast. On July 23, 1930 the okrugs were abolished, and the districts became directly subordinate to the oblast. On July 5, 1944, Moshenskoy District was transferred to newly established Novgorod Oblast.

== Economy ==
=== Industry ===
In the district, there are small-scale enterprises of timber industry and food industry.

=== Transportation ===
Moshenskoye is connected to the paved road between Pestovo and Borovichi. There also other local roads, as well as local bus traffic. The closest railway station is in the town of Borovichi, 50 kilometers (31 mi) to the west of Moshenskoye.

The Uver was used as a part of Vyshnevolotsky Canal System constructed in the 18th century to bypass the rapids on the Msta. The system became outdated already in the 19th century and was eventually surpassed by Tikhvinskaya water system and by Mariinsk Canal System. It is not in use anymore.

== Culture and recreation ==
In Moshenskoye, there are eight objects classified as cultural and historical heritage of local significance. These are several former estates and a butter production facility.
