= Borovichi Museum =

Museum in Novgorod Oblast, Russia

Coordinates: 58°23′21″N 33°54′20″E

- Музей истории города Боровичи и Боровичского края
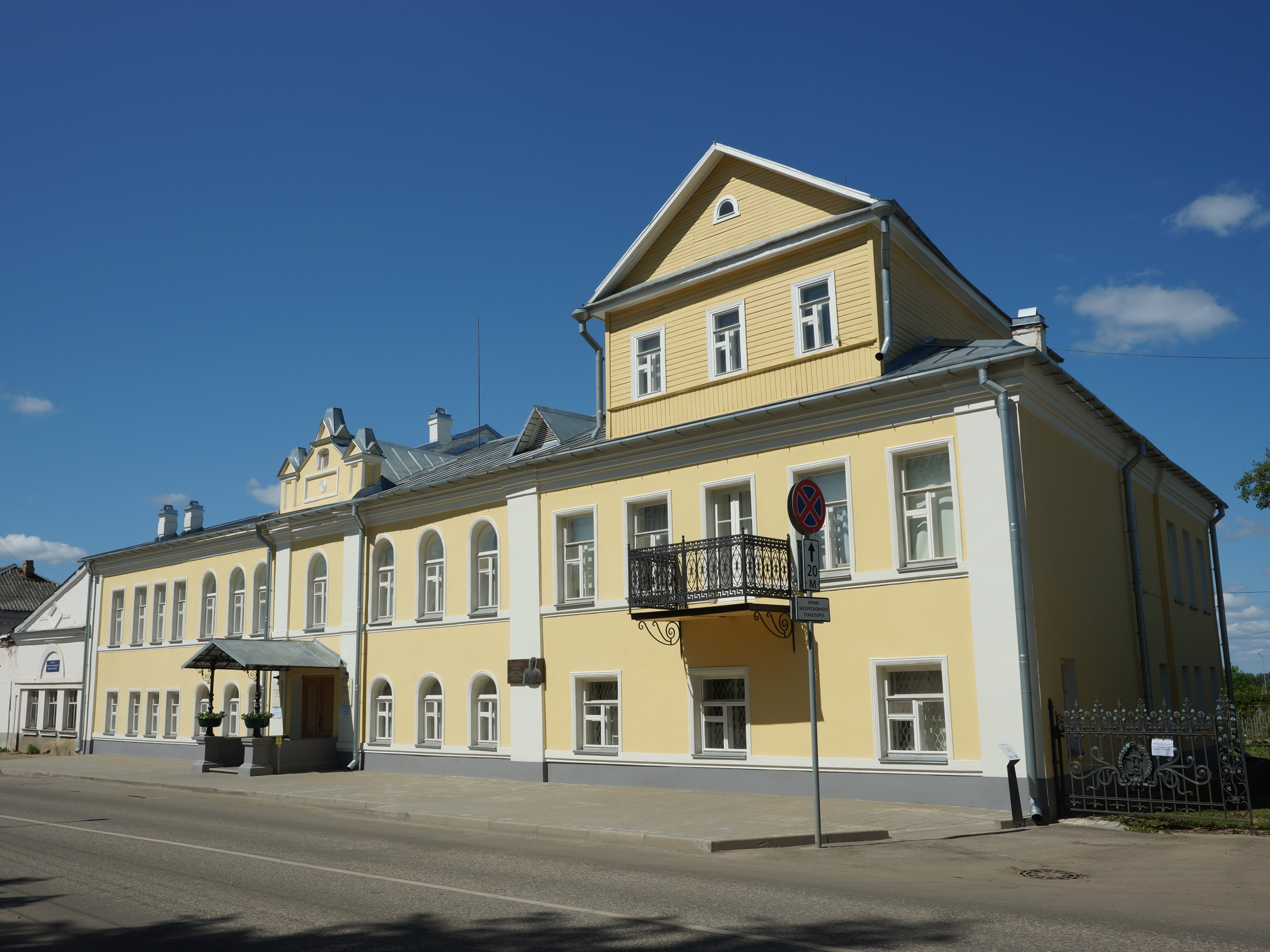
- Established: May, 1918
- Location: Russia, Novgorod Oblast, Borovichi

Borovichi Museum, or formally, The Museum of the history of the city of Borovichi and Borovichi krai (Russian: Музей истории города Боровичи и Боровичского края) is a local history museum in the city of Borovichi, in Novgorod Oblast, Russia. It is one of the oldest museums in the region.

The museum, initially dedicated to the lives and times of Vasily Zhukovsky and Nikolai Gogol, was founded in May 1918 by the board of the Borovichi District Department of Public Education. The museum was closed between 1926 and 1927, but reopened in 1928 due to the efforts of Sergei Nikolayevich Porshnyakov (1889-1992), who became the first director of the museum.

== History ==
The museum was established by the board of the Borovichi District Department of Public Education in May 1918. It initially consisted of a collection of artefacts relating to Vasily Zhukovsky and Nikolai Gogol, which had been organized and displayed at the Borovichi Realschule since 1910. The first exposition was opened on 16 July 1921. The museum was named the "Borovichi museum of proletarian science, art, and industry in the name of Comrade Reppo". From 1926 to 1927, the museum was closed. It was revived through the efforts of Sergei Nikolayevich Porshnyakov. An exhibition dedicated to the history of the city and its surroundings opened in a new building in 1989. In 2009, the museum moved to a new location.

== Exhibits ==
The exhibition space was created in 2009, comprising five halls and covering the period from the Neolithic age to the 1917 Russian Revolution.

== Facilities ==
The museum is located in a two-story stone house with a mezzanine in the historical part of Borovichi. The former house of an ex-mayor merchant of the 1st guild Matvey Shulgin, it dates from the middle of the 19th century. The museum building is listed as a monument of cultural heritage monument of regional importance.
