= Peretna =

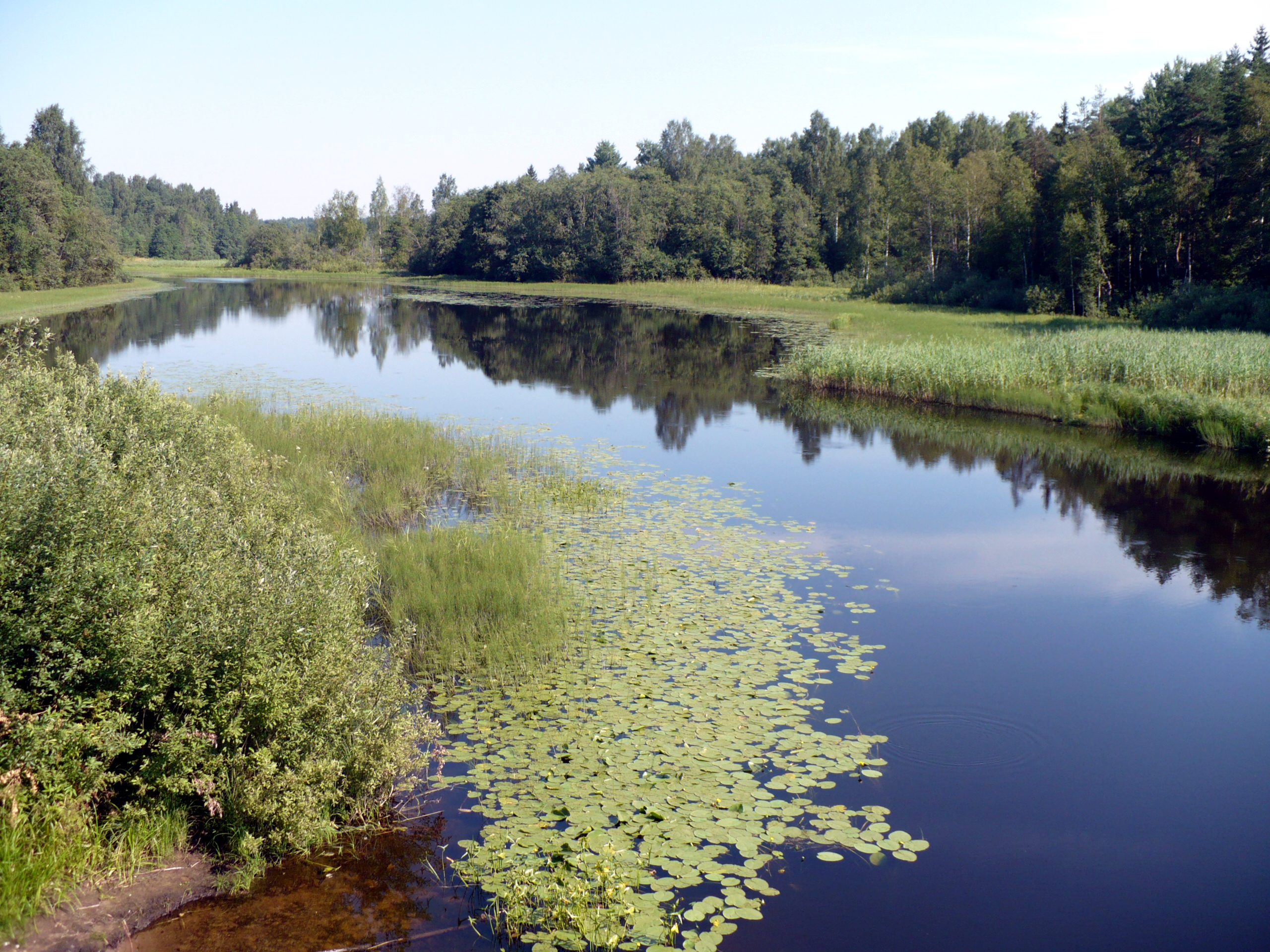
- Native name: Перетна (Russian)

Location
- Country: Russia

Physical characteristics
- Source: Lake Zaozyorye
- Mouth: Msta
  - coordinates: 58°33′27″N 33°28′04″E
- Length: 39 km (24 mi)
- Basin size: 905 km^{2} (349 sq mi)

Basin features
- Progression: Msta→ Lake Ilmen→ Volkhov→ Lake Ladoga→ Neva→ Gulf of Finland

The Peretna (Russian: Перетна) is a river in Okulovsky District of Novgorod Oblast, Russia. It is a left tributary of the Msta. It is 39 kilometres (24 mi) long, and the area of its basin is 905 square kilometres (349 sq mi). The town of Okulovka and the work settlement of Kulotino are located on the banks of the Peretna.

The source of the Peretna is in Lake Zaozyorye, west of the town of Okulovka. The river flows northeast and has its mouth in the village of Toporok. It crosses the railway line connecting Moscow and Saint Petersburg between the source and Okulovka.
