= Podberezye, Vladimir Oblast =

Podberezye Подберезье
- Selo
- Location within Vladimir Oblast Location within Russia
- Coordinates: 56°15′N 40°17′E
- Country: Russia
- Region: Vladimir Oblast
- District: Suzdalsky District
- Time zone: UTC+3:00

Podberezye (Russian: Подберезье) is a rural locality (a selo) in Novoalexandrovskoye Rural Settlement, Suzdalsky District, Vladimir Oblast, Russia. The population was 12 as of 2010. There are 7 streets.

== Geography ==
Podberezye is located 36 km southwest of Suzdal (the district's administrative centre) by road. Skorodumka is the nearest rural locality.
