= Bor, Kharovsky District, Vologda Oblast =

Bor Бор
- Village
- Location within Vologda Oblast Location within Russia
- Coordinates: 59°57′N 40°16′E
- Country: Russia
- Region: Vologda Oblast
- District: Kharovsky District
- Time zone: UTC+3:00

Bor (Russian: Бор) is a rural locality (a village) in Kharovskoye Rural Settlement, Kharovsky District, Vologda Oblast, Russia. The population was 8 as of 2002.

== Geography ==
Bor is located 12 km northeast of Kharovsk (the district's administrative centre) by road. Kosarikha is the nearest rural locality.
