= Rozhdestvo =

Rozhdestvo Рождество
- Village
- Location within Vladimir Oblast Location within Russia
- Coordinates: 56°05′N 39°29′E
- Country: Russia
- Region: Vladimir Oblast
- District: Petushinsky District
- Time zone: UTC+3:00

Rozhdestvo (Russian: Рождество) is a rural locality (a village) in Petushinskoye Rural Settlement, Petushinsky District, Vladimir Oblast, Russia. The population was 53 as of 2010. There are 3 streets.

== Geography ==
Rozhdestvo is located on the Bolshaya Lipnya River, 26 km north of Petushki (the district's administrative centre) by road. Veselovo is the nearest rural locality.
