= Bor, Cherepovetsky District, Vologda Oblast =

Bor Бор
- Village
- Location within Vologda Oblast Location within Russia
- Coordinates: 58°46′N 37°15′E
- Country: Russia
- Region: Vologda Oblast
- District: Cherepovetsky District
- Time zone: UTC+3:00

Bor (Russian: Бор) is a rural locality (a village) in Nikolo-Ramenskoye Rural Settlement, Cherepovetsky District, Vologda Oblast, Russia. The population was 51 as of 2002. There are 2 streets.

== Geography ==
Bor is located 94 km (58 mi) southwest of Cherepovets (the district's administrative centre) by road. Krasny Dvor is the nearest rural locality.
