= Bor, Totemsky District, Vologda Oblast =

Bor Бор
- Village
- Location within Vologda Oblast Location within Russia
- Coordinates: 59°35′N 42°18′E
- Country: Russia
- Region: Vologda Oblast
- District: Totemsky District
- Time zone: UTC+3:00

Bor (Russian: Бор) is a rural locality (a village) in Tolshmenskoye Rural Settlement, Totemsky District, Vologda Oblast, Russia. The population was 266 as of 2002. There are 4 streets.

== Geography ==
Bor is located 72 km southwest of Totma (the district's administrative centre) by road. Manylovo is the nearest rural locality.
