= Pankovka =

Pankovka Панковка
- Urban-type settlement
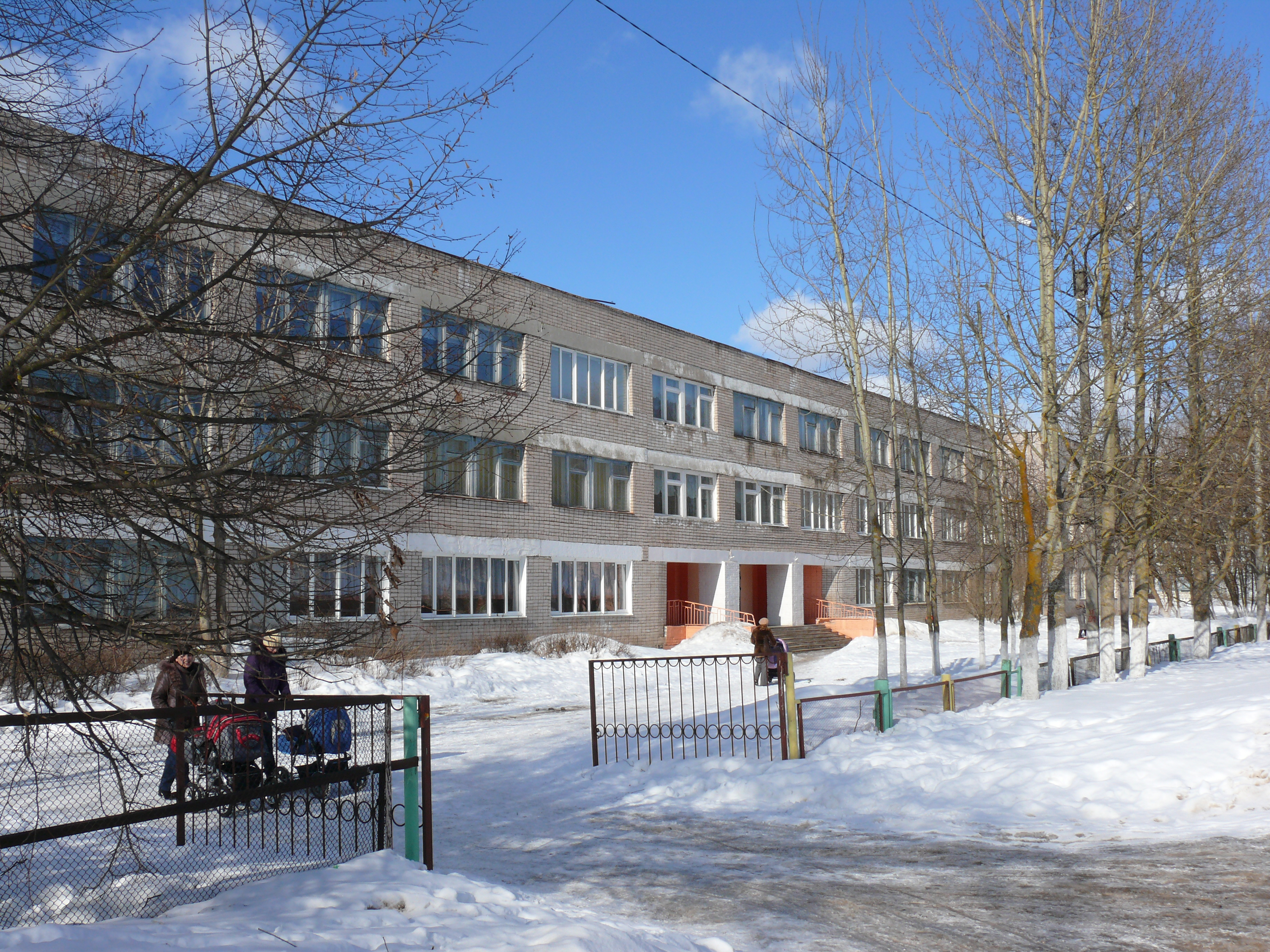
- School in Pankovka
- Interactive map of Pankovka
- Location of Pankovka Pankovka (Novgorod Oblast)
- Coordinates: 58°30′0″N 31°12′30″E
- Country: Russia
- Federal subject: Novgorod Oblast
- Administrative district: Novgorodsky District
- Urban-type settlement status since: March 28, 1977
- Elevation: 19 m (62 ft)

Population (2010 Census)
  - Total: 9,603
  - Estimate (2025): 10,283 (+7.1%)

Municipal status
  - Municipal district: Novgorodsky Municipal District
  - Urban settlement: Pankovskoye Urban Settlement
  - Capital of: Pankovskoye Urban Settlement
- Time zone: UTC+3 (MSK)
- Postal code: 173526
- OKTMO ID: 49625152051
- Website: admpankovka.ru

Pankovka (Russian: Панко́вка) is an urban locality (an urban-type settlement) in Novgorodsky District of Novgorod Oblast, Russia, located on the right bank of the Veryazha River, southwest of and immediately adjacent to Veliky Novgorod. Municipally, it is incorporated as Pankovskoye Urban Settlement in Novgorodsky Municipal District, one of the four urban settlements in the district. Population: 9,603 (2010 census); 10,057 (2002 census); 6,939 (1989 Soviet census).

== History ==
Historical affiliations

Novgorod Republic 1412–1478
Grand Duchy of Moscow 1478–1547
Tsardom of Russia 1547–1721
Russian Empire 1721–1917
Russian Republic 1917
Soviet Russia 1917–1922
Soviet Union 1922–1991
Russian Federation 1991–present

The village of Mostishchi was first mentioned in 1412. In this year, the Nikolayevsky Mostishchinsky Monastery was founded. In 1907, Mostishchi was mentioned as a part of Troitskaya Volost of Novgorodsky Uyezd of Novgorod Governorate. The origin of the settlement of Pankovka is unclear.

On August 1, 1927, the uyezds were abolished, and Novgorodsky District was established, with the center in the city of Novgorod. Both Pankovka and Mostishchi became a part of the district. The governorate was abolished as well, and the district belonged to Novgorod Okrug of Leningrad Oblast. On July 23, 1930 the okrugs were abolished, and the districts became directly subordinate to the oblast. Between August, 1941, and January, 1944 Pankovka was occupied by German troops. On July 5, 1944, Novgorodsky District was transferred to newly established Novgorod Oblast.

On March 28, 1977 the village of Mostishchi and the settlement of Pankovka were merged into the urban-type settlement of Pankovka.

== Economy ==
=== Industry ===
In Pankovka, there are many enterprises, mainly in construction industry.

=== Transportation ===
Pankovka is located on a highway connecting Veliky Novgorod and Shimsk, which also offers connections to Pskov and Staraya Russa.
