= Podberezye, Vologodsky District, Vologda Oblast =

Podberezye Подберезье
- Village
- Location within Vologda Oblast Location within Russia
- Coordinates: 59°41′N 39°14′E
- Country: Russia
- Region: Vologda Oblast
- District: Vologodsky District
- Time zone: UTC+3:00

Podberezye (Russian: Подберезье) is a rural locality (a village) in Novlenskoye Rural Settlement, Vologodsky District, Vologda Oblast, Russia. The population was 3 as of 2002.

== Geography ==
Podberezye is located 71 km northwest of Vologda (the district's administrative centre) by road. Gorka Pokrovskaya is the nearest rural locality.
