= Bor, Vozhegodsky District, Vologda Oblast =

Bor Бор
- Village
- Location within Vologda Oblast Location within Russia
- Coordinates: 60°29′N 39°25′E
- Country: Russia
- Region: Vologda Oblast
- District: Vozhegodsky District
- Time zone: UTC+3:00

Bor (Russian: Бор) is a rural locality (a village) in Beketovskoye Rural Settlement, Vozhegodsky District, Vologda Oblast, Russia. The population was 16 as of 2002.

== Geography ==
Bor is located 54 km west of Vozhega (the district's administrative centre) by road. Beketovskaya is the nearest rural locality.
