= Bor, Kaduysky District, Vologda Oblast =

Bor Бор
- Village
- Location within Vologda Oblast Location within Russia
- Coordinates: 59°18′N 36°41′E
- Country: Russia
- Region: Vologda Oblast
- District: Kaduysky District
- Time zone: UTC+3:00

Bor (Russian: Бор) is a rural locality (a village) in Semizerye Rural Settlement, Kaduysky District, Vologda Oblast, Russia. The population was 11 as of 2002.

== Geography ==
Bor is located 37 km northwest of Kaduy (the district's administrative centre) by road. Maza is the nearest rural locality.
