= Mikheyevo, Sokolsky District, Vologda Oblast =

Mikheyevo Михеево
- Village
- Location within Vologda Oblast Location within Russia
- Coordinates: 59°34′N 41°22′E
- Country: Russia
- Region: Vologda Oblast
- District: Sokolsky District
- Time zone: UTC+3:00

Mikheyevo (Russian: Михеево) is a rural locality (a village) in Biryakovskoye Rural Settlement, Sokolsky District, Vologda Oblast, Russia. The population was 8 as of 2002.

== Geography ==
Mikheyevo is located 99 km northeast of Sokol (the district's administrative centre) by road. Seleznevo is the nearest rural locality.
