= Podberezye, Velikoustyugsky District, Vologda Oblast =

Podberezye Подберезье
- Village
- Location within Vologda Oblast Location within Russia
- Coordinates: 60°49′N 46°31′E
- Country: Russia
- Region: Vologda Oblast
- District: Velikoustyugsky District
- Time zone: UTC+3:00

Podberezye (Russian: Подберезье) is a rural locality (a village) in Shemogodskoye Rural Settlement, Velikoustyugsky District, Vologda Oblast, Russia. The population was 4 as of 2002.

== Geography ==
Podberezye is located 29 km northeast of Veliky Ustyug (the district's administrative centre) by road. Penye is the nearest rural locality.
