= Mikheyevo, Komsomolsky District, Ivanovo Oblast =

Mikheyevo Михеево
- Village
- Location within Ivanovo Oblast Location within Russia
- Coordinates: 57°09′N 40°35′E
- Country: Russia
- Region: Ivanovo Oblast
- District: Komsomolsky District
- Time zone: UTC+3:00

Mikheyevo (Russian: Михеево) is a rural locality (a village) in Komsomolsky District, Ivanovo Oblast, Russia. Population: 121 (2010 census);

== Geography ==
This rural locality is located 20 kilometres (12 mi) from Komsomolsk (the district's administrative centre), 29 kilometres (18 mi) from Ivanovo (capital of Ivanovo Oblast) and 239 kilometres (149 mi) from Moscow. Kozhevnikovo is the nearest rural locality.
