= Mikheyevo, Cherepovetsky District, Vologda Oblast =

Mikheyevo Михеево
- Village
- Location within Vologda Oblast Location within Russia
- Coordinates: 58°44′N 37°41′E
- Country: Russia
- Region: Vologda Oblast
- District: Cherepovetsky District
- Time zone: UTC+3:00

Mikheyevo (Russian: Михеево) is a rural locality (a village) in Yagnitskoye Rural Settlement, Cherepovetsky District, Vologda Oblast, Russia. The population was 35 as of 2002.

== Geography ==
Mikheyevo is located 104 km (65 mi) south of Cherepovets (the district's administrative centre) by road. Petryayevo is the nearest rural locality.
