= Proletariy =

Proletariy Пролетарий
- Urban-type settlement
- Interactive map of Proletariy
- Location of Proletariy Proletariy (Novgorod Oblast)
- Coordinates: 58°26′N 31°42′E
- Country: Russia
- Federal subject: Novgorod Oblast
- Administrative district: Novgorodsky District
- Settlement: 1835
- Urban-type settlement status since: January 30, 1931
- Elevation: 19 m (62 ft)

Population (2010 Census)
  - Total: 5,145
  - Estimate (2025): 4,352 (−15.4%)

Municipal status
  - Municipal district: Novgorodsky Municipal District
  - Urban settlement: Proletarskoye Urban Settlement
  - Capital of: Proletarskoye Urban Settlement
- Time zone: UTC+3 (MSK)
- Postal code: 173530
- OKTMO ID: 49625154051
- Website: пролетарийадм.рф

Proletariy (Russian: Пролета́рий) is an urban locality (an urban-type settlement) in Novgorodsky District of Novgorod Oblast, Russia, located at the Nisha River close to its mouth, 30 kilometers (19 mi) east of Veliky Novgorod. Municipally, it is incorporated as Proletarskoye Urban Settlement in Novgorodsky Municipal District, one of the four urban settlements in the district. Population: 5,145 (2010 census); 5,362 (2002 census); 5,753 (1989 Soviet census).

== History ==
The settlement was first mentioned in 1495 as Seltso u Nishi. At that point, it was a part of Derevskaya Pyatina of Novgorod Lands. In 1835, a windmill was built here by the engineer and landowner Kazimir Raykhel (Casimir Reichel). The area became known as Novaya Melnitsa, which means "The New Mill". In 1885, his son, Pyotr Raykhel, built a porcelain factory. In 1892, the factory was sold to Ivan Kuznetsov. In 1918, the factory was confiscated by the state, and in 1922 the settlement serving the factory was renamed Proletariy.

Effective October 1, 1927, Bronnitsky District with the administrative center in the selo of Bronnitsa was established as a part of Novgorod Okrug of Leningrad Oblast. On July 23, 1930, the okrugs were abolished, and the districts became directly subordinate to the oblast. On January 30, 1931, the urban-type settlement of Proletariy was established in Bronnitsky District as a merger of the selo of Proletariy, the selo of Novaya Melnitsa, and the village of Zolotaya Niva. On March 11, 1931 the district was renamed Mstinsky District. On January 1, 1932 Mstinsky District was abolished and merged into Novgorod District. On March 11, 1941 Mstinsky District was re-established. It also included parts of Krestetsky District. The district center was established in Proletariy. On July 5, 1944, Mstinsky District was transferred to newly established Novgorod Oblast. On January 1, 1963, Mstinsky District was abolished. After a sequence of administrative reforms, Proletariy was transferred to Novgorodsky District.

== Economy ==
=== Industry ===
The porcelain factory, currently known as Novgorod Porcelain Manufacture, is still in operation. Besides, Proletariy has an experimental chemical plant and a sawmill.

=== Transportation ===
Proletariy is located on the M10 highway connecting Moscow and Saint Petersburg, specifically on the branch of the highway which connects it with the city of Veliky Novgorod (the southern entrance).

== Culture and recreation ==
Proletariy contains three objects classified as cultural and historical heritage of local significance. They are the Kuznetsov estate with the park and a monument to fallen soldiers.
