= Kulotino, Novgorod Oblast =

Kulotino Кулотино
- Work settlement
- Interactive map of Kulotino
- Location of Kulotino Kulotino (Novgorod Oblast)
- Coordinates: 58°27′N 33°23′E
- Country: Russia
- Federal subject: Novgorod Oblast
- Administrative district: Okulovsky District
- Selsoviet: settlementKulotinskoye Settlement
- Founded: 1882
- Urban-type settlement status since: 25 June 1928
- Elevation: 92 m (302 ft)

Population (2010 Census)
  - Total: 2,942
  - Estimate (2025): 1,904 (−35.3%)

Administrative status
  - Capital of: Kulotinskoye Settlement

Municipal status
  - Municipal district: Okulovsky Municipal District
  - Urban settlement: Kulotinskoye Urban Settlement
  - Capital of: Kulotinskoye Urban Settlement
- Time zone: UTC+3 (MSK)
- Postal code: 174335
- OKTMO ID: 49628154051

Kulotino (Russian: Куло́тино) is an urban locality (a work settlement) in Okulovsky District of Novgorod Oblast, Russia, located on the Peretna River a few kilometers northeast of the town of Okulovka. Municipally, along with seventeen rural localities, it is incorporated as Kulotinskoye Urban Settlement in Okulovsky Municipal District, one of the three urban settlements in the district. Population: 2,942 (2010 census); 3,430 (2002 census); 4,304 (1989 Soviet census).

== History ==
In 1882, a textile factory was built, which was the foundation of Kulotino. The factory was located close to the selo of Polishchi. In the beginning of the 20th century, Kulotino was a village in Okulovskaya Volost of Krestetsky Uyezd (1918–1927 Malovishersky Uyezd) of Novgorod Governorate. On 1 August 1927, the uyezds were abolished and Kulotino was transferred to newly established Okulovsky District. Novgorod Governorate was abolished as well, and the district became a part of Borovichi Okrug of Leningrad Oblast. In the end of 1927, Polishchsky Selsoviet was renamed Kulotinsky Selsoviet, and on 25 June 1928, Kulotino was granted urban-type settlement status. On 23 July 1930, the okrugs were abolished, and the districts were directly subordinated to the oblast. On 5 July 1944, Okulovsky District was transferred to newly established Novgorod Oblast and remained there ever since.

== Economy ==
=== Industry ===
Kulotino was founded as a settlement around the textile factory. The factory was defunct as of 2011.

=== Transportation ===
Kulotino is a railway station on the line connecting Okulovka and Nebolchi. As of 2011, there was one suburban train per day calling at Kulotino. The settlement is also connected by road with Okulovka.

== Culture and recreation ==
In Kulotino, there are four cultural heritage monuments of local significance. Two of them are archaeological sites, and two are the graves of the soldiers fallen in World War II. Kulotino was not occupied during the war but was for an extensive period located close to the front line.
