= Uglovka, Novgorod Oblast =

Uglovka Угловка
- Work settlement
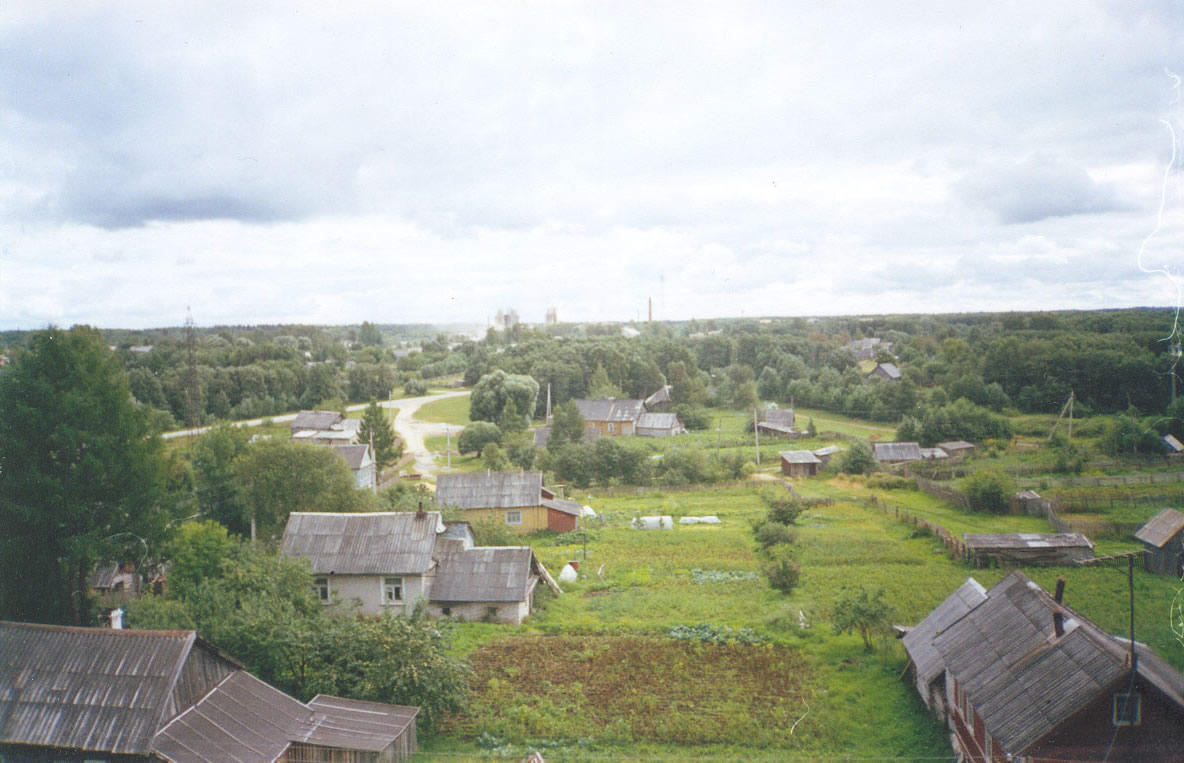
- A panorama of Uglovka
- Interactive map of Uglovka
- Location of Uglovka Uglovka (Novgorod Oblast)
- Coordinates: 58°13′N 33°31′E
- Country: Russia
- Federal subject: Novgorod Oblast
- Administrative district: Okulovsky District
- Urban-type settlement status since: November 9, 1938
- Elevation: 179 m (587 ft)

Population (2010 Census)
  - Total: 3,064
  - Estimate (2025): 2,131 (−30.5%)

Municipal status
  - Municipal district: Okulovsky Municipal District
  - Urban settlement: Uglovskoye Urban Settlement
  - Capital of: Uglovskoye Urban Settlement
- Time zone: UTC+3 (MSK)
- Postal code: 174360
- OKTMO ID: 49628162051

Uglovka (Russian: Угло́вка) is an urban locality (a work settlement) in Okulovsky District of Novgorod Oblast, Russia, located on the Moscow – Saint Petersburg Railway. Municipally, it is incorporated as Uglovskoye Urban Settlement in Okulovsky Municipal District, one of the three urban settlements in the district. Population: 3,064 (2010 census); 3,553 (2002 census); 4,041 (1989 Soviet census).

== History ==
The village of Ugol (Russian: Угол) was first mentioned in a chronicle in 1495. The development of the area started in 1851 when Uglovka became a railway station on the Nikolayevskaya Railway which connected Moscow and Saint Petersburg. Uglovka developed first as a settlement serving the railway stations, and eventually the limestone extraction started. In the beginning of the 20th century, it was a part of Borovyonskaya Volost of Valdaysky Uyezd of Novgorod Governorate. In 1921, it was transferred to Shegrinskaya Volost of Borovichsky Uyezd.

On August 1, 1927, the uyezds were abolished, and Uglovsky District with the center in the railway station of Uglovka was established as part of Borovichi Okrug of Leningrad Oblast. On July 23, 1930, the okrugs were abolished, and the districts became directly subordinate to the oblast. On January 1, 1932, Uglovsky District was abolished and split between Borovichsky, Okulovsky, and Bologovsky Districts. Uglovka became a part of Okulovsky District. On July 5, 1944, Okulovsky District was transferred to newly established Novgorod Oblast and remained there ever since.

Urban-type settlement status was granted to Uglovka on November 9, 1938.

== Economy ==
=== Industry ===
The economy of Uglovka is based on limestone extraction and processing.

=== Transportation ===
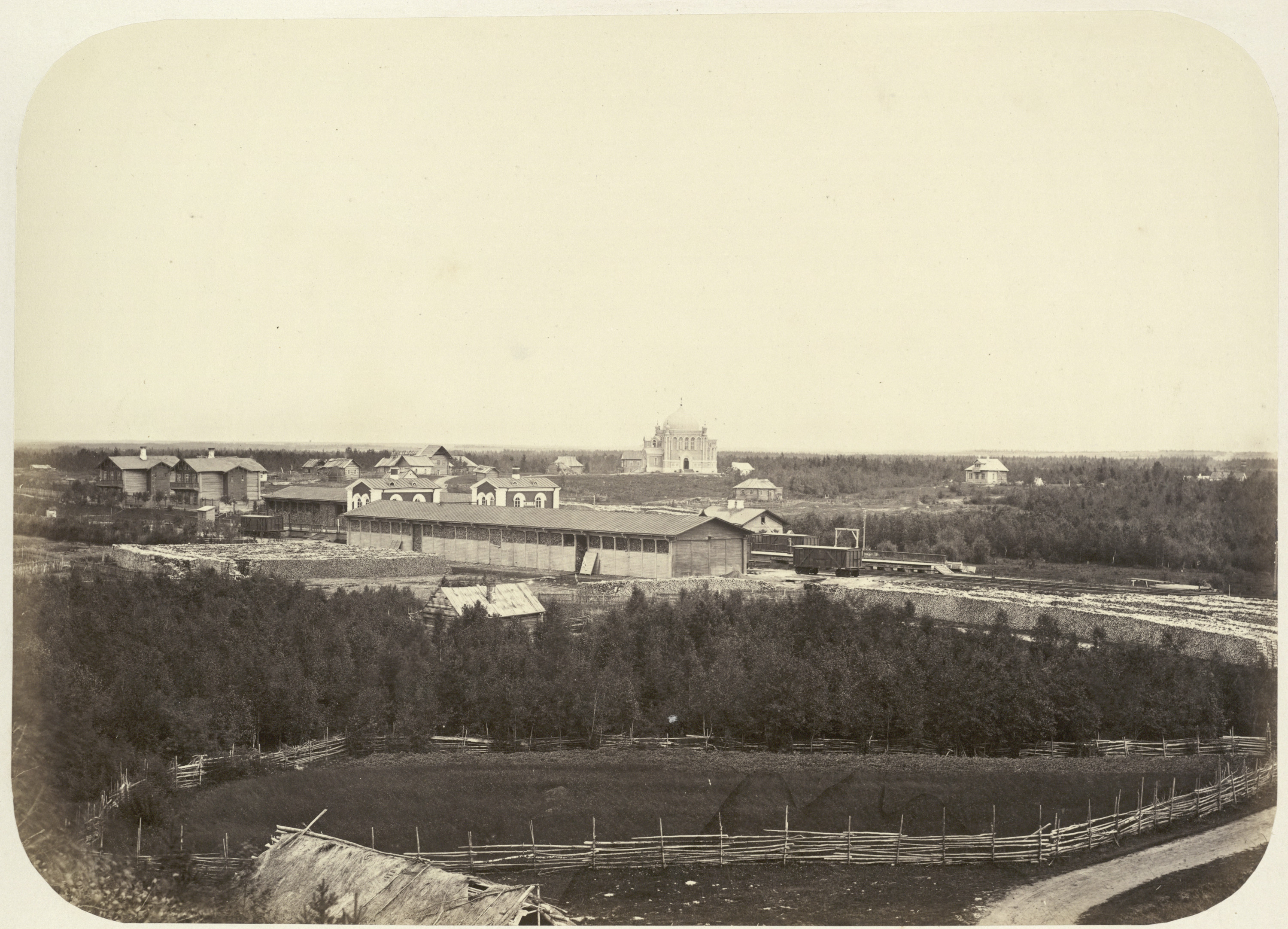
Uglovka in the 1860s

Uglovka has a station on the Moscow – Saint Petersburg Railway. This was the first long-distance railway constructed in Russia, opened in 1851. Another railway line going east of Uglovka connects it to Borovichi.

There is a road connection to Okulovka, as well as local roads.

== Culture and recreation ==
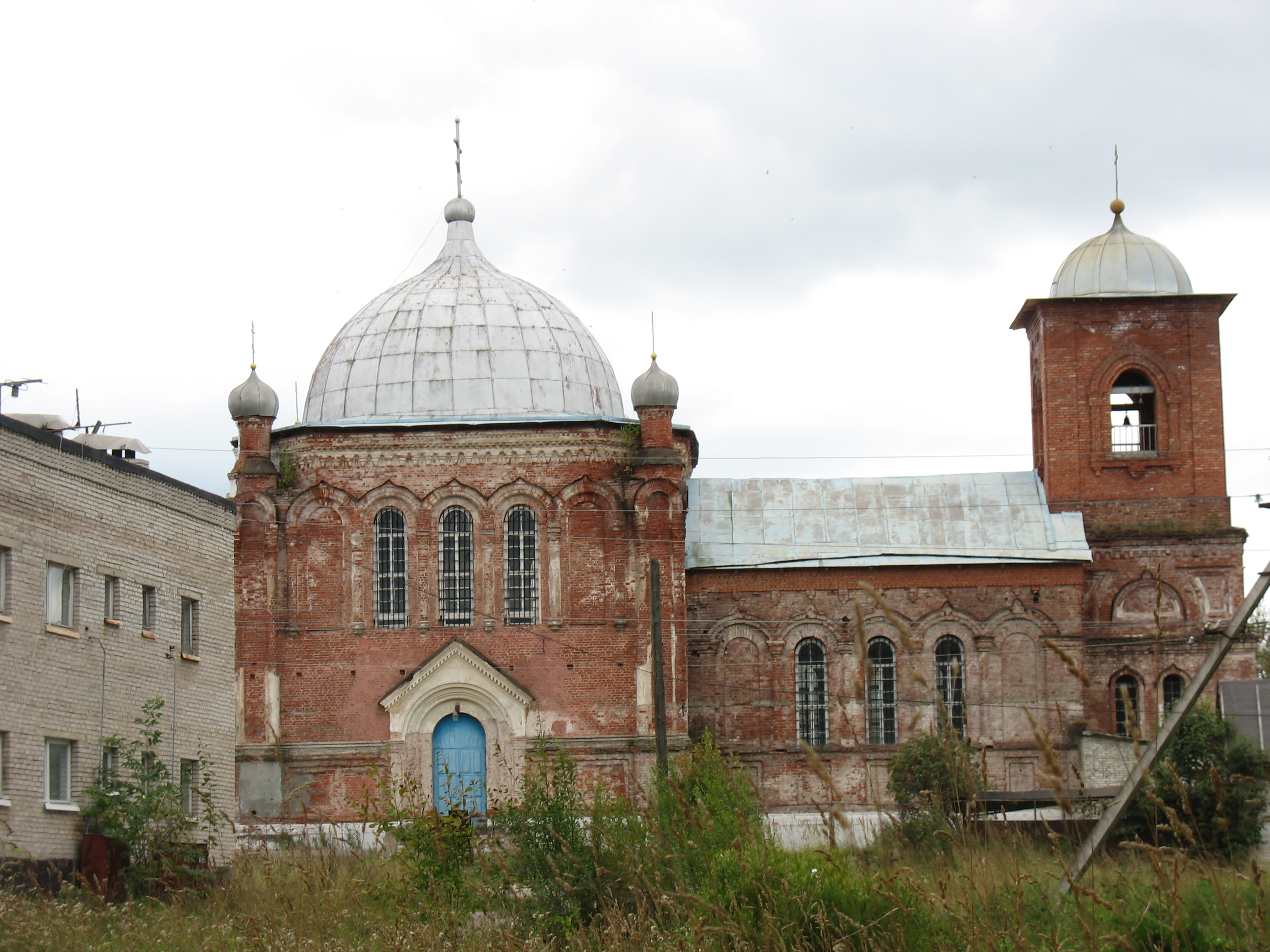
Church of the Nativity of Christ in Uglovka

Uglovka contains two objects classified as cultural and historical heritage of local significance. One of them is the Church of the Nativity of Christ, and the other one is a grave of two soldiers fallen in the Second World War. Uglovka was never occupied by the German troops, but was close to the front line.
