= Moshenskoy District =

Moshenskoy District Мошенской район (Russian)
- District
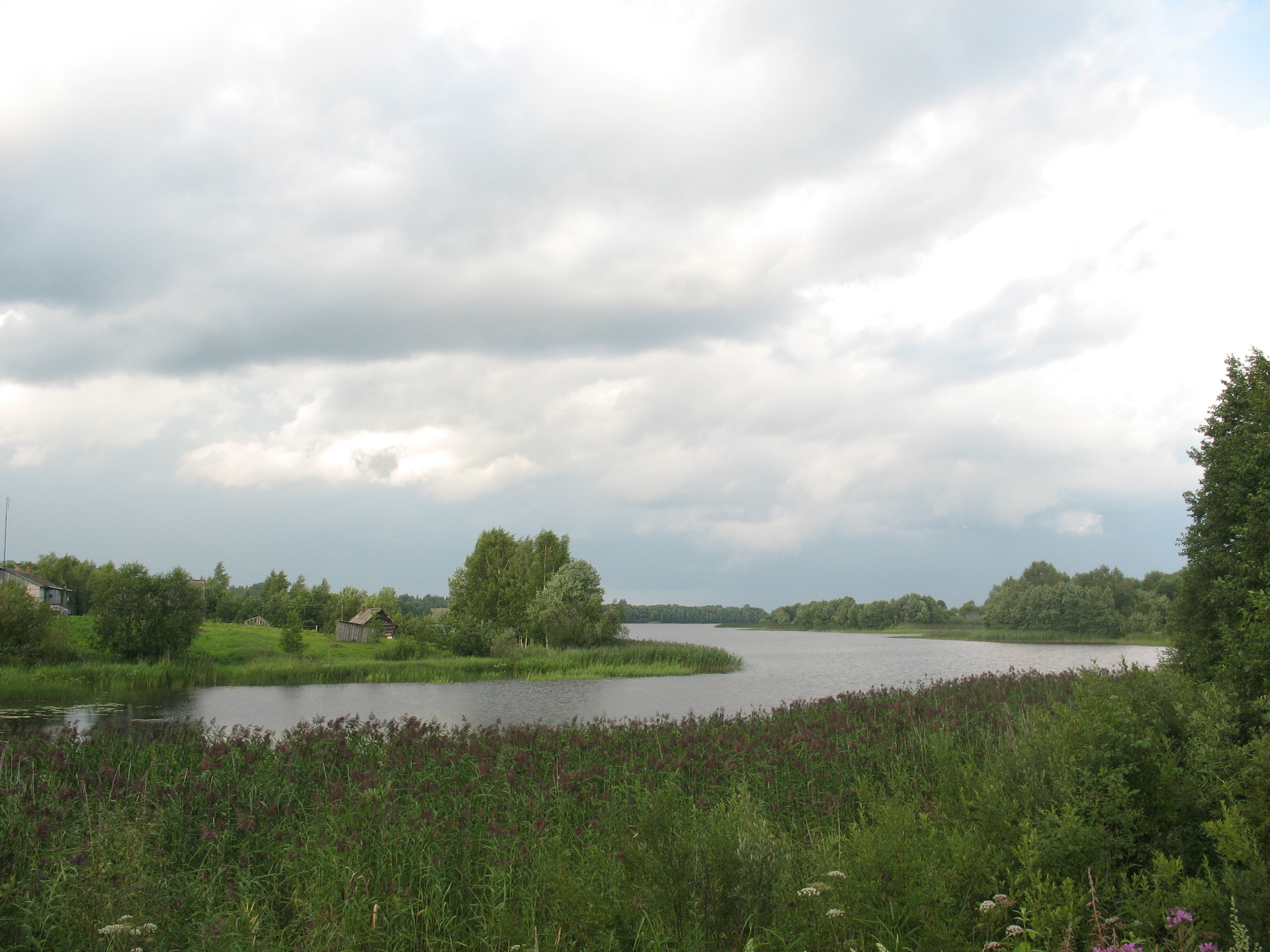

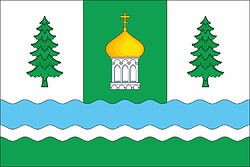
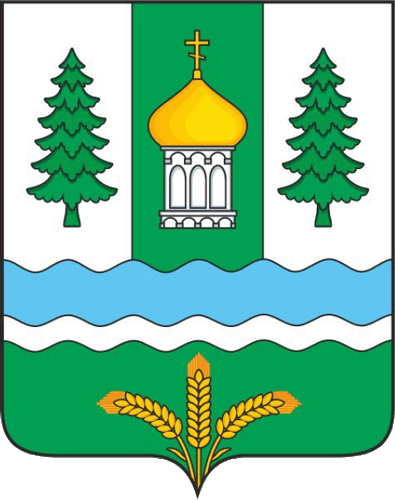
- Flag Coat of arms
- Location of Moshenskoy District in Novgorod Oblast
- Coordinates: 58°31′N 34°34′E
- Country: Russia
- Federal subject: Novgorod Oblast
- Established: October 1, 1927
- Administrative center: Moshenskoye

Area
  - Total: 2,568 km^{2} (992 sq mi)

Population (2010 Census)
  - Total: 7,309
  - Density: 2.846/km^{2} (7.372/sq mi)
  - Urban: 0%
  - Rural: 100%

Administrative structure
  - Administrative divisions: 5 settlement
  - Inhabited localities: 205 rural localities

Municipal structure
  - Municipally incorporated as: Moshenskoy Municipal District
  - Municipal divisions: 0 urban settlements, 5 rural settlements
- Time zone: UTC+3 (MSK)
- OKTMO ID: 49624000
- Website: http://www.moshensk.ru/

Moshenskoy District (Russian: Мошенско́й райо́н) is an administrative and municipal district (raion), one of the twenty-one in Novgorod Oblast, Russia. It is located in the east of the oblast and borders with Khvoyninsky District in the north, Pestovsky District in the east, Lesnoy District of Tver Oblast in the southeast, Udomelsky District of Tver Oblast in the south, and with Borovichsky District in the west. The area of the district is 2,568 square kilometers (992 sq mi). Its administrative center is the rural locality (a selo) of Moshenskoye. Population: 7,309 (2010 census); 9,486 (2002 Census); 10,679 (1989 Soviet census). The population of Moshenskoye accounts for 34.3% of the district's total population.

== Geography ==
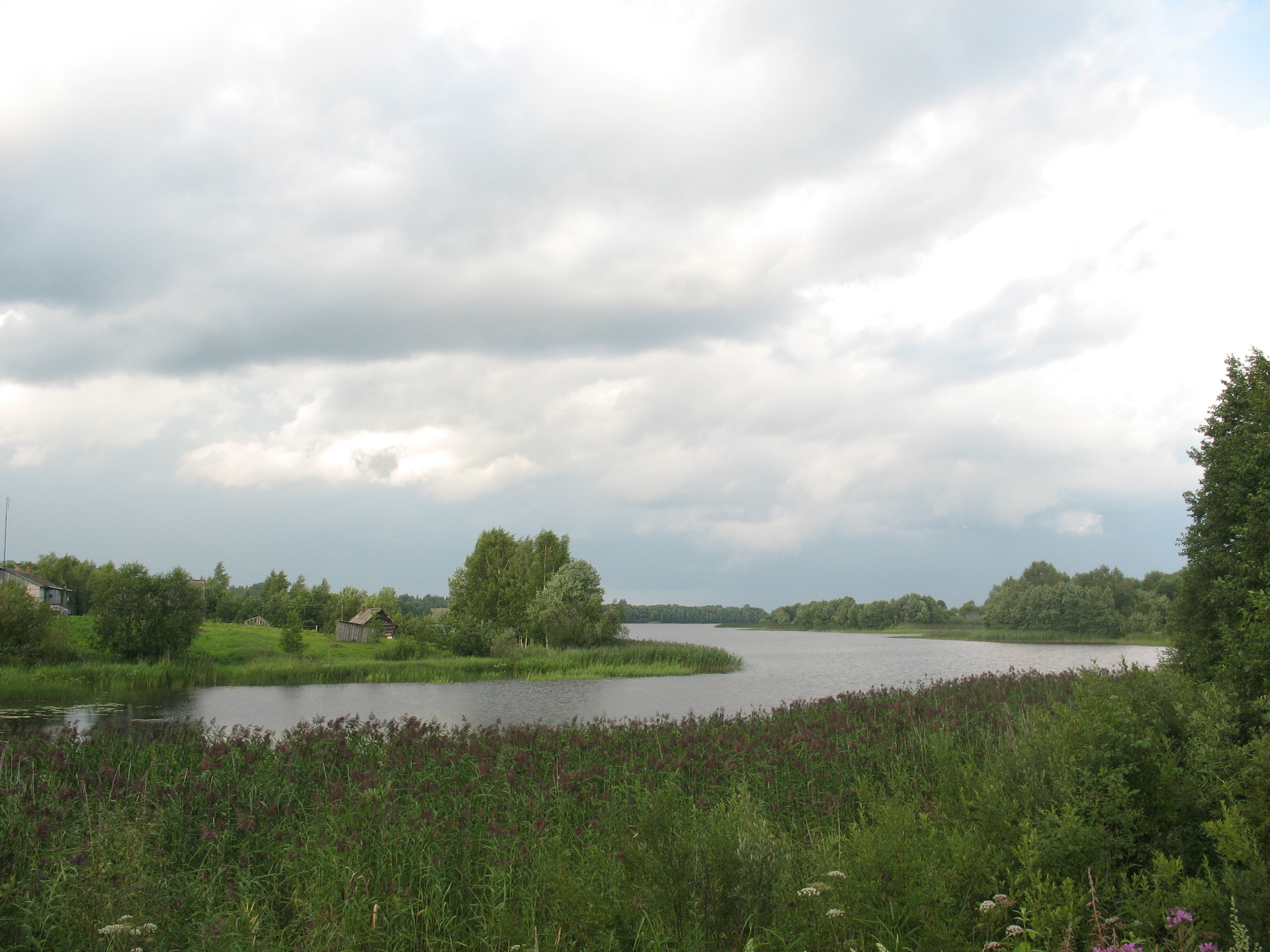
Lake Ostrovenskoye

The western part of the district lies in the basin of the Msta River, with its main tributary within the limits of the district being the Uver. The eastern part belongs to the basin of the Mologa. The principal river in the basin of the Mologa on the territory of the district is the Kobozha. Since the Msta belongs to the basins of the Volkhov River and the Baltic Sea, whereas the Mologa drains to the Volga and the Caspian Sea, the divide between the Caspian Sea and the Atlantic Ocean crosses the district from north to south.

There are many lakes in the district. The biggest ones are Lake Meglino, which is shared with Pestovsky District and drains into the Mologa, Lake Velikoye, the source of the Kobozha, and Lake Korobozha, the source of the Uver.

Most of the area of the district is covered by forests.

== History ==
The area was originally populated by Balto-Finnic peoples; Krivich Slavs arrived later. By the 16th century, the area belonged to Bezhetskaya pyatina of the Grand Duchy of Moscow. The selo of Moshenskoye was first mentioned in 1545. During the Time of Troubles, the area supported the cause of Minin and Pozharsky. In 1613, there was a battle with Swedish troops, which the Swedish lost.

In the course of the administrative reform carried out in 1708 by Peter the Great, the area was included into Ingermanland Governorate (known since 1710 as Saint Petersburg Governorate). In 1727, separate Novgorod Governorate was split off. In 1776, the area was transferred to Novgorod Viceroyalty. In 1796, the viceroyalty was abolished, and the area, which was a part of Borovichsky Uyezd, was transferred to Novgorod Governorate. Much of the current territory of the district was a part of Nikolo-Moshenskaya Volost of Borovichsky Uyezd.

In August 1927, the governorates and uyezds were abolished. Moshenskoy District, with the administrative center in the selo of Moshenskoye, was established within Borovichi Okrug of Leningrad Oblast effective October 1, 1927. It included parts of former Borovichsky Uyezd. On July 23, 1930, the okrugs were abolished, and the districts were directly subordinated to the oblast. On September 20, 1931, Orekhovsky and Opechensky Districts were abolished and merged into Moshenskoy District. On January 1, 1932, a part of abolished Konchansky District was merged into Moshenskoy District. On August 3, 1939, Opechensky District, merged into Moshenskoy District in 1931, was restored. On July 5, 1944, Moshenskoy District was transferred to newly established Novgorod Oblast, where it remained ever since with a brief interruption between 1963 and 1965. On February 1, 1963, the district was abolished in the course of the abortive Nikita Khrushchev's administrative reform and merged into Borovichsky Rural District. On January 12, 1965, Moshenskoy District was re-established.

=== Abolished districts ===
In 1927, Orekhovsky District with the administrative center in the selo of Klimkovo and Konchansky District with the administrative center in the selo of Konchanskoye were also established, both as a part of Borovichi Okrug of Leningrad Oblast. On September 20, 1931, Orekhovsky District was abolished and merged into Moshenskoy District. On January 1, 1932, Konchansky District was abolished and split between Borovichsky, Moshenskoy, and Khvoyninsky Districts.

Effective October 1, 1927, Opechensky District with the administrative center in the selo of Opechensky Posad was established as well, as a part of Borovichi Okrug of Leningrad Oblast. On September 20, 1931, Opechensky District was abolished and merged into Borovichsky District, but on August 3, 1939, it was restored. On July 5, 1944, the district was transferred to Novgorod Oblast. On November 17, 1960, Opechensky District was abolished, and its area was split between Borovichsky and Moshenskoy Districts.

== Economy ==
=== Industry ===
In the district, there are small-scale enterprises of timber industry and food industry.

=== Agriculture ===
As of 2012, the total area for use in agriculture was 331 square kilometers (128 sq mi). The main agricultural specializations in the district were cattle breeding (with meat and milk production) and growing of potato and crops.

=== Transportation ===
A paved road connecting Pestovo and Borovichi crosses the district from east to west. It is connected to the selo of Moshenskoye by a local road. There are also other local roads, as well as local bus traffic.

The Uver River was used as a part of Vyshnevolotsky Canal System constructed in the 18th century to bypass the rapids on the Msta. The system became outdated already in the 19th century and was eventually surpassed by Tikhvinskaya water system and by Mariinsk Canal System. It is no longer in use.

== Culture and recreation ==
The district contains two cultural heritage monuments of federal significance and additionally ninety-three objects classified as cultural and historical heritage of local significance. Most of these are archaeological sites.

Alexey Maksheyev, an author and historian, as well as a military officer, was born in Olekhovo, which was his family estate and is currently located within the limits of the district. He spent long periods in the estate and was buried there.

The family of the author Vitaly Bianki lived in the village in Mikheyevo between 1935 and 1942, and the author visited the village on several occasions. Currently, the village holds an annual conference devoted to Bianki.
