= Borovichi =

Town in Novgorod Oblast, Russia

Borovichi Боровичи
- Town
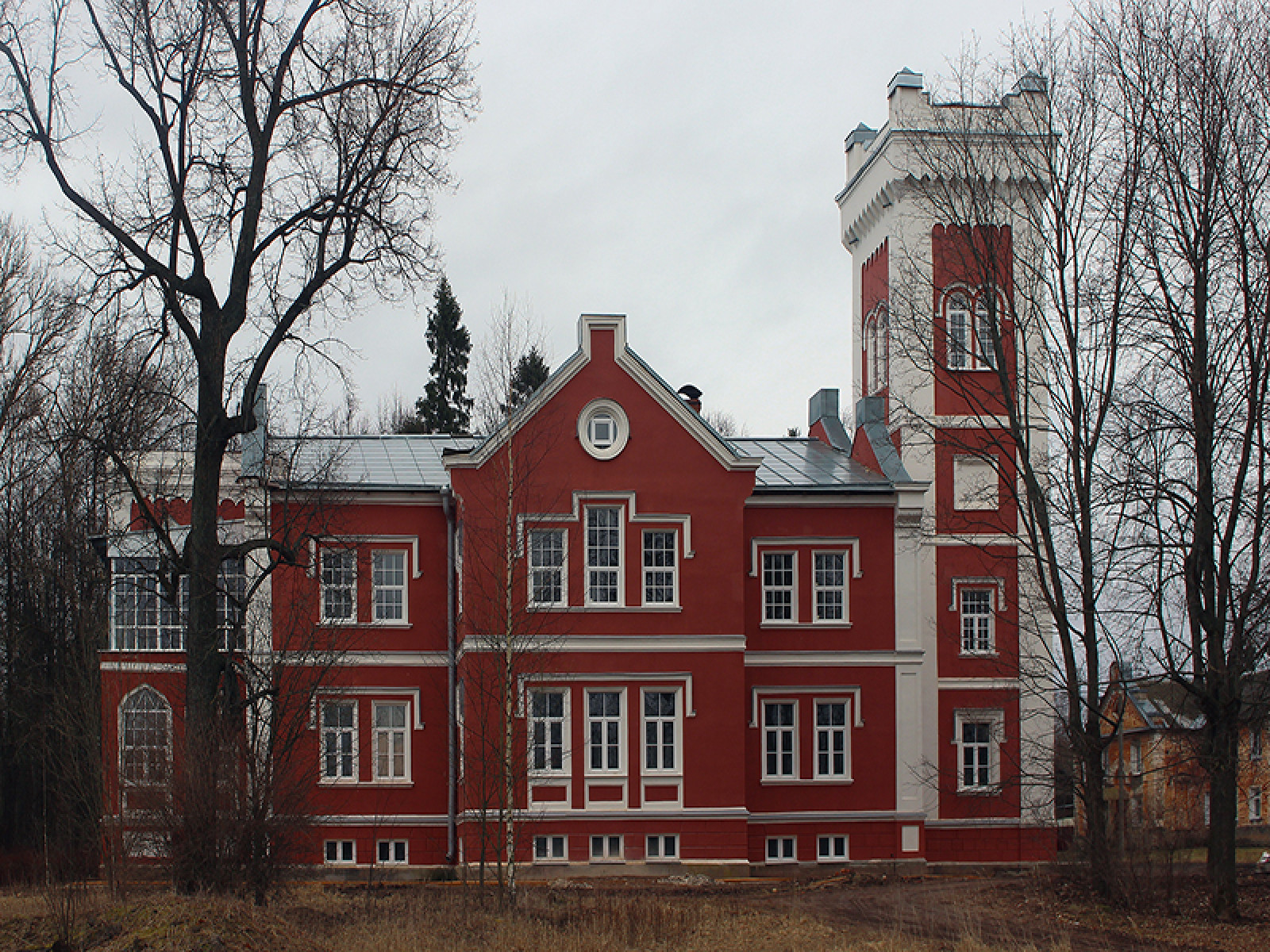
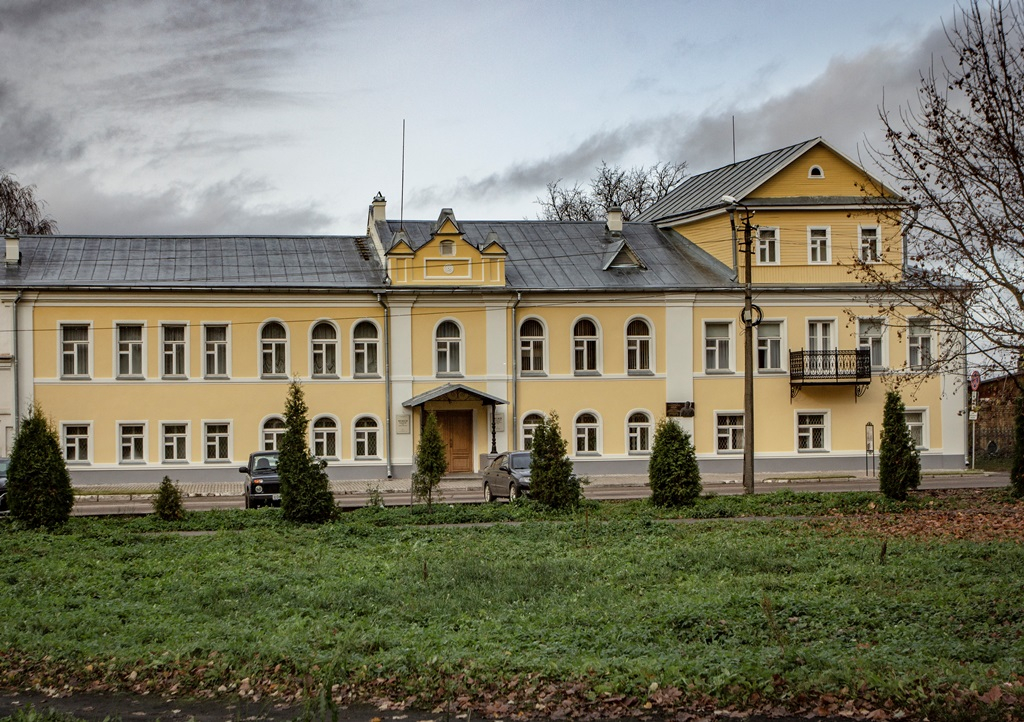
- Top down: Neklyudov Estate • Borovichi Museum of Local History

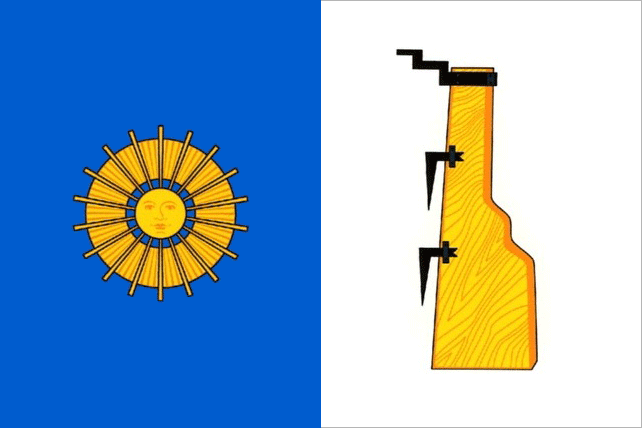
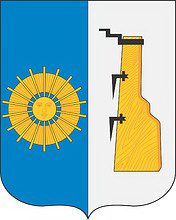
- Flag Coat of arms
- Interactive map of Borovichi
- Location of Borovichi Borovichi (Novgorod Oblast)
- Coordinates: 58°24′N 33°55′E
- Country: Russia
- Federal subject: Novgorod Oblast
- First mentioned: 1495
- Town status since: 1770
- Elevation: 90 m (300 ft)

Population (2010 Census)
  - Total: 53,690
  - Estimate (2025): 46,325 (−13.7%)
  - Rank: 307th in 2010

Administrative status
  - Subordinated to: town of oblast significance of Borovichi
  - Capital of: town of oblast significance of Borovichi, Borovichsky District

Municipal status
  - Municipal district: Borovichsky Municipal District
  - Urban settlement: Borovichi Urban Settlement
  - Capital of: Borovichsky Municipal District, Borovichi Urban Settlement
- Time zone: UTC+3 (MSK)
- Postal codes: 174400, 174401, 174403–174409, 174411, 174421
- OKTMO ID: 49606101001
- Website: borovichi-adm.ru

Borovichi population
- 2010 Census: 53,690
- 2002 Census: 57,755
- 1989 Census: 63,009
- 1979 Census: 59,646

Borovichi (Russian: Боровичи́) is the second largest town in Novgorod Oblast, Russia, located on the Msta River in the northern spurs of the Valdai Hills, 194 kilometers (121 mi) east of Veliky Novgorod, the administrative center of the oblast. As of the 2010 Census, its population was 53,690.

== History ==
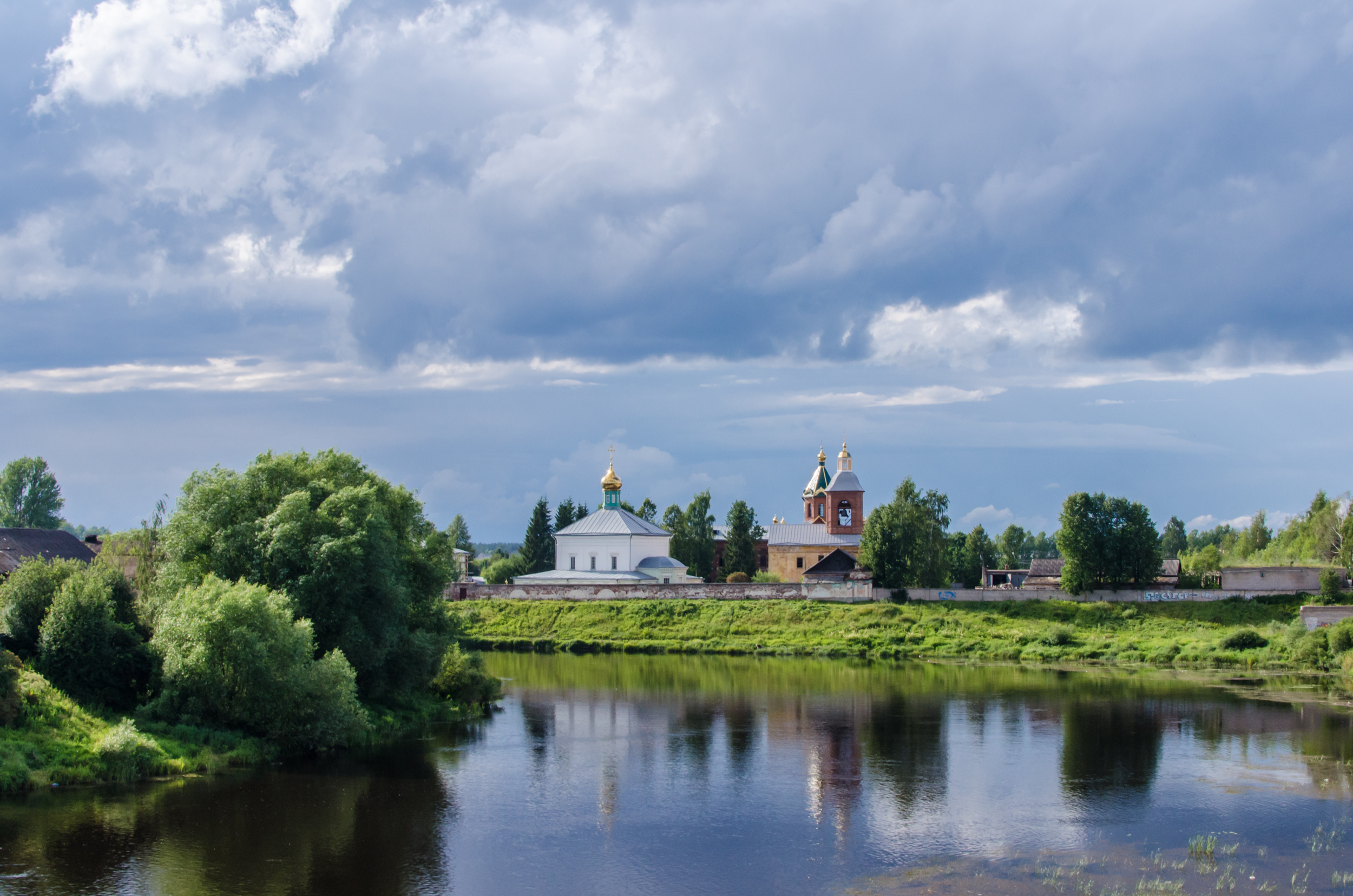
Holy Spirit Monastery

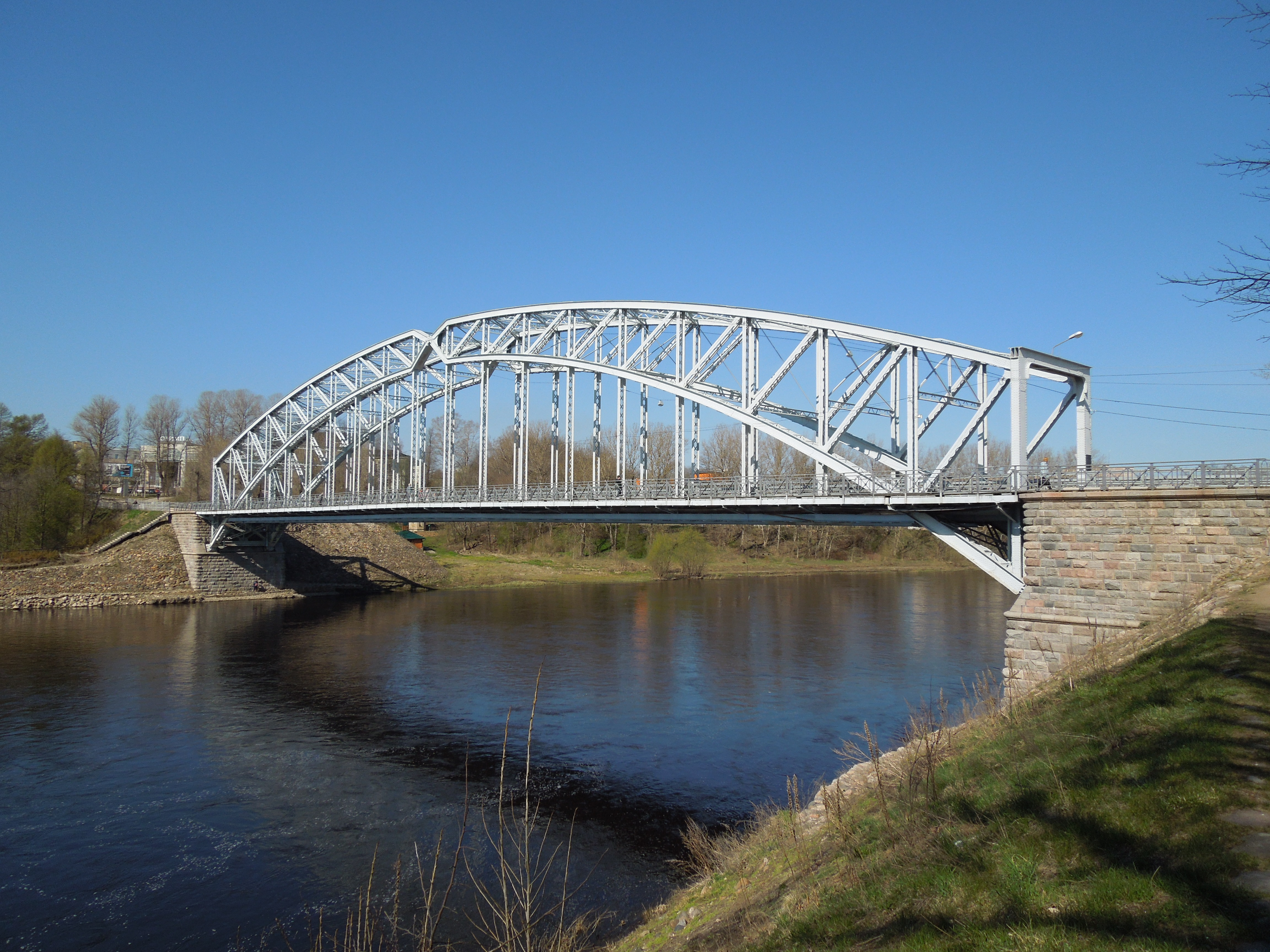
The arch bridge across the Msta

The Msta River was an important waterway since at least the 10th century, since it connected Novgorod with the basins of the Volga and the Northern Dvinas. The settlement was first mentioned in 1495. It was granted town status in 1770 by Catherine the Great. The main occupation of the town's inhabitants was piloting ships through the rapids of the Msta River that used to be a part of an important waterway connecting Central Russia with the Baltic Sea (hence a rudder appears on the town's coat of arms granted by Catherine the Great). However, by the mid-19th century, after opening of the Volga–Baltic Waterway and the Moscow-Saint Petersburg Railway, the significance of the Msta River as a transport route has decreased.

In the course of the administrative reform carried out in 1708 by Peter the Great, the area was included into Ingermanland Governorate (known since 1710 as Saint Petersburg Governorate). In 1727, separate Novgorod Governorate was split off. In 1773, Borovichsky Uyezd was established. In 1776, the area was transferred to Novgorod Viceroyalty. In 1796, the viceroyalty was abolished and Borovichsky Uyezd was transferred to Novgorod Governorate.

Sources of fire clay were discovered near the town in the 19th century, and the first fire brick manufacturing plant opened in the region in 1855. In 1878, a railway branch connected the town to Uglovka station of the Moscow-Saint Petersburg Railway, which allowed to establish several large fire brick plants in 1880. Now about half of the town's population is employed in the fire brick industry.

In 1905, the first arch bridge in Russia was built in Borovichi across the Msta.

On August 1, 1927, the uyezds were abolished, and Borovichsky District was established, with the administrative center in Borovichi. The district was a part of Borovichi Okrug of Leningrad Oblast. The town of Borovichi initially belonged to the district, but from 1930 it was elevated in status to that of a town of oblast significance. On July 5, 1944, Borovichsky District was transferred to newly established Novgorod Oblast and remained there ever since.

== Administrative and municipal status ==
Within the framework of administrative divisions, Borovichi serves as the administrative center of Borovichsky District, even though it is not a part of it. As an administrative division, it is incorporated separately as the town of oblast significance of Borovichi—an administrative unit with the status equal to that of the districts (one of the three in Novgorod Oblast). As a municipal division, the town of oblast significance of Borovichi is incorporated within Borovichsky Municipal District as Borovichi Urban Settlement.

== Economy ==
=== Industry ===
In Borovichi, there are enterprises of construction material production, timber industry, and food industry. There is also production of woodworking machines and of engines.

=== Transportation ===
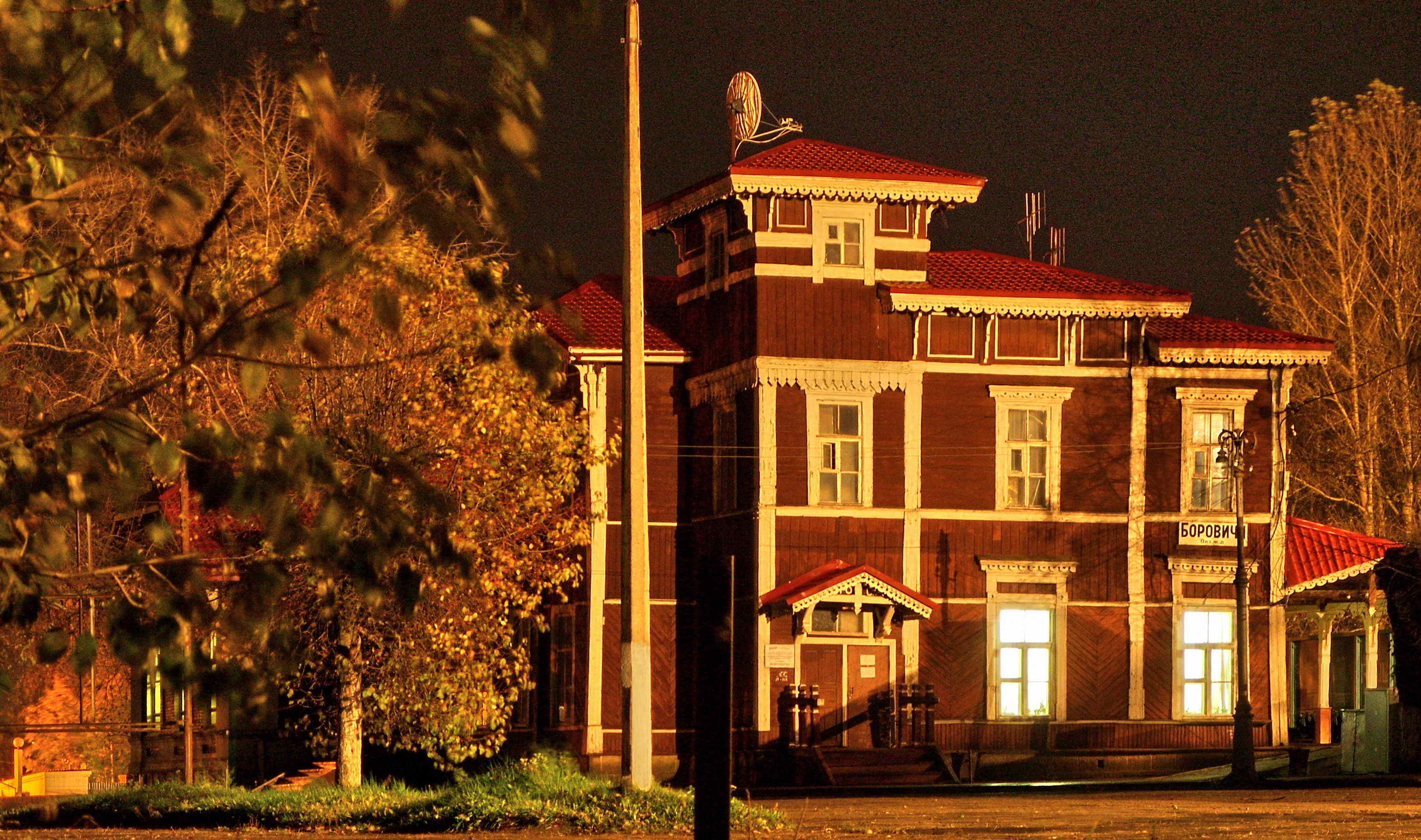
Borovichi railway station

Borovichi is connected by a railroad with Uglovka and thus with the railway between Moscow and Saint Petersburg.

There are road connections to Tikhvin (via Lyubytino), Okulovka, and Pestovo. Borovichi is a local bus transportation hub.

== Culture and recreation ==
The town of Borovichi contains one cultural heritage monument of federal significance—the arch bridge across the Msta—and additionally ninety-nine objects classified as cultural and historical heritage of local significance.

The town is home to the Borovichi Regional Museum.

The famous rapids of the Msta River popular among tourists are located just upstream from Borovichi.

== Sports ==
- Bandy Club Borovichi is the only professional sports team in Novgorod Oblast. In 2010, it was playing in the High Division (the first tier) of the Russian Bandy Super League, but in 2011 due to financial difficulties it was relegated to the First Division (the second tier). Their home arena has the capacity of 5,000.

== Notable people ==
- Alexey Kuznetsov, Soviet official
- Sergei Gennadyevich Yegorov, Russian association football player

== Twin towns and sister cities ==
Borovichi is twinned with:

- Binghamton, New York, United States
- Haapsalu, Estonia
- Pereira, Colombia
- Suolahti (consolidated in 2007 with Sumiainen to make Äänekoski), Finland (status unknown)
