= Korotnevaya =

Korotnevaya Коротневая
- Village
- Location within Vologda Oblast Location within Russia
- Coordinates: 59°30′N 36°30′E
- Country: Russia
- Region: Vologda Oblast
- District: Kaduysky District
- Time zone: UTC+3:00

Korotnevaya (Russian: Коротневая) is a rural locality (a village) in Semizerye Rural Settlement, Kaduysky District, Vologda Oblast, Russia. The population was 12 as of 2002.

== Geography ==
Korotnevaya is located 61 km northwest of Kaduy (the district's administrative centre) by road. Baranovskaya is the nearest rural locality.
