= Alekanovo =

Village in Vologda Oblast, Russia

Alekanovo Алеканово
- Village
- Location within Vologda Oblast Location within Russia
- Coordinates: 59°27′N 36°40′E
- Country: Russia
- Region: Vologda Oblast
- District: Kaduysky District
- Time zone: UTC+3:00

Alekanovo (Russian: Алеканово) is a rural locality (a village) in Semizerye Rural Settlement, Kaduysky District, Vologda Oblast, Russia. The population was 3 as of 2002.

== Geography ==
Alekanovo is located 63 km northwest of Kaduy (the district's administrative centre) by road. Yeremeyevo is the nearest rural locality.
