= Baranovskaya, Kaduysky District, Vologda Oblast =

Baranovskaya Барановская
- Village
- Location within Vologda Oblast Location within Russia
- Coordinates: 59°31′N 36°30′E
- Country: Russia
- Region: Vologda Oblast
- District: Kaduysky District
- Time zone: UTC+3:00

Baranovskaya (Russian: Барановская) is a rural locality (a village) in Semizerye Rural Settlement, Kaduysky District, Vologda Oblast, Russia. The population was 137 as of 2002. There are 3 streets.

== Geography ==
Baranovskaya is located 61 km northwest of Kaduy (the district's administrative centre) by road. Korotnevaya is the nearest rural locality.
