= Sharya (inhabited locality) =

Sharya (Russian: Шарья) is the name of several inhabited localities in Russia.

Urban localities

- Sharya, a town in Kostroma Oblast; 58°23′N 45°31′E
- Sharya (Iraq), a town located in northern Iraq

Rural localities

- Sharya, Chudovsky District, Novgorod Oblast, a village in Gruzinskoye Settlement of Chudovsky District in Novgorod Oblast
- Sharya, Lyubytinsky District, Novgorod Oblast, a village under the administrative jurisdiction of Nebolchskoye Settlement in Lyubytinsky District of Novgorod Oblast
