= Malovishersky District =

Malovishersky District Маловишерский район (Russian)
- District
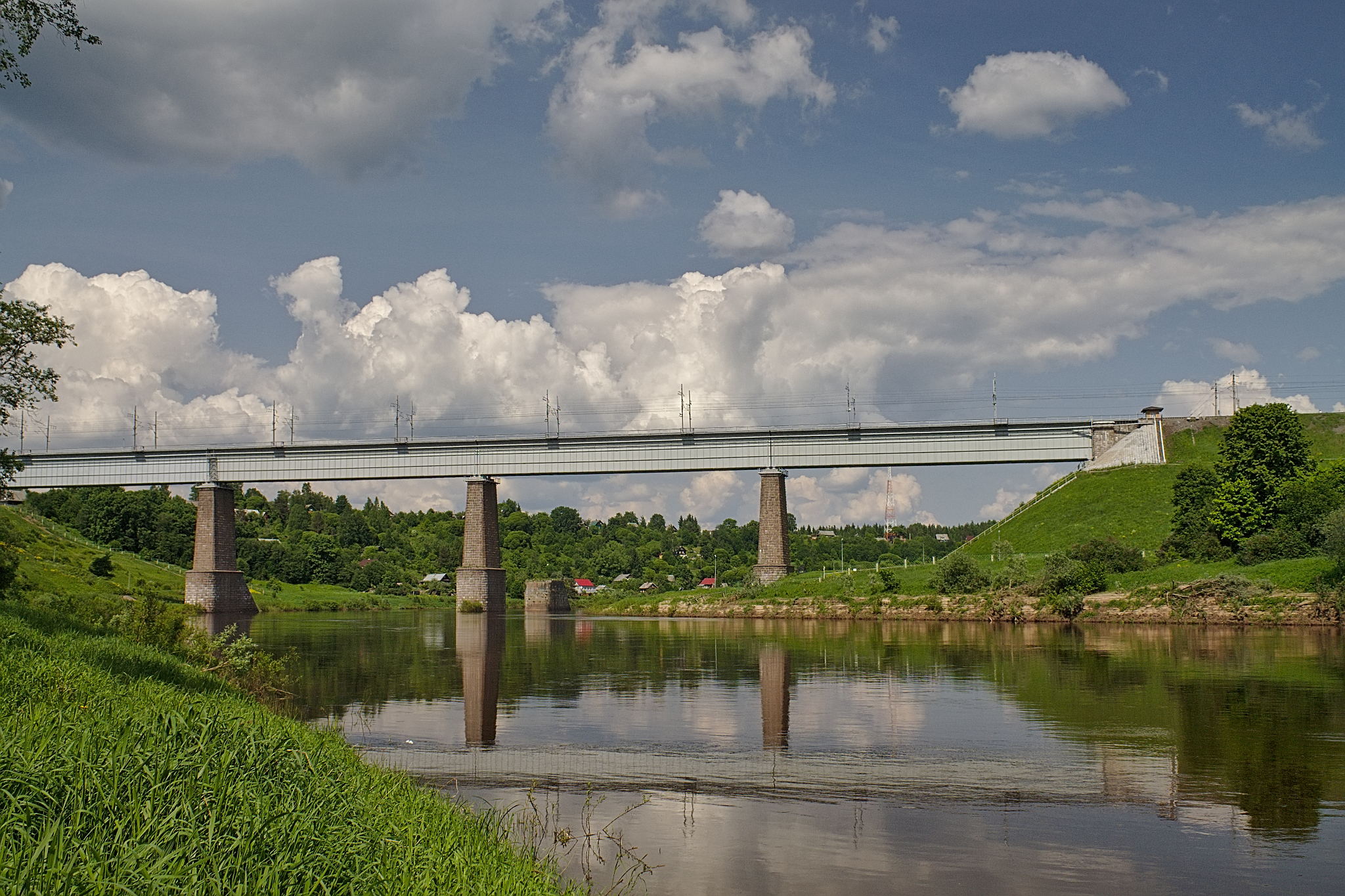
- Msta River bridge, Malovishersky District

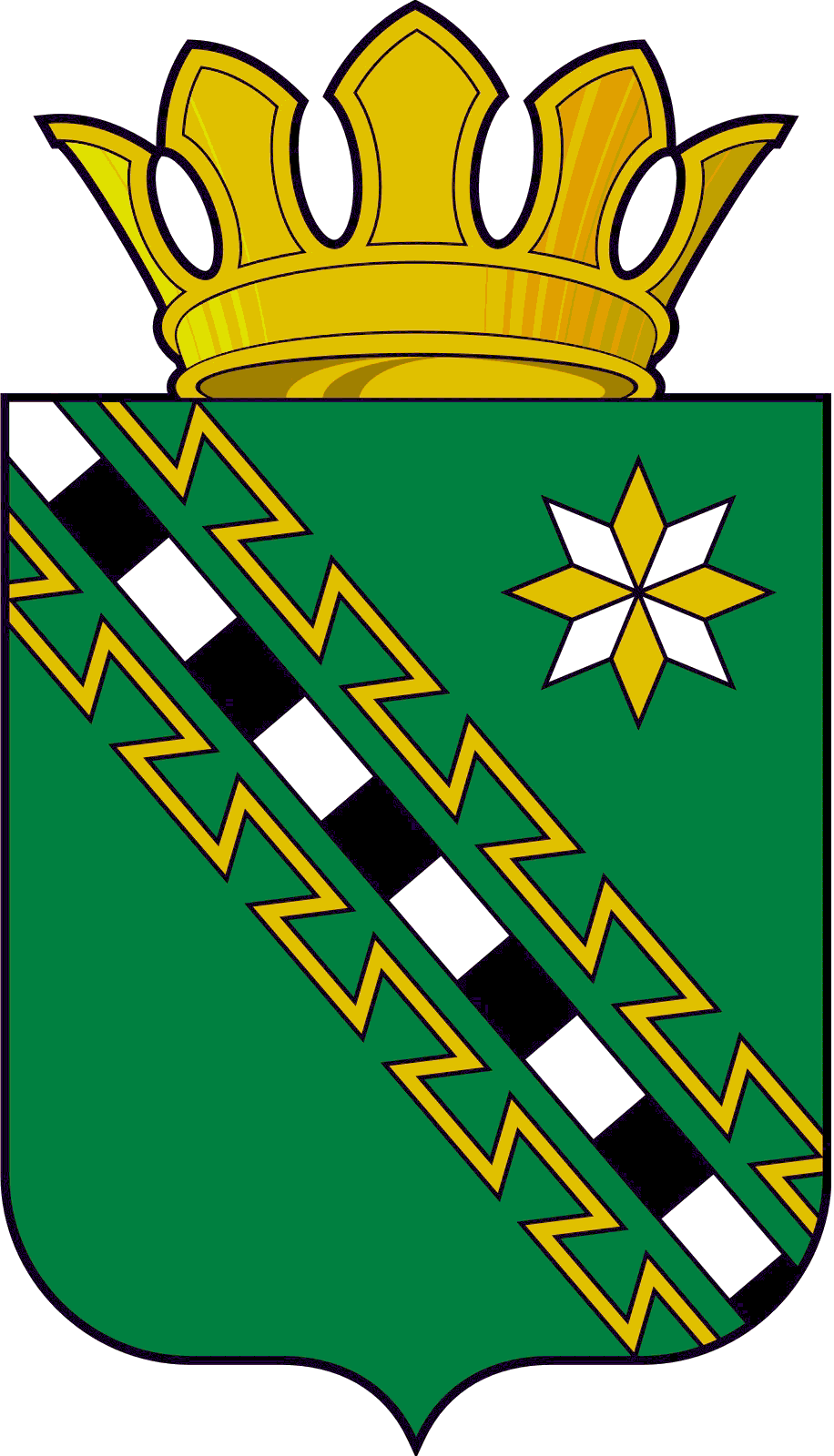
- Flag Coat of arms
- Location of Malovishersky District in Novgorod Oblast
- Coordinates: 58°51′N 32°13′E
- Country: Russia
- Federal subject: Novgorod Oblast
- Established: October 1, 1927
- Administrative center: Malaya Vishera

Area
  - Total: 3,280.98 km^{2} (1,266.79 sq mi)

Population (2010 Census)
  - Total: 17,785
  - Density: 5.4206/km^{2} (14.039/sq mi)
  - Urban: 70.1%
  - Rural: 29.9%

Administrative structure
  - Administrative divisions: 1 Towns of district significance, 3 Settlements
  - Inhabited localities: 1 cities/towns, 131 rural localities

Municipal structure
  - Municipally incorporated as: Malovishersky Municipal District
  - Municipal divisions: 2 urban settlements, 2 rural settlements
- Time zone: UTC+3 (MSK)
- OKTMO ID: 49620000
- Website: http://www.mvadm.ru/

Malovishersky District (Russian: Малови́шерский райо́н) is an administrative and municipal district (raion), one of the twenty-one in Novgorod Oblast, Russia. It is located in the north of the oblast and borders with Kirishsky District of Leningrad Oblast in the north, Lyubytinsky District in the east, Okulovsky District in the southeast, Krestetsky District in the south, Novgorodsky District in the west, and with Chudovsky District in the northwest. The area of the district is 3,280.98 square kilometers (1,266.79 sq mi). Its administrative center is the town of Malaya Vishera. Population: 17,785 (2010 census); 21,713 (2002 Census); 25,167 (1989 Soviet census). The population of Malaya Vishera accounts for 70.1% of the district's total population.

== Geography ==
The district is located in the Valdai Hills and belongs to the basin of the Volkhov River. The rivers in the north of the district drain into the Oskuya River, a right tributary of the Volkhov. The Msta River, a major tributary of Lake Ilmen, crosses the southern part of the district. The rivers in the center and in the south of the district drain into the Msta. The western part of the district lies in the basin of the Vishera River, also a left tributary of the Volkhov. The Bolshaya Vishera River and the Malaya Vishera River form together the Vishera at the western border of the district.

== History ==
The Msta River was an important waterway since at least the 10th century, since it connected Novgorod with the basins of the Volga and the Northern Dvina. In the course of the administrative reform carried out in 1708 by Peter the Great, the area was included into Ingermanland Governorate (known since 1710 as Saint Petersburg Governorate). In 1727, separate Novgorod Governorate was split off. In 1776, the area was transferred to Novgorod Viceroyalty. In 1796, the viceroyalty was abolished, and the area was transferred to Novgorod Governorate.

The development of the area was considerably accelerated after the construction of the Moscow – Saint Petersburg Railway in 1851. In particular, Malaya Vishera was founded as a settlement serving the railway station, and eventually developed into a regional trading center. In 1918, Malaya Vishera was granted town status.

The territory of the modern district was then a part of Krestetsky Uyezd of Novgorod Governorate. In 1920, Malovishersky Uyezd was established, and in 1922, Krestetsky Uyezd was abolished and split between Malovishersky, Valdaysky, and Novgorodsky Uyezds.

In August 1927, the governorates and uyezds were abolished. Malovishersky District, with the administrative center in the town of Malaya Vishera, was established within Novgorod Okrug of Leningrad Oblast effective October 1, 1927. It included parts of former Malovishersky Uyezd (other parts of that uyezd were transferred to Chudovsky and Okulovsky Districts). On July 23, 1930, the okrugs were abolished, and the districts were directly subordinated to the oblast. During World War II, between October 23 and December 22, 1941, parts of Malovishersky District, including the town of Malaya Vishera, were occupied by German troops. On July 5, 1944, Malovishersky District was transferred to newly established Novgorod Oblast, where it remained ever since. On February 1, 1963, the district was transformed into Malovishersky Industrial District in the course of the Nikita Khrushchev's administrative reform, with its rural territory merged into Okulovsky and Novgorodsky Rural Districts. On January 12, 1965, Malovishersky District was re-established.

== Economy ==
=== Industry ===
In the past, the economy of Malaya Vishera was dependent on the glass-making factory, and the factory was experiencing serious difficulties in the 1990s and the first decade of the 2000s. Currently, the economy of the district relies on timber industry (including production of furniture), food industry, and production of instruments. There is also peat production.

=== Agriculture ===
As of 2011, sixteen farms (including four collective farms and twelve individual farms) were involved in agriculture, breeding cattle, growing potatoes and vegetables.

=== Transportation ===
The Moscow – Saint Petersburg Railway crosses the district from south to north. This was the first long-distance railway constructed in Russia, opened in 1851, and built in a straight line. The main railway station in the district is Malaya Vishera, which is a terminal station for suburban trains from Okulovka, Volkhovstroy, and St. Petersburg.

The district has a developed road network. In particular, Malaya Vishera is connected by roads with the M10 highway and with Lyubytino.

The Msta is listed as navigable downstream from the selo of Mstinsky Most. However, there is no navigation on the Msta within the limits of the district.

== Culture and recreation ==
The district contains 2 cultural heritage monuments of federal significance and additionally 118 objects classified as cultural and historical heritage of local significance. Both federal monuments are archaeological sites.

The only museum in the district is the Malaya Vishera District Museum, located in Malaya Vishera. The museum exhibits collections of local interest.
