= Kirishsky =

Kirishsky (masculine), Kirishskaya (feminine), or Kirishskoye (neuter) may refer to:

- Kirishsky District, a district of Leningrad Oblast, Russia
- Kirishskoye Urban Settlement, a municipal formation corresponding to Kirishskoye Settlement Municipal Formation, an administrative division of Kirishsky District of Leningrad Oblast, Russia
