= Porkhovo =

Porkhovo (Russian: Порхово) is the name of several rural localities in Russia:

- Porkhovo, Leningrad Oblast, a village under the administrative jurisdiction of Kingiseppskoye Settlement Municipal Formation in Kingiseppsky District of Leningrad Oblast
- Porkhovo, Novgorod Oblast, a village under the administrative jurisdiction of the Settlement of Nebolchskoye in Lyubytinsky District of Novgorod Oblast
