= Pchyovzha =

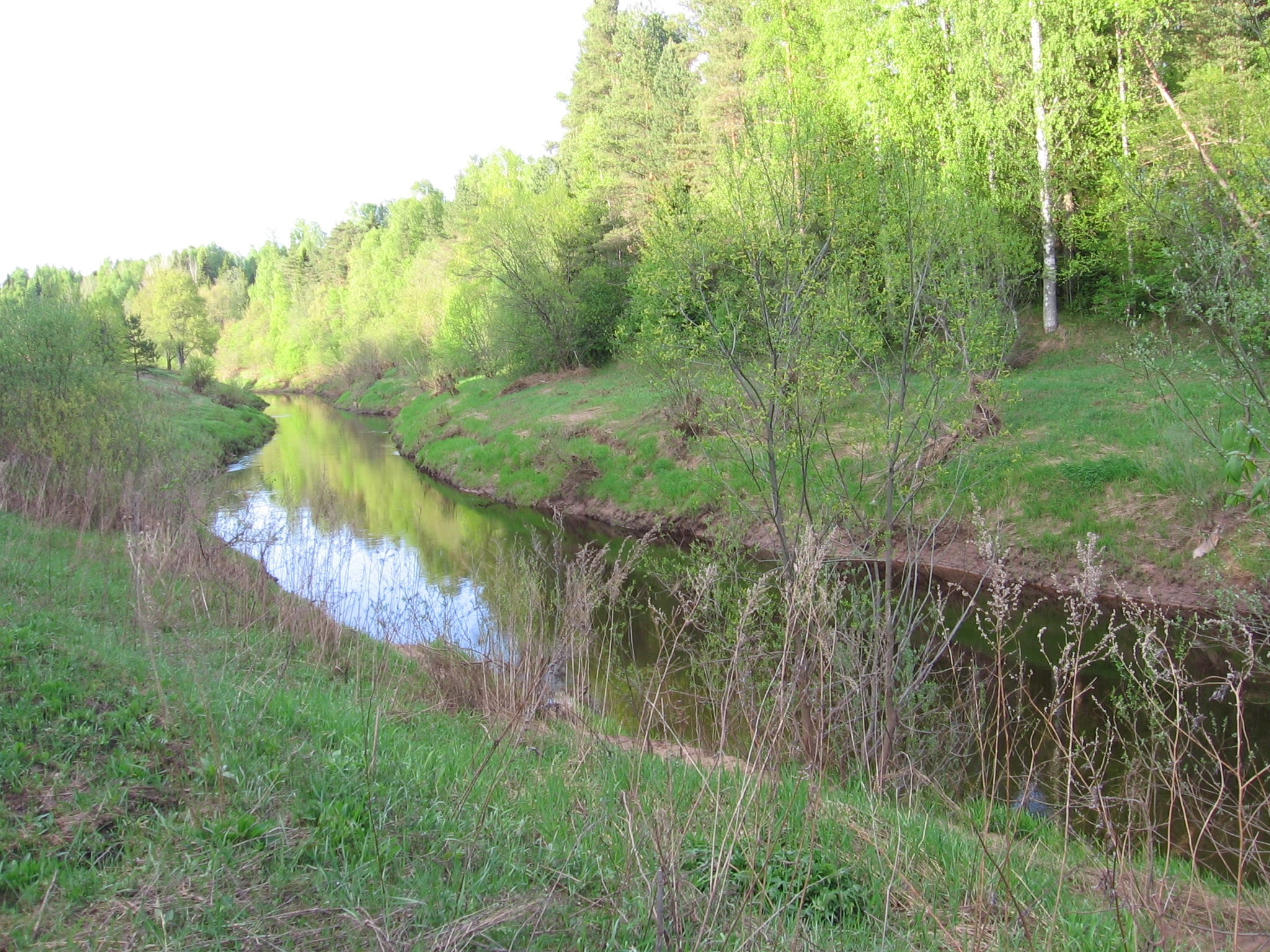
- The Pchyovzha close to Budogoshch
- Native name: Пчёвжа (Russian)

Location
- Country: Russia

Physical characteristics
- Mouth: Volkhov
  - coordinates: 59°21′17″N 31°53′27″E
- Length: 157 km (98 mi)
- Basin size: 1,970 km^{2} (760 sq mi)
- Discharge
  - average: 12.2 m^{3}/s (430 cu ft/s)

Basin features
- Progression: Volkhov→ Lake Ladoga→ Neva→ Gulf of Finland

The Pchyovzha (Russian: Пчёвжа) is a river in Lyubytinsky and Chudovsky Districts of Novgorod Oblast and in Kirishsky District of Leningrad Oblast in Russia. It is a right tributary of the Volkhov. It is 157 kilometres (98 mi) long, and the area of its basin 1,970 square kilometres (760 sq mi). The main tributary of the Pchyovzha is the Raplya (right). The urban-type settlement of Budogoshch is located on the banks of the Pchyovzha.

The source of the Pchyovzha is located in the western part of Lyubytinsky District, southwest of the settlement of Nebolchi. The river flows north. Downstream from the village of Petrovskoye, it accepts the Raplya from the right, turns west and enters Leningrad Oblast. Upstream from Budogoshch it is dammed and forms a reservoir. Downstream from Budogoshch the Pchyovzha reenters Novgorod Oblast. The mouth of the Pchyovzha is close to the village of Melekhovskaya, almost at the border between Novgorod and Leningrad Oblasts.

The river basin of the Pchyovzha comprises the western part of Lyubytinsky District, the north of Chudovsky District, the southwestern part of Kirishsky District, as well as some areas in the southern part of Boksitogorsky District of Leningrad Oblast.
