= Lyubytinsky District =

Lyubytinsky District Любытинский район (Russian)
- District
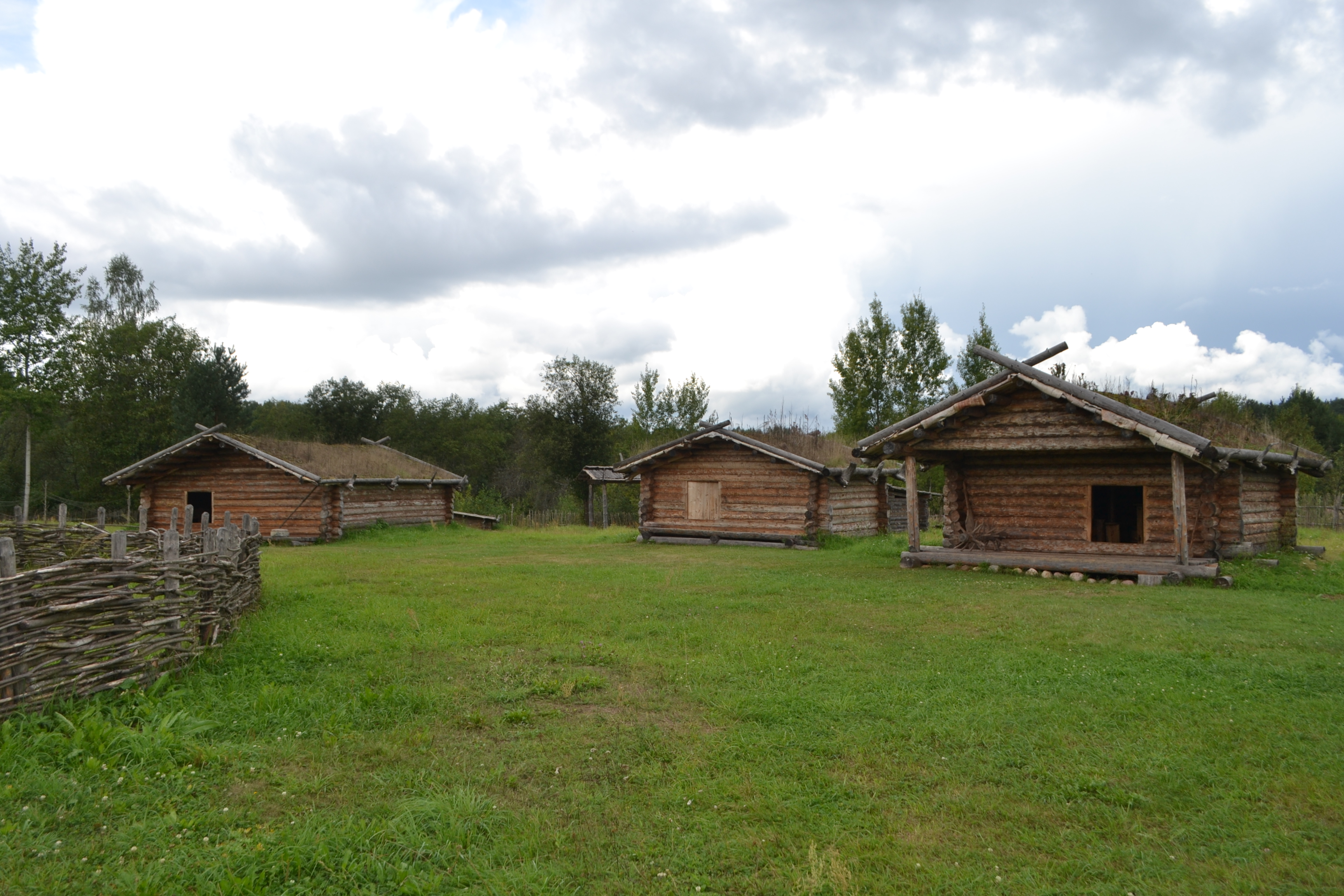
- Recreation of ancient Slavic village, Lyubtinsky District

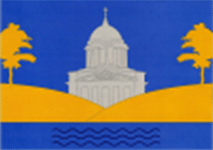
- Flag Coat of arms
- Location of Lyubytinsky District in Novgorod Oblast
- Coordinates: 58°49′N 33°23′E
- Country: Russia
- Federal subject: Novgorod Oblast
- Established: October 1, 1927
- Administrative center: Lyubytino

Area
  - Total: 4,500 km^{2} (1,700 sq mi)

Population (2010 Census)
  - Total: 9,744
  - Density: 2.2/km^{2} (5.6/sq mi)
  - Urban: 49.6%
  - Rural: 50.4%

Administrative structure
  - Administrative divisions: 2 Urban-type settlements
  - Inhabited localities: 2 urban-type settlements, 269 rural localities

Municipal structure
  - Municipally incorporated as: Lyubytinsky Municipal District
  - Municipal divisions: 0 urban settlements, 2 rural settlements
- Time zone: UTC+3 (MSK)
- OKTMO ID: 49616000
- Website: http://lubytino.ru/

Lyubytinsky District (Russian: Любытинский райо́н) is an administrative and municipal district (raion), one of the twenty-one in Novgorod Oblast, Russia. It is located in the northeast of the oblast and borders with Tikhvinsky District of Leningrad Oblast in the north, Boksitogorsky District of Leningrad Oblast in the northeast, Khvoyninsky District in the east, Borovichsky District in the southeast, Okulovsky District in the southwest, Malovishersky District in the west, and with Kirishsky District of Leningrad Oblast in the northwest. The area of the district is 4,500 square kilometers (1,700 sq mi). Its administrative center is the urban locality (a work settlement) of Lyubytino. Population: 9,744 (2010 census); 12,432 (2002 Census); 15,263 (1989 Soviet census). The population of Lyubytino accounts for 28.8% of the district's total population.

== Geography ==
The district is split between several drainage basins. The rivers in the northwestern part drain into the Pchyozhva and Oskuya Rivers, left tributaries of the Volkhov. The north of the district lies in the basins of the Syas River and its right tributary, the Volozhba. The center and the south belong to the basin of the Msta River, which crosses the southern part of the district. The principal tributary of the Msta within the district is the Mda, which crosses the whole district from south to north, makes a U-turn near Nebolchi, flows south, and joins the Msta from the right. The rivers in the eastern areas of the district drain into the Pes River. Since the Pes belongs to the basin of the Volga, and the Syas, the Pchyovzha, and the Msta all belong to the basin of the Neva, the district is crossed by the divide between the basins of the Atlantic Ocean and the Caspian Sea.

There are many lakes in the eastern part of the district, the biggest of which are Lakes Nikulinskoye, Ostrovito, and Omsha. These lakes are of the karst origin. Part of the area is protected as the Karst Lakes Zakaznik.

Much of the area of the district represents the hilly landscape crossed by deep ravines. The northern part of the district belongs to the Tikhvin Ridge, which runs from west to east along the borders of Novgorod and Leningrad Oblasts.

== History ==
The Msta River was an important waterway connecting Novgorod to the lands in the north, at least from the 9th century. Chronicles mention that Olga of Kiev traveled up the Msta River in 947 and founded a pogost which is believed to have been located close to the current location of Lyubytino. The area eventually fell under the control of the Novgorod Republic, and in the 15th century, after the fall of Novgorod, it was annexed by the Grand Duchy of Moscow. In the 16th and the 17th centuries, the region was attractive to monks looking for solitude. In particular, the Ryokonsky Monastery was founded in 1680.

In the course of the administrative reform carried out in 1708 by Peter the Great, the area was included into Ingermanland Governorate (known since 1710 as Saint Petersburg Governorate). In 1727, separate Novgorod Governorate was split off. In 1776, the area was transferred to Novgorod Viceroyalty. In 1796, the viceroyalty was abolished, and the area, which was a part of Borovichsky Uyezd, was transferred to Novgorod Governorate.

In August 1927, the governorates and uyezds were abolished. Belsky District, with the administrative center in the selo of Beloye, was established within Borovichi Okrug of Leningrad Oblast effective October 1, 1927. It included a part of former Borovichsky Uyezd and a minor part of former Malovishersky Uyezd. On July 23, 1930, the okrugs were abolished, and the districts were directly subordinated to the oblast. On March 11, 1931, the administrative center of the district was renamed Lyubytino and the district itself was renamed Lyubytinsky. On July 5, 1944, Lyubytinsky District was transferred to newly established Novgorod Oblast, where it remained ever since, with a brief interruption in 1963–1964. On February 1, 1963, the district was abolished in the course of the Nikita Khrushchev's administrative reform and split between Borovichsky District and the territory of the town of Borovichi. On February 14, 1964, Lyubytinsky Rural District was established from parts of Borovichsky and Pestovsky Rural Districts. On January 12, 1965, Lyubytinsky Rural District was transformed into a regular district.

=== Abolished districts ===
Effective October 1, 1927, Zhukovsky District with the administrative center in the selo of Zhukovo was established, as a part of Leningrad Okrug of Leningrad Oblast. It incorporated lands which formerly belonged to Tikhvinsky Uyezd of Cherepovets Governorate. On March 11, 1931, Zhukovsky District was renamed Dregelsky and Zhukovo was renamed Degli. On June 20, 1933, the administrative center of the district was transferred to Nebolchi. Dregelsky District was partially occupied by German forces between October 31 and December 8, 1941. In 1944, the district was transferred to Novgorod Oblast. On February 1, 1963, Dregelsky District was abolished and merged into Pestovsky Rural District. After a number of reforms, on February 14, 1964 the territory of former Dregelsky District (then a part of Pestovsky Rural District) was included into Lyubytinsky District.

In 1927, Budogoshchensky District with the administrative center in the settlement of Budogoshch and Pikalyovsky District with the administrative center in the selo of Pikalyovo were also established as a part of Leningrad Okrug of Leningrad Oblast. In 1932, Budogoshchensky District was abolished and split between Dregelsky and Kirishsky Districts of Leningrad Oblast. In the same year, Pikalyovsky District was abolished and split between Yefimovsky, Tikhvinsky, Khvoyninsky, Kapshinsky, and Dregelsky Districts.

== Economy ==
=== Industry ===
The economy of the district is based on timber industry and food industry. In Lyubytino, there is a factory producing paint.

=== Agrisulture ===
The main agricultural specialization in the district is cattle breeding. It experiences a deep crisis.

=== Transportation ===
The railroad connecting Sonkovo and Mga crosses the district. The principal railway station is Nebolchi. In Nebolchi, another railway branches off south. It connects Nebolchi with Okulovka, which lies on the main line connecting Moscow and St. Petersburg. Lyubytino has a railway station on the line connecting Nebolchi and Okulovka.

Lyubytino is connected by roads via Nebolchi and Boksitogorsk with A113 highway which connects Vologda and St. Petersburg, via Antsiferovo with Khvoynaya, with Borovichi, and via Malaya Vishera with M10 highway which connects Moscow and St. Petersburg. There are also local roads.

None of the rivers are navigable within the limits of the district.

== Culture and recreation ==
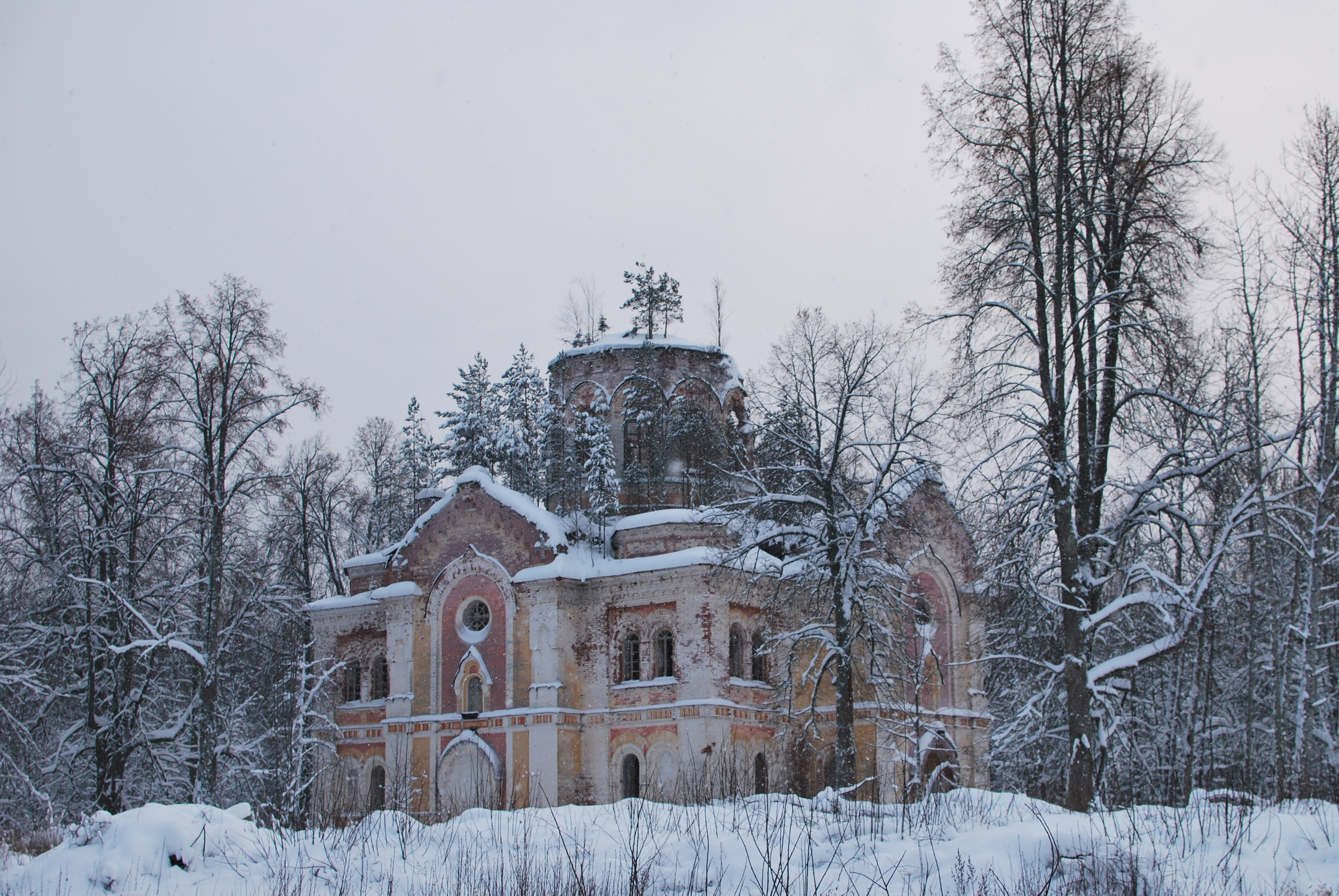
The Trinity Cathedral of the Ryokonsky Monastery

The district contains 7 cultural heritage monuments of federal significance and additionally 153 objects classified as cultural and historical heritage of local significance. Six of the seven federal monuments are archaeological sites, and the seventh one is a house in the settlement of Lyubytino.

There is a local museum in Lyubytino.

A traditional handicraft in the district is making containers and storage boxes of birch bark.
