= Buregi =

Buregi (Russian: Буреги) is the name of several rural localities in Novgorod Oblast, Russia:

- Buregi, Borovichsky District, Novgorod Oblast, a village in Zhelezkovskoye Settlement of Borovichsky District
- Buregi, Chudovsky District, Novgorod Oblast, a village in Tregubovskoye Settlement of Chudovsky District
- Buregi, Starorussky District, Novgorod Oblast, a village in Nagovskoye Settlement of Starorussky District
