= Oskuya =

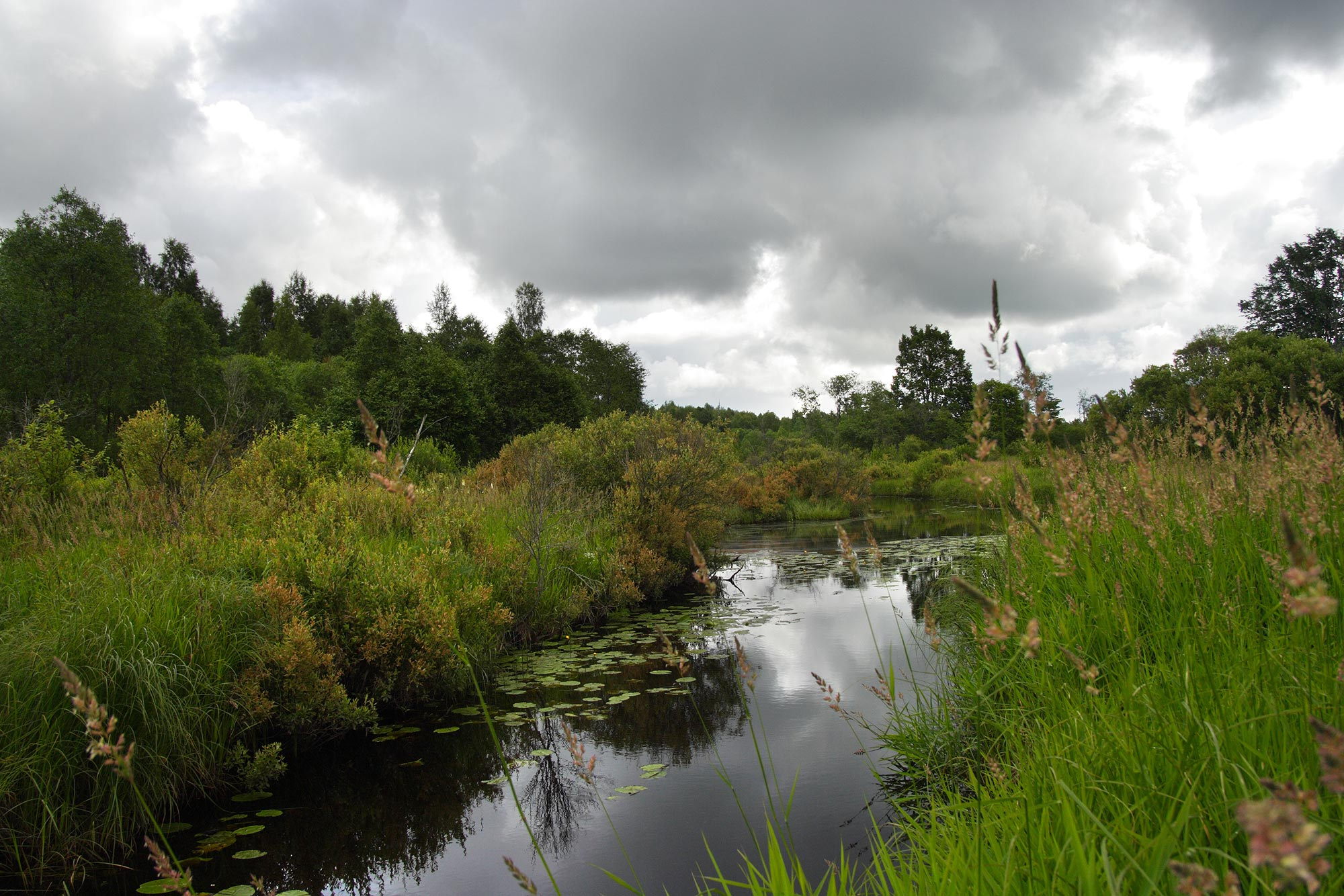
- Native name: Оскуя (Russian)

Location
- Country: Russia

Physical characteristics
- Mouth: Volkhov
  - coordinates: 59°14′07″N 31°53′28″E
- Length: 114 km (71 mi)
- Basin size: 1,470 km^{2} (570 sq mi)

Basin features
- Progression: Volkhov→ Lake Ladoga→ Neva→ Gulf of Finland

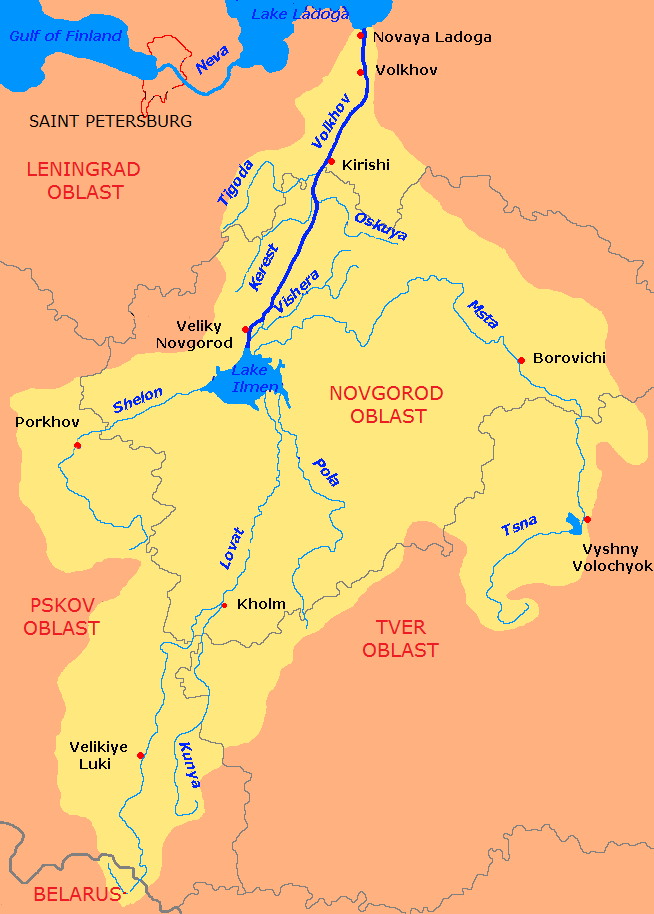
The Volkhov River drainage vasin. The Oskuya is shown on the map.

The Oskuya (Russian: Оскуя) is a river in Lyubytinsky, Malovishersky and Chudovsky Districts of Novgorod Oblast in Russia. It is a right tributary of the Volkhov. It is 114 kilometres (71 mi) long, and the area of its basin 1,470 square kilometres (570 sq mi). The main tributary of the Oskuya is the Sharya (right).

The source of the Oskuya is in the western part of Lyubytinsky District, in a remote area several dozens kilometers west of the settlement of Nebolchi. The river flows west, crosses Malovishersky District, and turns northwest. It accepts the Sharya from the right and in the village of Oskuy sharply turns southwest. The mouth of the Oskuya is located west of the village of Gachevo.

The river basin of the Oskuya comprises areas in the west of Lyubytinsky District, in the northwest of Malovishersky District, in the north of Chudovsky District, as well as in the south of Kirishsky District of Leningrad Oblast.
