= Tikhvinsky Uyezd =

Tikhvinsky Uyezd (Тихвинский уезд) was one of the subdivisions of the Novgorod Governorate of the Russian Empire. It was situated in the northcentral part of the governorate. Its administrative centre was Tikhvin. In terms of present-day administrative borders, the territory of Tikhvinsky Uyezd is divided between the Tikhvinsky, Podporozhsky, Volkhovsky, Boksitogorsky and Kirishsky districts of Leningrad Oblast, the Babayevsky and Chagodoshchensky districts of Vologda Oblast and the Khvoyninsky, Lyubytinsky, Malovishersky and Chudovsky districts of Novgorod Oblast.

== Demographics ==
At the time of the Russian Empire Census of 1897, Tikhvinsky Uyezd had a population of 99,367. Of these, 90.9% spoke Russian, 7.2% Veps, 1.4% Karelian, 0.1% Yiddish, 0.1% Estonian, 0.1% Latvian, 0.1% German and 0.1% Romani as their native language.
