= Budogoshch =

Budogoshch Будогощь
- Urban-type settlement
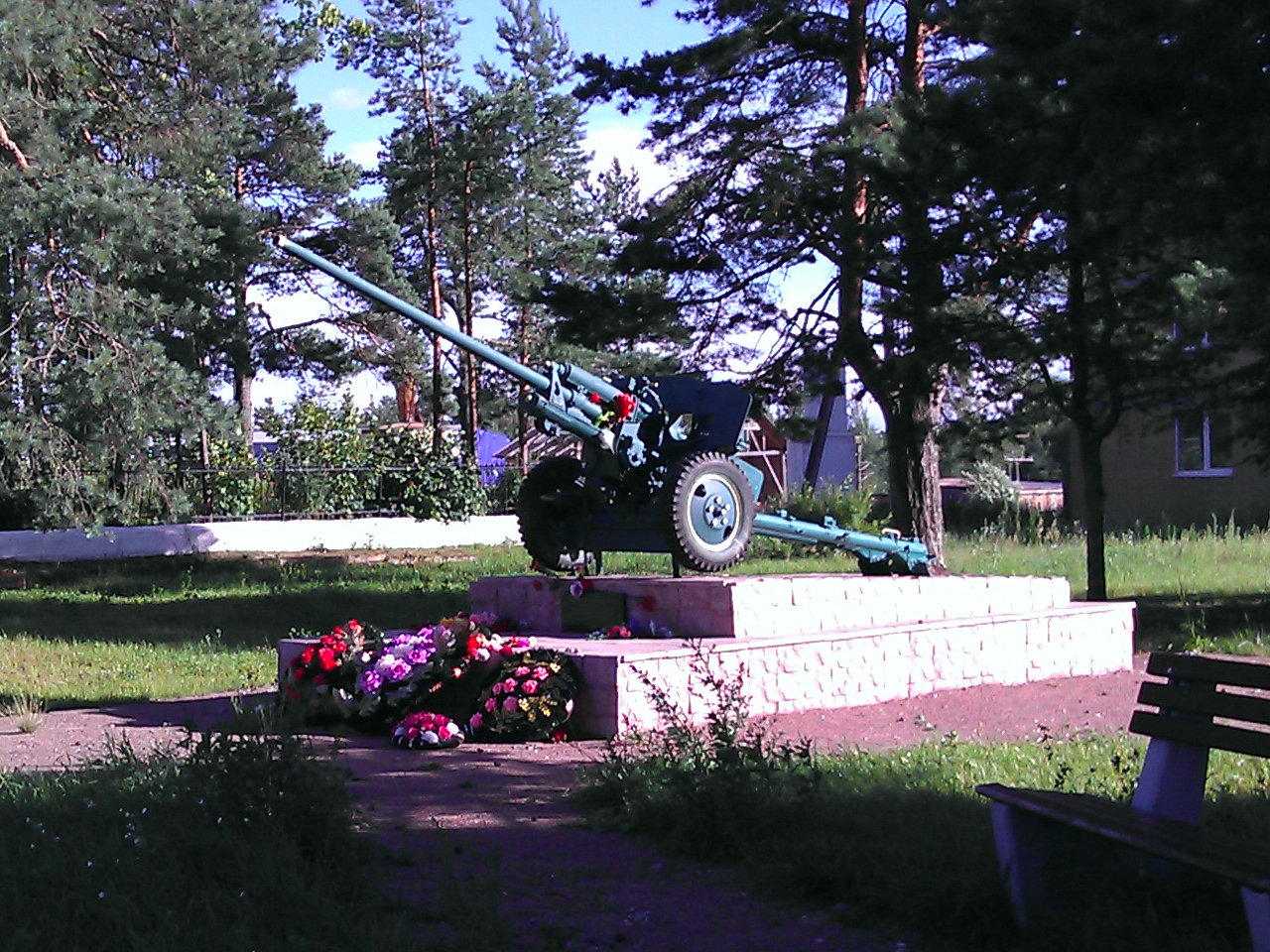
- Interactive map of Budogoshch
- Location of Budogoshch Budogoshch (Leningrad Oblast)
- Coordinates: 59°17′N 32°28′E
- Country: Russia
- Federal subject: Leningrad Oblast
- Administrative district: Kirishsky District
- Founded: 1914

Population (2010 Census)
  - Total: 3,871
  - Estimate (2024): 2,476 (−36%)

Municipal status
  - Municipal district: Kirishsky Municipal District
  - Urban settlement: Budogoshchskoye Urban Settlement
  - Capital of: Budogoshchskoye Urban Settlement
- Time zone: UTC+3 (MSK)
- Postal code: 187120
- OKTMO ID: 41624152051

Budogoshch (Russian: Бу́догощь) is an urban locality (an urban-type settlement) in Kirishsky District of Leningrad Oblast, Russia, located on the banks of the Pchyovzha River. Municipally, it serves as the administrative center of Budogoshskoye Urban Settlement, one of the two urban settlements in the district. Population: 3,871 (2010 census); 3,885 (2002 census); 4,673 (1989 Soviet census).

== History ==
Budogoshch was founded in 1914 as a settlement serving the railway station. The name was taken over from a nearby village which existed presumably from the 17th century. At the time, Budogoshch was part of Tikhvinsky Uyezd of Novgorod Governorate. June 26, 1918, the uyezd was transferred to newly established Cherepovets Governorate. On August 1, 1927 the governorate was abolished, and the area was transferred to Leningrad Oblast. Simultaneously, Budogoshchensky District with the center in Budogoshch was established as part of Leningrad Okrug of Leningrad Oblast. On July 23, 1930 the okrugs were abolished as well, and the districts became directly subordinate to the oblast. In 1932, Budogoshchensky District was abolished and split between Dregelsky and Kirishsky Districts of Leningrad Oblast.

Between October 23 and December 21, 1941, Budogoshch was occupied by German troops. After the liberation, the railroad connecting Budogoshch with Tikhvin, which was restored in 1943, played a key role in providing Leningrad with food and other supplies. Kirishi, which was occupied for two years, was greatly damaged, and in February 1944 the administrative center of Kirishsky District was moved to Budogoshch. On February 1, 1963 the district was abolished and merged into Volkhovsky District, and on January 12, 1965 it was re-established, with Kirishi as the district center.

== Economy ==
=== Industry ===
There are several timber industry enterprises located in Budogoshch.

=== Transportation ===
Budogoshch is connected by roads with Kirishi, Chudovo, Nebolchi, and Tikhvin.

There is a railway station on the railroad connecting Sonkovo and Mga. From Budogoshch, there are direct suburban trains to Saint Petersburg via Mga. Another railway running to Tikhvin branches off northeast. In the 1930s, the railway to Chudovo was constructed and was in operation for cargo traffic, but it was destroyed during the war and never restored.

== Culture ==
The military cemetery in Budogoshch from the Second World War is protected as a cultural heritage monument of local importance.
