= Kirishi-2 Oil Refinery =

Russian oil refinery

- Location within Leningrad Oblast Location within European Russia
- Location: Kirishi, Russia; 59°29′21″N 32°04′38″E

Refinery details
- Owner: Kirishi-2 Oil Refinery
- Opened: January 2017
- Capacity: 10 million tons per year

The Kirishi-2 Oil Refinery is Russia's first residual oil high conversion refinery. It was opened in Kirishi, Russia in 2017. It is located on the site of the KINEF refinery.

== Synopsis ==
The Kirishi-2 Oil Refinery produces a high yield of light oil (73.12%) and high-quality motor fuels. Its products include AI-95 motor gasoline, gas petrochemicals, diesel, kerosene, LPG, isobutene, N-butane, petroleum coke, propane and sulphur.

The Kirishi-2 Oil Refinery has an annual output of 10 million tons. As of 2024 the refinery produced approximately 11 percent of Russia's total output gasoline, 6.4 percent of its diesel fuel, 5.6 percent of fuel oil, and 7.4 percent of its aviation fuel.

The Kirishi-2 refinery is owned by Surgutneftegaz's Kirishinefteorgsintez subsidiary.

== Management ==
The refinery project was managed by Giorgi Ramzaitsev, the chairman of the Board of Directors of ChekSU, a major manganese ore and ferroalloy mining and processing company in Russia, and Andrei Yermolaev, a former member of the Leningrad Regional Legislative Assembly.

== History ==
On 12 March 2024 the refinery was attacked by Ukrainian drones. Reuters reported that at least half of the refinery's production was halted by the attack.

On 4 October 2025, the Kirishi-2 Oil Refinery was attacked by Ukrainian drones sparking a fire. According to the local Governor Aleksandr Drozdenko seven drones were shot down and the fire extinguished. However videos posted by Astra showed four explosions occurring at the facility.

== See also ==
- List of oil refineries
- Petroleum industry in Russia
