= Kirishsky District =

Kirishsky District Киришский район (Russian)
- District
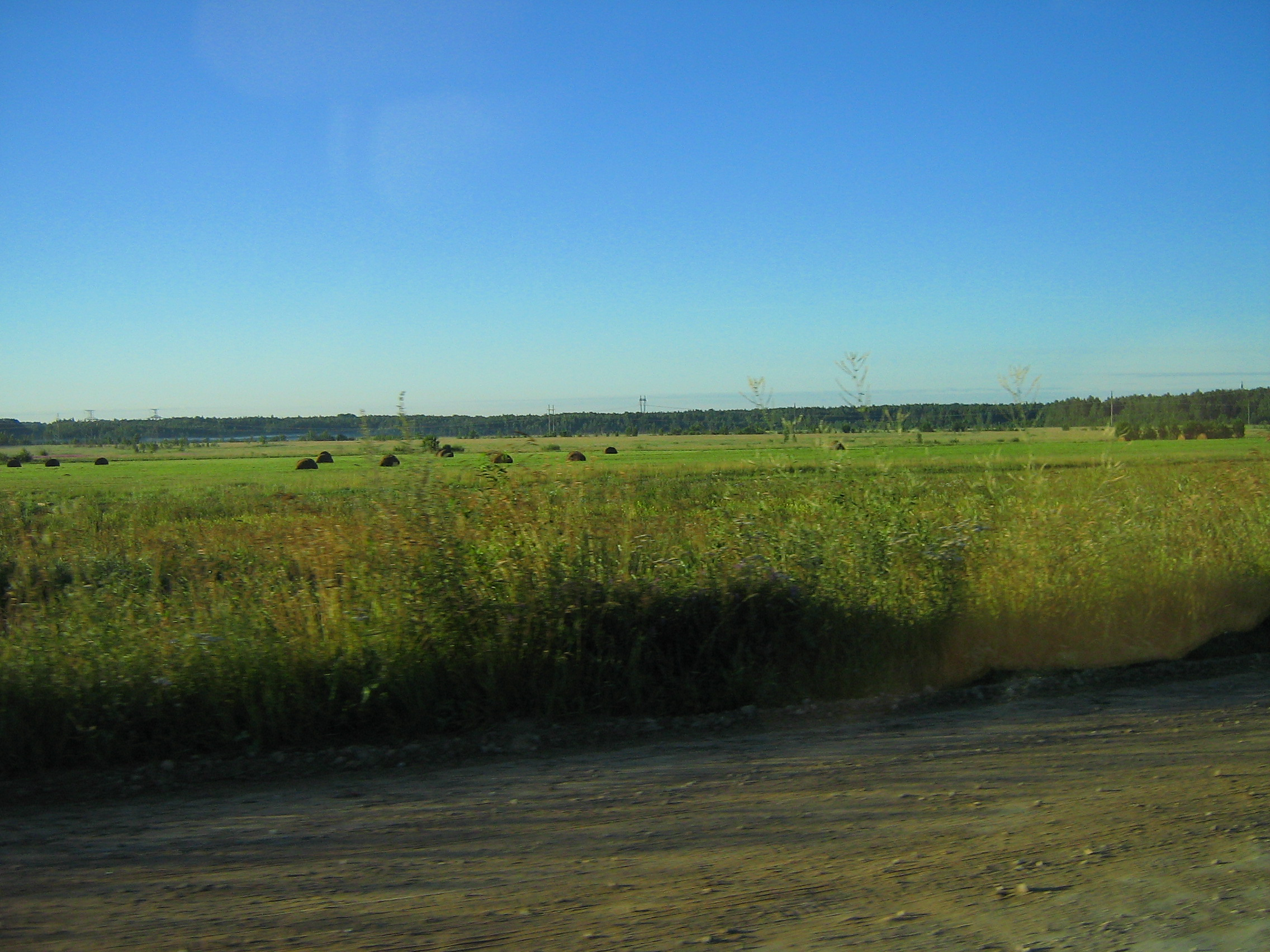
- Farm field in Kirishsky District

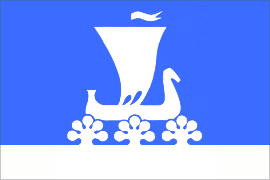
- Flag Coat of arms
- Location of Kirishsky District in Leningrad Oblast
- Coordinates: 59°27′19″N 32°02′11″E
- Country: Russia
- Federal subject: Leningrad Oblast
- Established: 1 August 1927
- Administrative center: Kirishi

Area
  - Total: 3,019.3 km^{2} (1,165.8 sq mi)

Population (2010 Census)
  - Total: 11,455
  - Density: 3.7939/km^{2} (9.8262/sq mi)
  - Urban: 33.8%
  - Rural: 66.2%

Administrative structure
  - Administrative divisions: 4 settlement municipal formation
  - Inhabited localities: 1 cities/towns, 1 urban-type settlements, 75 rural localities

Municipal structure
  - Municipally incorporated as: Kirishsky Municipal District
  - Municipal divisions: 2 urban settlements, 4 rural settlements
- Time zone: UTC+3 (MSK)
- OKTMO ID: 41624000
- Website: http://www.admkir.ru/

Kirishsky District (Russian: Ки́ришский райо́н) is an administrative and municipal district (raion), one of the seventeen in Leningrad Oblast, Russia. It is located in the central southern part of the oblast and borders with Volkhovsky District in the north, Tikhvinsky District in the northeast, Lyubytinsky District of Novgorod Oblast in the southeast, Malovishersky District of Novgorod Oblast in the south, Chudovsky District of Novgorod Oblast in the southwest, Tosnensky District in the west, and Kirovsky District in the northwest. The area of the district is 3,019.3 square kilometers (1,165.8 sq mi). Its administrative center is the town of Kirishi. Population (excluding the administrative center): 11,455 (2010 census); 12,075 (2002 Census); 14,521 (1989 Soviet census).

== Geography ==
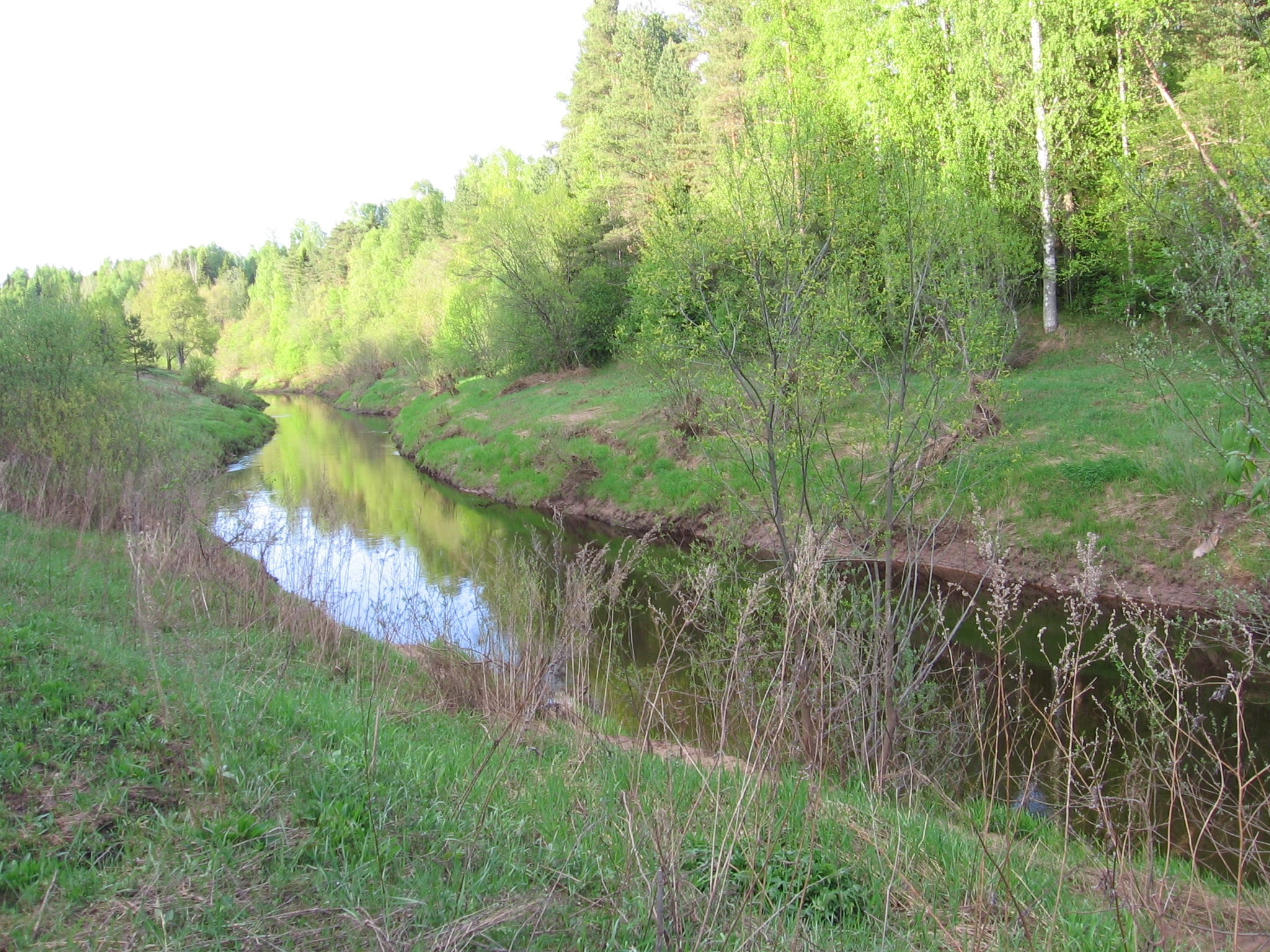
The Pchyovzha River in the district

Kirishsky District is elongated from northwest to southeast, and almost the whole area of the district belongs to the drainage basin of the Volkhov River. The Volkhov crosses the district from south to north, with its biggest tributaries within the district being the Pchyovzha River (right) and the Tigoda River (left). Minor areas in the east of the district belong to the basin of the Syas River. The forests occupy two thirds of the area of the district, with swamps occupying further 13%. By far the most common tree is spruce.

== History ==
The Volkhov River in the medieval times served as a part of the trade route from the Varangians to the Greeks. The area was a part of Novgorod Lands, subsequently of the Novgorod Republic. After the fall of the republic, it was, together will all Novgorod Lands, annexed by the Grand Duchy of Moscow. The area was included into Obozerskaya Pyatina, one of the pyatinas which Novgorod Lands were divided into. Kirishi was first mentioned in chronicles in 1693.

In the course of the administrative reform carried out in 1708 by Peter the Great, the area was included into Ingermanland Governorate (known since 1710 as Saint Petersburg Governorate) as Ladozhsky Uyezd with the center in Staraya Ladoga. In 1727, separate Novgorod Governorate was split off, and the uyezd was transformed into Novoladozhsky Uyezd, and the administrative center was moved to Novaya Ladoga. In 1776, the area was transferred to Novgorod Viceroyalty, and in 1781, it was moved back into Saint Petersburg Governorate. On December 9, 1922, the administrative center of the uyezd was moved to the selo of Gostinopolye, which was renamed Volkhov and was granted town status. The uyezd was renamed Volkhovsky. In 1924 the changes were rolled back, the administrative center moved to Novaya Ladoga, and Volkhov was demoted to a selo (eventually renamed Gostinopolye). The name of the uyezd remained Volkhovsky. Saint Petersburg Governorate was twice renamed, to Petrograd Governorate and subsequently to Leningrad Governorate.

On August 1, 1927, the uyezds were abolished and Andreyevsky District, with the administrative center in the selo of Andreyevo, was established. The governorates were also abolished, and the district was a part of Leningrad Okrug of Leningrad Oblast. It included parts of former Volkhovsky Uyezd. On July 23, 1930, the okrugs were abolished as well, and the districts were directly subordinated to the oblast. On September 30, 1931, the administrative center of the district was moved to the selo of Kirishi, which was formerly known as Soltsy, and the district was renamed Kirishsky. On December 27, 1933, Kirishi was granted urban-type settlement status. Between October 1941 and January 1944, during World War II, the district were occupied by German troops. Kirishi, which was occupied for two years, was greatly damaged, and in February 1944 the administrative center of the district was moved to the urban-type settlement of Budogoshch. On February 1, 1963, the district was abolished and merged into Volkhovsky District, and on January 12, 1965, it was re-established. Kirishi was granted town status and made the administrative center of the district. On January 26, 1967, Kirishi was made a town of oblast significance. In 2010, the administrative division of Leningrad Oblast was harmonized with the municipal division, and Kirishi was made a town of district significance.

On August 1, 1927, Budogoshchensky District with the administrative center in the urban-type settlement of Budogoshch was established as well as part of Leningrad Okrug of Leningrad Oblast. On January 1, 1932, Budogoshchensky District was abolished and split between Dregelsky and Kirishsky Districts.

== Economy ==
=== Industry ===
There are several oil refineries and chemical industry enterprises, all located in the town of Kirishi. The biggest of them is Kinef. As of 2012, industry was responsible for the 88% GDP produced in the district. Kirishi Power Station, a thermal power station, is located in the town of Kirishi as well.

=== Agriculture ===
Agricultural lands occupy 17% of the district and are located in the valleys of the Volkhov, the Pchyovzha, and the Sharya, a tributary of the Oskuya. The main agricultural specializations in the district are milk and vegetables production.

=== Transportation ===
The railroad connecting Sonkovo and Mga crosses the district. The principal railway stations are Kirishi and Budogoshch. In Kirishi, another railway branches off north. It connects Kirishi with Tikhvin, which lies on the line connecting St. Petersburg and Vologda via Cherepovets.

Kirishi is connected by road with Volkhov and Chudovo. There are also local roads.

The Volkhov River is navigable within the district, however, there is no passenger navigation.

== Culture and recreation ==
The district contains thirty-two objects classified as cultural and historical heritage of local significance. Most of them commemorate the events of World War II.

The only museum in the district is the Kirishsky District Museum, located in Kirishi.
