= Kirishi =

Town in Leningrad Oblast, Russia

Kirishi Кириши
- Town
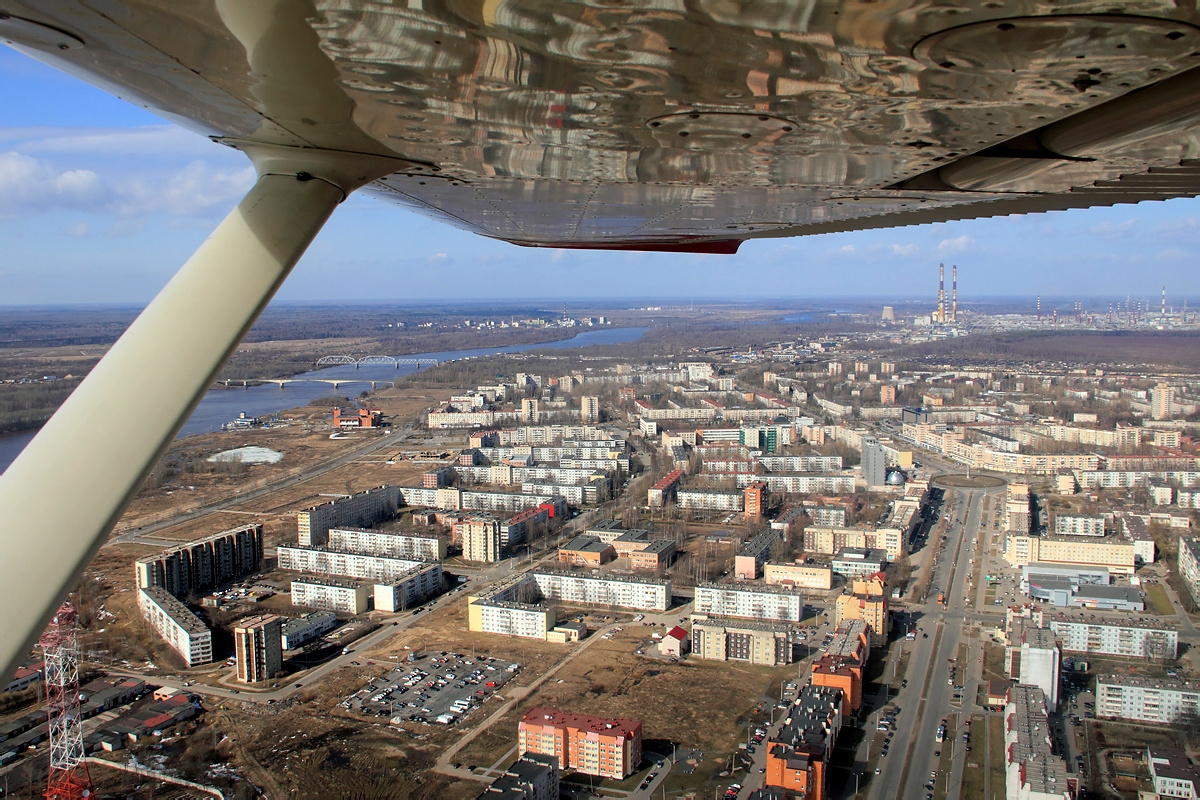

- Flag Coat of arms
- Interactive map of Kirishi
- Location of Kirishi Kirishi (Leningrad Oblast)
- Coordinates: 59°27′N 32°01′E
- Country: Russia
- Federal subject: Leningrad Oblast
- Administrative district: Kirishsky District
- Settlement municipal formationSelsoviet: Kirishskoye Settlement Municipal Formation
- First mentioned: 1693
- Town status since: 1965
- Elevation: 29 m (95 ft)

Population (2010 Census)
  - Total: 52,309
  - Estimate (2025): 49,235 (−5.9%)
  - Rank: 312th in 2010

Administrative status
  - Capital of: Kirishsky District, Kirishkoye Settlement Municipal Formation

Municipal status
  - Municipal district: Kirishsky Municipal District
  - Urban settlement: Kirishskoye Urban Settlement
  - Capital of: Kirishsky Municipal District, Kirishskoye Urban Settlement
- Time zone: UTC+3 (MSK)
- Postal codes: 187110–187115, 187139
- OKTMO ID: 41624101001
- Website: gorod-kirishi.ru

Kirishi (Russian: Ки́риши, IPA: [ˈkʲirʲɪʂɨ]) is a town and the administrative center of Kirishsky District in Leningrad Oblast, Russia, located on the right bank of the Volkhov River, 115 kilometers (71 mi) southeast of St. Petersburg. Population: 52,309 (2010 census); 55,634 (2002 census); 53,014 (1989 Soviet census).

It was previously known as Soltsy (until 1931).

== Etymology ==
The name of the town originates from the Kirisha River (previously known as Kiresha), a tributary of the Volkhov River.

== History ==
It was first mentioned in 1693. Since 1727, it was a part of Novoladozhsky Uyezd of Novgorod Governorate, later of St. Petersburg Governorate. In 1922–1923, the uyezd was renamed Volkhovsky. Before 1931, Kirishi was known as Soltsy.

On August 1, 1927, the uyezds were abolished and Andreyevsky District, with the administrative center in the selo of Andreyevo, was established. The governorates were also abolished and the district became a part of Leningrad Okrug of Leningrad Oblast. Kirishi became a part of Andreyevsky District. On September 30, 1931, the administrative center of the district was moved to Kirishi and the district was renamed Kirishsky. On December 27, 1933 Kirishi was granted urban-type settlement status. Kirishi was occupied for two years during World War II and completely destroyed in 1943, so that on February 19, 1944 the administrative center of the district was moved to the urban-type settlement of Budogoshch.

In 1960, Kirishi was rebuilt and the Kirishi oil refinery was constructed. On February 1, 1963, the district was abolished and merged into Volkhovsky District but on January 12, 1965 it was re-established. Kirishi was granted town status and made the administrative center of the district. On January 26, 1967, Kirishi became a town of oblast significance. In 2010, the administrative structure of Leningrad Oblast was harmonized with its municipal structure, and Kirishi became a town of district significance.

== Administrative and municipal status ==
Within the framework of administrative divisions, Kirishi serves as the administrative center of Kirishsky District. As an administrative division, it is incorporated within Kirishsky District as Kirishskoye Settlement Municipal Formation. As a municipal division, Kirishskoye Settlement Municipal Formation is incorporated within Kirishsky Municipal District as Kirishskoye Urban Settlement.

== Economy ==
In 1974, a "BVK" (belkovo-vitaminny kontsentrat, i.e., "protein-vitamin concentrate") production facility was constructed next to the oil refinery. This was the USSR Ministry of Microbiological Industry's second plant of this kind (after the one in Kstovo, opened in 1973). It used n-paraffins (byproducts of oil refining) as feedstock for yeast, which in its turn produced single-cell protein, used as poultry and cattle feed.

After a 1987 accident at the microbiological plant, local mass protests forced the Supreme Soviet to close down the facility by 1989, as well as its seven sister plants throughout the Soviet Union. The protests had been fueled by local discontent since the early 1980s with the harmful emissions of the four main factories of the town, with the BVK factory being the biggest polluter. Scenes from the protests were featured in the 1989 docuseries Hello Do You Hear Us? (Soviets) by Latvian director Juris Podnieks.

=== Industry ===
There are several oil refineries and chemical industry enterprises. The biggest of them is Kinef. Kirishi Power Station, a thermal power station, is located in Kirishi as well.

Kirishi is also planned to serve as the home of Russia's first residual oil high conversion refinery, the Kirishi-2 Oil Refinery, which is scheduled to open in 2017.

== Transportation ==
The railroad connecting Sonkovo and Mga passes through Kirishi. Another railway branches off north. It connects Kirishi with Tikhvin, which lies on the line connecting St. Petersburg and Vologda via Cherepovets.

Kirishi is connected by road with Volkhov and Chudovo. There are also local roads.

The Volkhov River is navigable in Kirishi; however, there is no passenger navigation.

== Culture and recreation ==
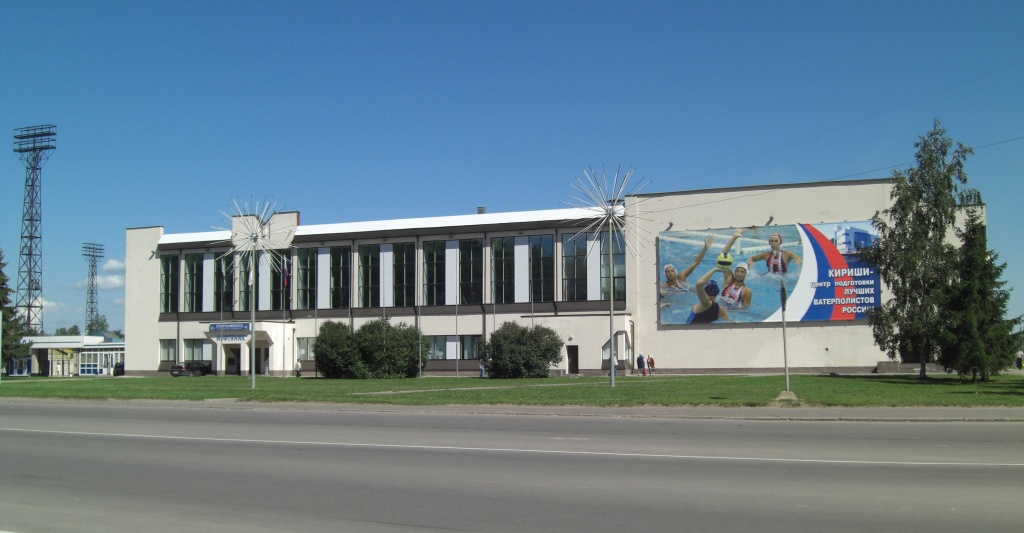
Oilmen's Sports Palace

The district contains seven objects classified as cultural and historical heritage of local significance. All of them commemorate the events of World War II.

Kirishi hosts the Kirishsky District Museum.

== Twin towns and sister cities ==
Kirishi is twinned with:

- Iisalmi, Finland
- Tysfjord, Norway
