= Lyubytino =

Lyubytino Любытино
- Urban-type settlement
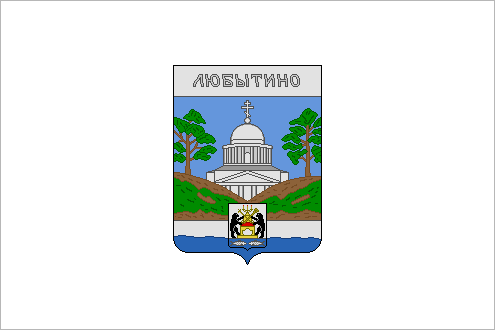
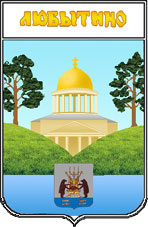
- Flag Coat of arms
- Interactive map of Lyubytino
- Location of Lyubytino Lyubytino (Novgorod Oblast)
- Coordinates: 58°48′40″N 33°23′30″E
- Country: Russia
- Federal subject: Novgorod Oblast
- Administrative district: Lyubytinsky District
- Urban-type settlement status since: 1965

Population (2010 Census)
  - Total: 2,807
  - Estimate (2025): 2,275 (−19%)

Administrative status
  - Capital of: Lyubytinsky District, Lyubytinskoye Settlement

Municipal status
  - Municipal district: Lyubytinsky Municipal District
  - Capital of: Lyubytinsky Municipal District, Lyubytinskoye Urban Settlement
- Time zone: UTC+3 (MSK)
- Postal code: 174760
- OKTMO ID: 49616428051

Lyubytino (Russian: Любы́тино) is an urban locality (a work settlement) and the administrative center of Lyubytinsky District of Novgorod Oblast, Russia, located on the Msta River. Municipally, it serves as the administrative center of Lyubytinskoye Urban Settlement, one of the two urban settlements in the district. Population: 2,807 (2010 census); 3,300 (2002 census); 3,474 (1989 Soviet census).

== History ==
The Msta River was an important waterway connecting Novgorod to the lands in the north, at least from the 9th century. The chronicles mention that Olga of Kiev traveled up the Msta River in 947 and founded a pogost which is believed close to the current location of Lyubytino. Numerous ancient graves with tumuli were raised in Lyubytino and can be still today noticed in the several places around the settlement.

The area eventually went under control of the Novgorod Republic, and in the 15th century, after the fall of Novgorod, it was transferred to the Grand Duchy of Moscow.

In the end of the 19th century, Lyubytino, then known as the selo of Beloye, was the center of Belskaya Volost of Borovichsky Uyezd, Novgorod Governorate. On August 1, 1927, the uyezds were abolished, and Belsky District was established, with the center in Beloye. The district belonged to Borovichi Okrug of Leningrad Oblast. On July 23, 1930, the okrugs were abolished, and the districts became directly subordinate to the oblast. On March 11, 1931, the district center was renamed to Lyubytino, and the district was renamed into Lyubytinsky District. On July 5, 1944, Lyubytinsky District was transferred to newly established Novgorod Oblast and has remained there ever since, with a brief interruption between 1963 and 1965, when the district was abolished as a part of aborted Khrushchyov administrative reform.

On June 23, 1965, Lyubytino acquired a status of an urban-type settlement.

== Economy ==
=== Industry ===
In Lyubytino, there is a factory producing paint, as well as timber industry and food industry enterprises.

=== Transportation ===
In Lyubytino, there is a railway station on the railroad connecting Nebolchi and Okulovka. This minor railroad connects two major branches. Nebolchi is located on the railroad connecting Sonkovo and Mga, whereas Okulovka lies on the main line connecting Moscow and Saint Petersburg.

Lyubytino is connected by roads via Nebolchi and Boksitogorsk with A113 highway which connects Vologda and Saint Petersburg, via Antsiferovo with Khvoynaya, with Borovichi, and via Malaya Vishera with M10 highway which connects Moscow and Saint Petersburg. There are also local roads.

== Culture and recreation ==
The district contains one cultural heritage monument of federal significance and additionally twenty-one objects classified as cultural and historical heritage of local significance. The federal monument is a living house.

There is a local museum in Lyubytino.
