= Chudovsky District =

Chudovsky District Чудовский район (Russian)
- District
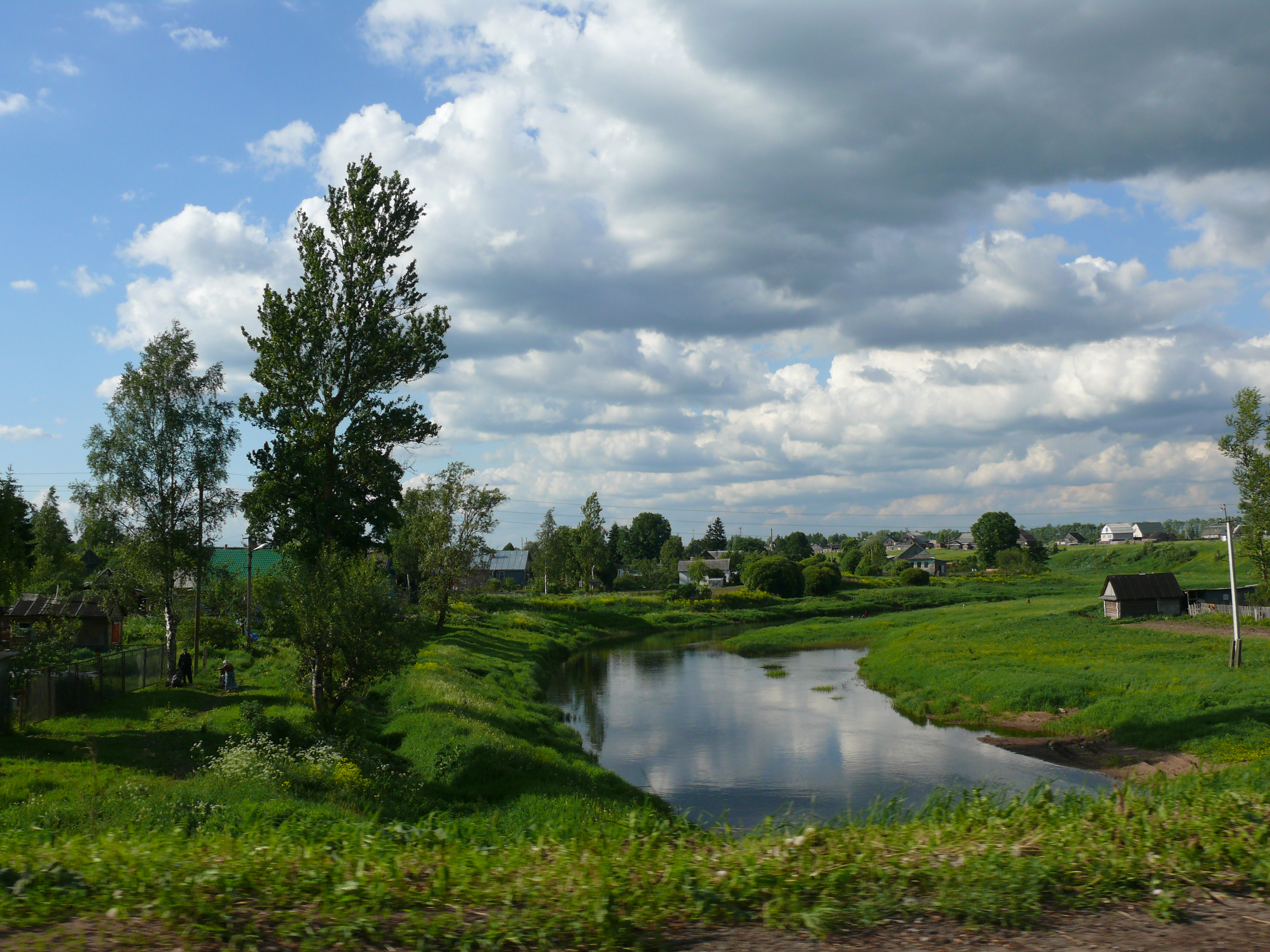
- The Kerest River in the town of Chudovo, Chudovsky District

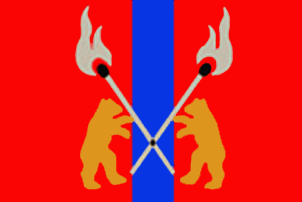
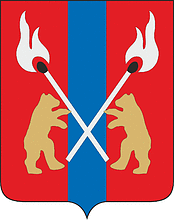
- Flag Coat of arms
- Location of Chudovsky District in Novgorod Oblast
- Coordinates: 59°08′N 31°40′E
- Country: Russia
- Federal subject: Novgorod Oblast
- Established: October 1, 1927
- Administrative center: Chudovo

Area
  - Total: 2,370 km^{2} (920 sq mi)

Population (2010 Census)
  - Total: 22,011
  - Density: 9.29/km^{2} (24.1/sq mi)
  - Urban: 70.0%
  - Rural: 30.0%

Administrative structure
  - Administrative divisions: 1 Towns of district significance, 3 Settlements
  - Inhabited localities: 1 cities/towns, 83 rural localities

Municipal structure
  - Municipally incorporated as: Chudovsky Municipal District
  - Municipal divisions: 1 urban settlements, 3 rural settlements
- Time zone: UTC+3 (MSK)
- OKTMO ID: 49650000
- Website: http://adminchudovo.ru/

Chudovsky District (Russian: Чу́довский райо́н) is an administrative and municipal district (raion), one of the twenty-one in Novgorod Oblast, Russia. It is located in the north of the oblast and borders with Kirishsky District of Leningrad Oblast in the northeast, Malovishersky District in the southeast, Novgorodsky District in the southwest, and with Tosnensky District of Leningrad Oblast in the northwest. The area of the district is 2,370 square kilometers (920 sq mi). Its administrative center is the town of Chudovo. Population: 22,011 (2010 census); 25,829 (2002 Census); 27,355 (1989 Soviet census). The population of Chudovo accounts for 70.0% of the district's total population.

== Geography ==
The district is located in the Ilmen Lowlands and is crossed by the Volkhov River from southwest to northeast, dividing the district into approximately equal areas. The highest point in the district is 63 meters (207 ft) above sea level. All rivers in the district drain into the Volkhov and its main tributaries, including the Oskuya (right), the Pchyozhva (right), the Kerest (left), and the Tigoda (left).

Over 70% of the district's territory is covered by forests. There are also many swamps, which cover 8% of the territory. The biggest one, Bor Swamp, is located in the valley of the Pchyovzha and is protected as a zakaznik.

== History ==
The Volkhov River served as a major waterway, a part of the trade route from the Varangians to the Greeks, since medieval times. Chudovo was first mentioned as a village in 1539. By the 18th century, it developed into a big selo with a postal service station. The development of the district was further aided by the construction of the Moscow – Saint Petersburg Railway, which opened in 1851. The railway to Novgorod was completed in 1871. A match factory, two cement-making factories, and a number of porcelain factories were built later.

In the course of the administrative reform carried out in 1708 by Peter the Great, the area was included into Ingermanland Governorate (known since 1710 as Saint Petersburg Governorate). In 1727, separate Novgorod Governorate was split off. In 1776, the area was transferred to Novgorod Viceroyalty. In 1796, the viceroyalty was abolished and the area was transferred to Novgorod Governorate. In 1917, Chudovo was the administrative center of Chudovskaya Volost of Novgorodsky Uyezd.

In August 1927, the governorates and uyezds were abolished. Chudovsky District, with the administrative center in the settlement of Chudovo, was established within Novgorod Okrug of Leningrad Oblast effective October 1, 1927. It included parts of Novgorodsky and Malovishersky Uyezds of Novgorod Governorate and of Volkhovsky Uyezd of Leningrad Governorate. On June 25, 1928, Chudovo was granted work settlement status. On July 23, 1930, the okrugs were abolished, and the districts were directly subordinated to the oblast. On January 4, 1931, one selsoviet (Alexandrovsky) was granted ethnic German status, and two others (Derevolatyshsky and Kolomovsky) were granted Latvian ethnic status. On July 20, 1937, Chudovo was granted town status. On April 14, 1939, Kolomovsky Latvian Selsoviet was abolished and merged into Chudovsky Selsoviet and Alexandrovsky German Selsoviet was transformed into a regular selsoviet. Derevolatyshsky Latvian Selsoviet was abolished on September 19, 1939 and merged into Rogachyovsky Selsoviet. Between August and November 1941, during World War II, the whole area of the district was occupied by German troops. Whereas the right bank of the Volkhov was liberated by the Soviet Army between December 1941 and February 1942, battles were fought for a long time for the left bank of the Volkhov. The town of Chudovo and the rest of the district were liberated in January and February 1944. On July 5, 1944, Chudovsky District was transferred to newly established Novgorod Oblast, where it remained ever since.

== Economy ==
=== Industry ===
The most developed industries in the district are chemical, food, and timber industries. The former glass-making factory in Chudovo was converted to production of thermo-isolating materials. There are enterprises producing matches, plywood, and railroad ties.

=== Agriculture ===
The main agriculture specializations in the district are cattle breeding (beef and milk production), as well as production of pork, poultry, and eggs.

=== Transportation ===
The Moscow – Saint Petersburg Railway crosses the district from southeast to northwest. Chudovo is the most important railway station, where a railroad to Veliky Novgorod branches off south, and the railway line to Murmansk via Volkhovstroy and Petrozavodsk runs north.

The M10 highway connecting Moscow and St. Petersburg also crosses the district, first following the left bank of the Volkhov River from Novgorod, and in Chudovo turning northwest parallel to the railroad. Roads connect the highway with Malaya Vishera and Chudovo with Budogoshch. Close to the border with Leningrad Oblast, there is a T-shaped intersection with A115 highway, which runs to Volkhov via Kirishi and joins the M18 highway to Petrozavodsk and Murmansk. There are also local roads.

The Volkhov River is navigable for nearly all its length, including in Chudovsky District. However, there is no regular passenger navigation.

== Culture and recreation ==
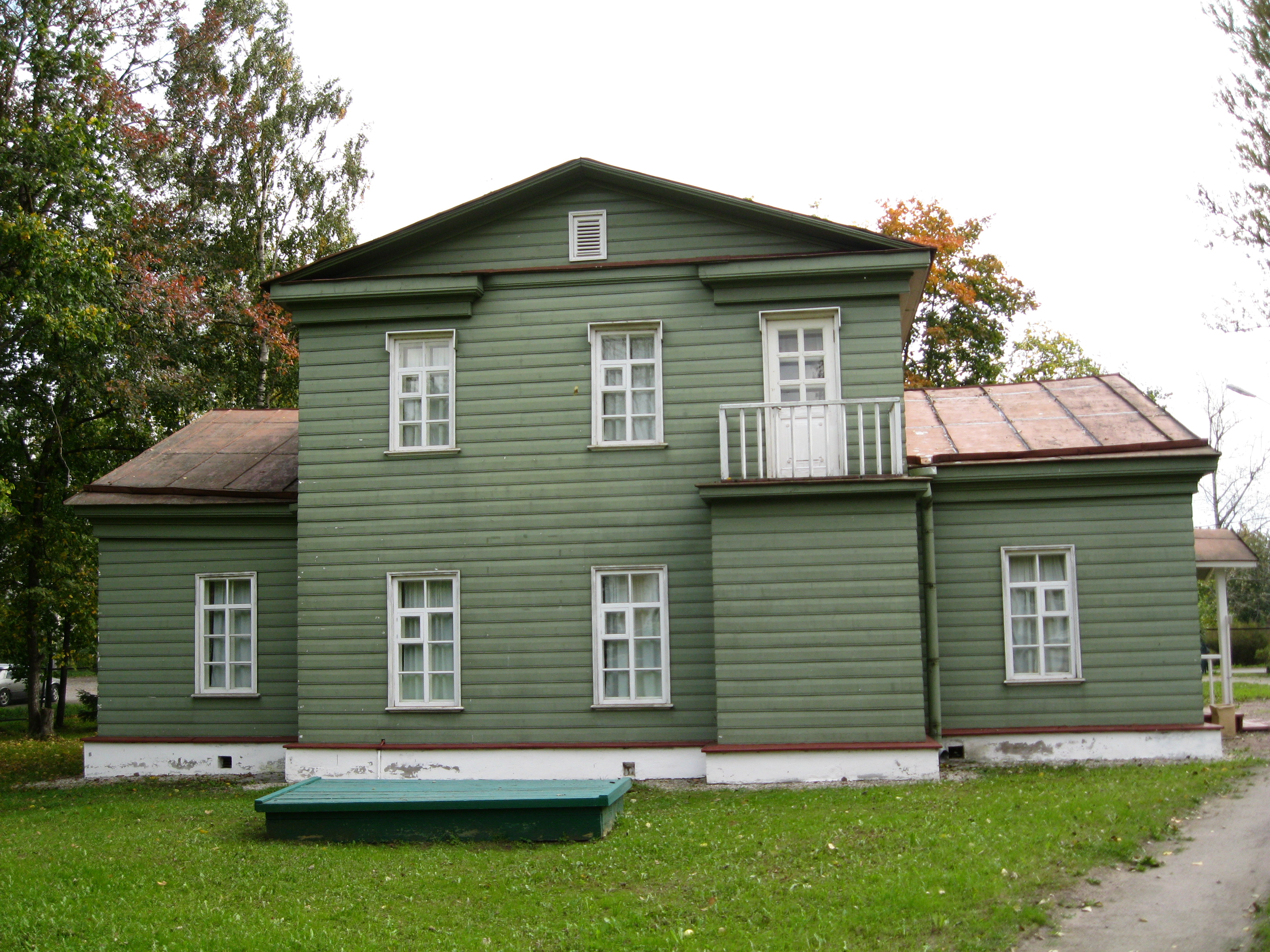
The Nekrasov Museum in Chudovo

The district contains nine cultural heritage monuments of federal significance and additionally sixty objects classified as cultural and historical heritage of local significance. The federal monuments include the ensemble of the military installations for Count Arakcheyev Grenadier Regiment located in the selo of Selishchi, the house of the author Gleb Uspensky in the village of Syabrenitsy, the house of the poet Nikolay Nekrasov and the school building constructed by him, both located in Chudovo.

There are several museums in the district. The Chudovo District Museum was opened in 1987 and displays collections of local interest. The house of Nikolay Nekrasov is located in Chudovo. This house was bought by Nekrasov to use for hunting. Nekrasov was visited by his friends, some of whom were notable Russian authors. The house of Gleb Uspensky in Syabrenitsy also became a museum.
