= Chudovo, Chudovsky District, Novgorod Oblast =

Town in Novgorod Oblast, Russia

Chudovo Чудово
- Town
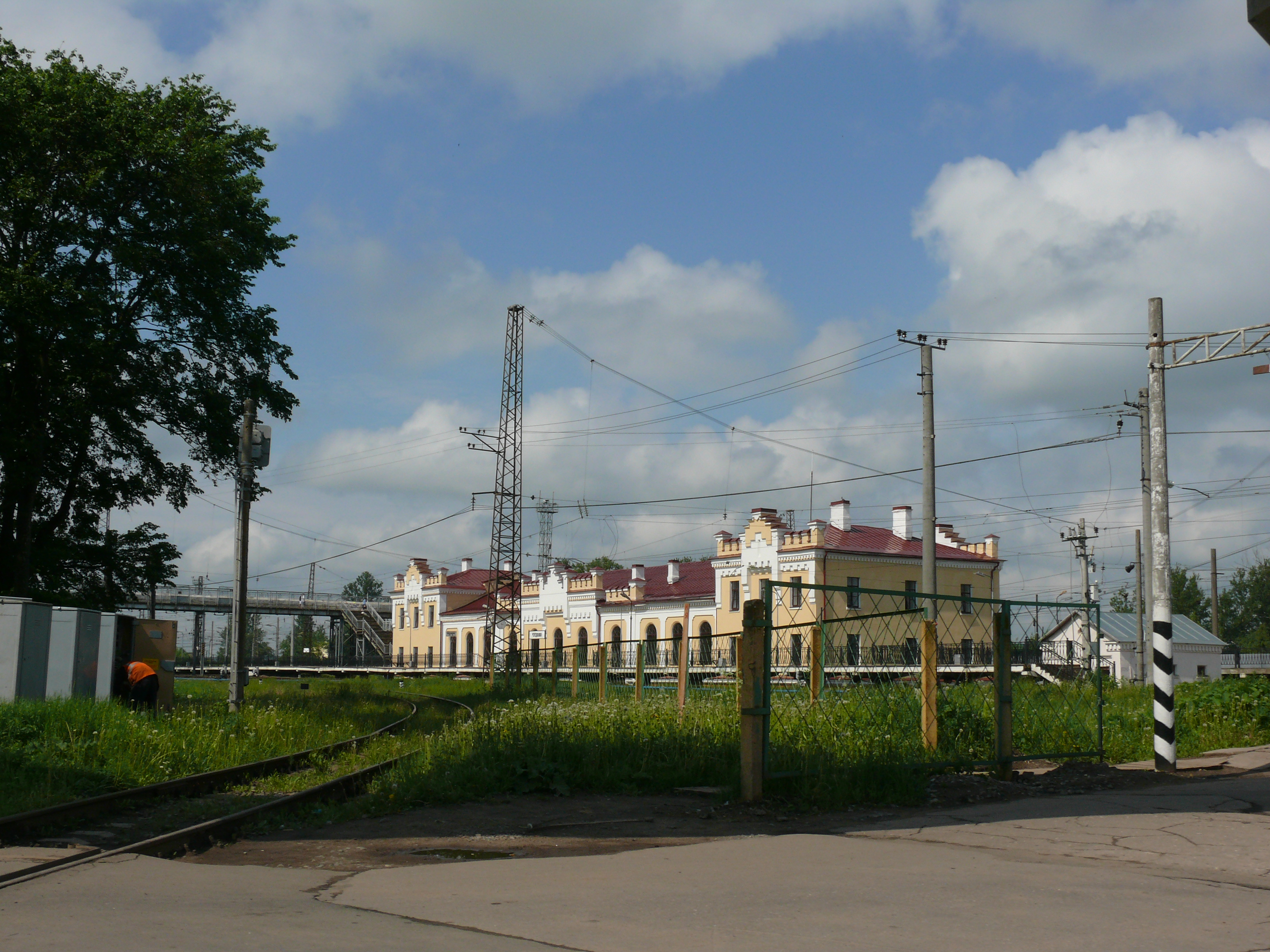
- Chudovo railway station

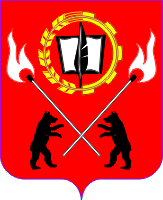
- Coat of arms
- Interactive map of Chudovo
- Location of Chudovo Chudovo (Novgorod Oblast)
- Coordinates: 59°07′N 31°40′E
- Country: Russia
- Federal subject: Novgorod Oblast
- Administrative district: Chudovsky District
- Town of district significanceSelsoviet: Chudovo
- First mentioned: 1539
- Town status since: July 20, 1937
- Elevation: 30 m (98 ft)

Population (2010 Census)
  - Total: 15,397
  - Estimate (2021): 14,302 (−7.1%)

Administrative status
  - Capital of: Chudovsky District, town of district significance of Chudovo

Municipal status
  - Municipal district: Chudovsky Municipal District
  - Urban settlement: Chudovo Urban Settlement
  - Capital of: Chudovsky Municipal District, Chudovo Urban Settlement
- Time zone: UTC+3 (MSK)
- Postal codes: 174210, 174211
- OKTMO ID: 49650101001
- Website: www.gorod-chudovoadm.ru

Chudovo (Russian: Чýдово) is a town and the administrative center of Chudovsky District in Novgorod Oblast, Russia, located on the Kerest River (a left tributary of the Volkhov). Population: 15,397 (2010 census); 17,434 (2002 census); 17,982 (1989 Soviet census).

== History ==
Historical affiliations

Grand Duchy of Moscow 1539–1547
Tsardom of Russia 1547–1721
Russian Empire 1721–1917
Russian Republic 1917
Soviet Russia 1917–1922
Soviet Union 1922–1991
Russian Federation 1991–present

The village of Chudovo was first mentioned in chronicles in 1539. By the mid-18th century, it developed into a big selo with a postal service station. By the beginning of the 19th century, Chudovo was the seat of Chudovskaya Volost of Novgorodsky Uyezd in Novgorod Governorate. The development of the area was further aided by the construction of the Moscow–St. Petersburg Railway, which opened in 1851. The railway to Novgorod was completed in 1871. A match factory, two cement-making factories, and a number of porcelain factories were built.

In August 1927, the uyezds were abolished and, effective October 1, 1927, Chudovsky District was established, with the administrative center in Chudovo. Novgorod Governorate was abolished as well and the district became a part of Novgorod Okrug of Leningrad Oblast. On June 25, 1928, Chudovo was granted urban-type settlement status; town status was granted on July 20, 1937. On July 23, 1930 the okrugs were abolished and the districts were directly subordinated to the oblast.

During World War II, between August 20, 1941, and January 29, 1944, Chudovo was occupied by German troops. On July 5, 1944, Chudovsky District was transferred to newly established Novgorod Oblast and has remained there ever since.

== Administrative and municipal status ==
Within the framework of administrative divisions, Chudovo serves as the administrative center of Chudovsky District. As an administrative division, it is incorporated within Chudovsky District as the town of district significance of Chudovo. As a municipal division, the town of district significance of Chudovo is incorporated within Chudovsky Municipal District as Chudovo Urban Settlement.

=== Local government ===
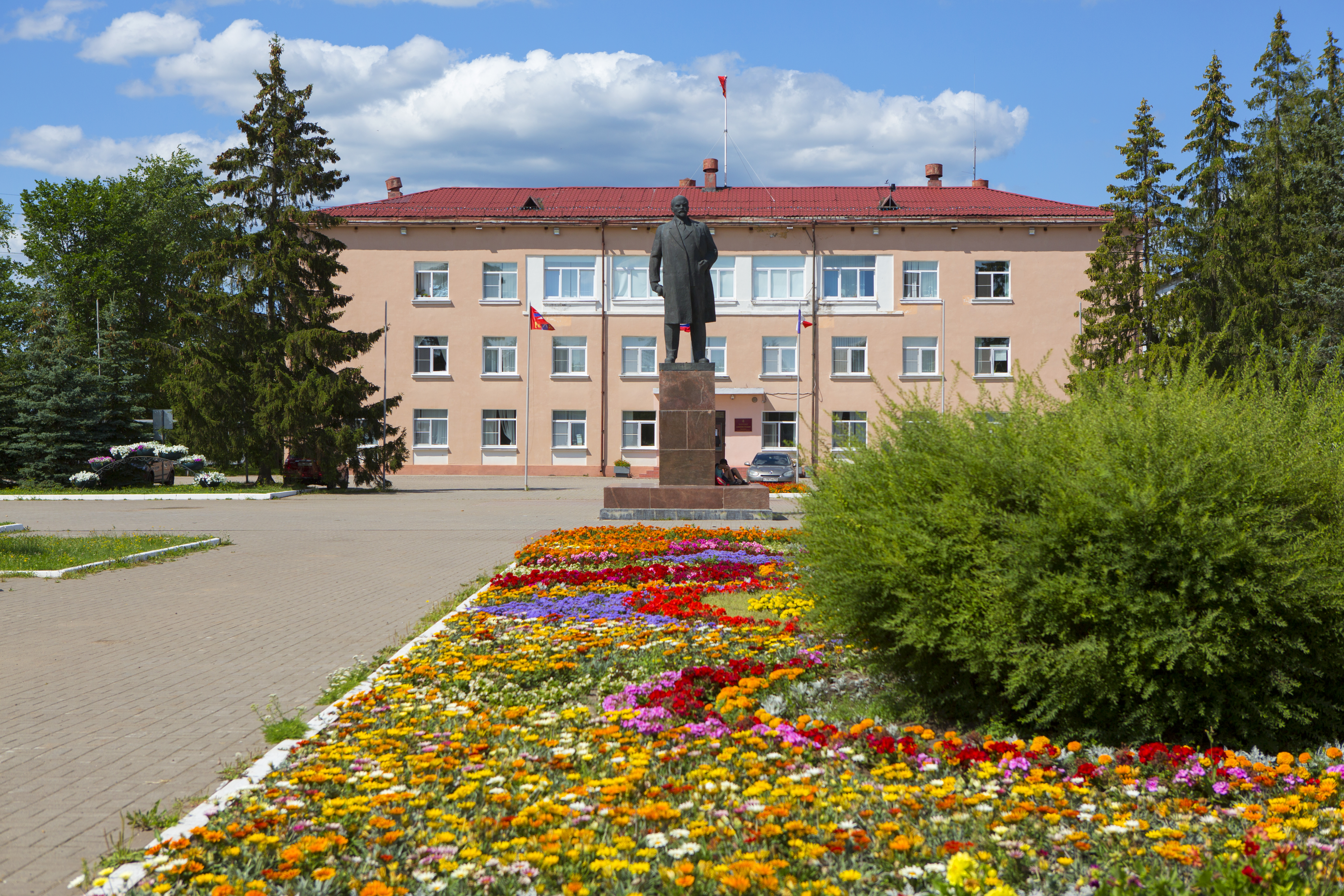
The building of the administration of Chudovo and the Chudovsky district on Nekrasov Street and the monument to Vladimir Lenin

The local government of the town of Chudovo consists of:

- The Council of Deputies is the representative body of the municipality. It consists of 15 deputies elected for 5 years. Deputies can create parliamentary associations - factions. 4 deputies represent the town council in the Chudovsky District Duma. In the 2020 Russian regional elections, the fourth convocation was elected. The elections were held according to a majoritarian system in three five-mandate electoral districts.
- The mayor is the highest official of the town of Chudovo. He is elected by deputies by secret ballot for the term of office of the Council of Deputies and is also the chairman of the Council of Deputies. The mayor of Chudovo is a member of the Chudovo District Duma. In 2020, Oleg Cherkashin (United Russia, district No. 2) was elected mayor.
- Control and accounting body.

== Economy ==
=== Industry ===
The largest industries of the town include a match factory, a plywood factory, and a Cadbury Schweppes factory. The former glass-making factory in Chudovo was reoriented to production of insulation materials.

=== Transportation ===
Chudovo lies on the federal M10 Highway connecting Moscow and St. Petersburg, 80 kilometers (50 mi) north of Veliky Novgorod and 100 kilometers (62 mi) south of St. Petersburg. It is an important railway junction at the intersection of the Moscow–St. Petersburg Railway (inaugurated in 1851) and the Veliky Novgorod–Volkhov branch (railway between Chudovo and Staraya Russa via Veliky Novgorod was opened on July 12, 1878; however, the segment beyond Veliky Novgorod was destroyed during World War II and never restored).

== Culture and recreation ==
There are two objects in Chudovo classified as cultural and historical heritage of federal significance and seven more objects of local significance. The federal monuments are the house of Nikolay Nekrasov and the school building constructed by him. The local monuments are monuments to soldiers fallen during World War II.

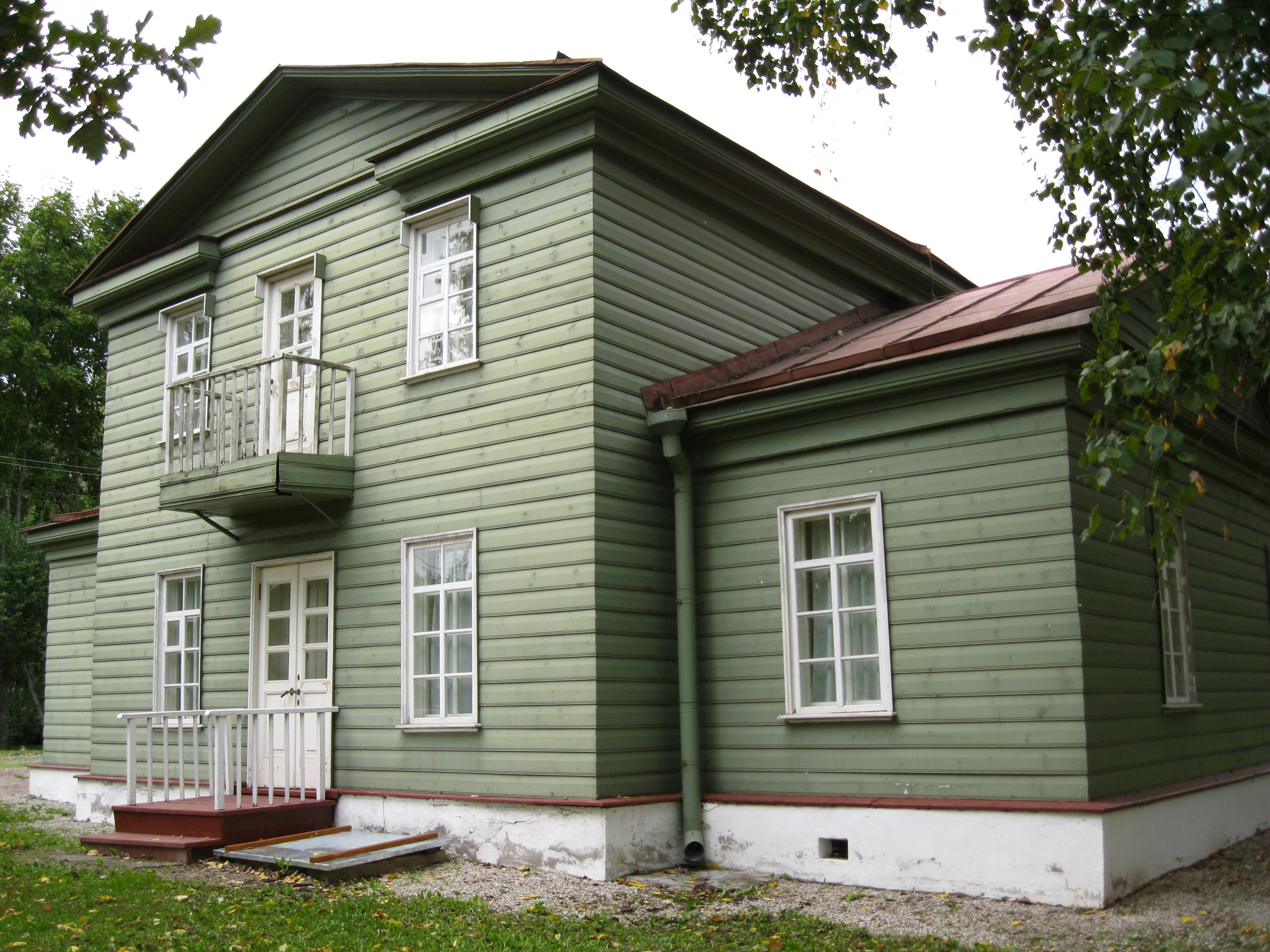
The Nekrasov Museum in Chudovo

The museum of Nikolay Nekrasov is in the house where he used to work in summertime between 1871 and 1876. In the nearby village of Syabrenitsy there is a museum of the writer Gleb Uspensky, housed in the building where he used to live in the 1880s. Count Alexey Arakcheyev's residence Gruzino is several miles away. The Chudovsky District Museum was opened in 1987 and displays collections of local interest.
