= Okulovka (town), Novgorod Oblast =

Town in Novgorod Oblast, Russia

Okulovka Окуловка
- Town
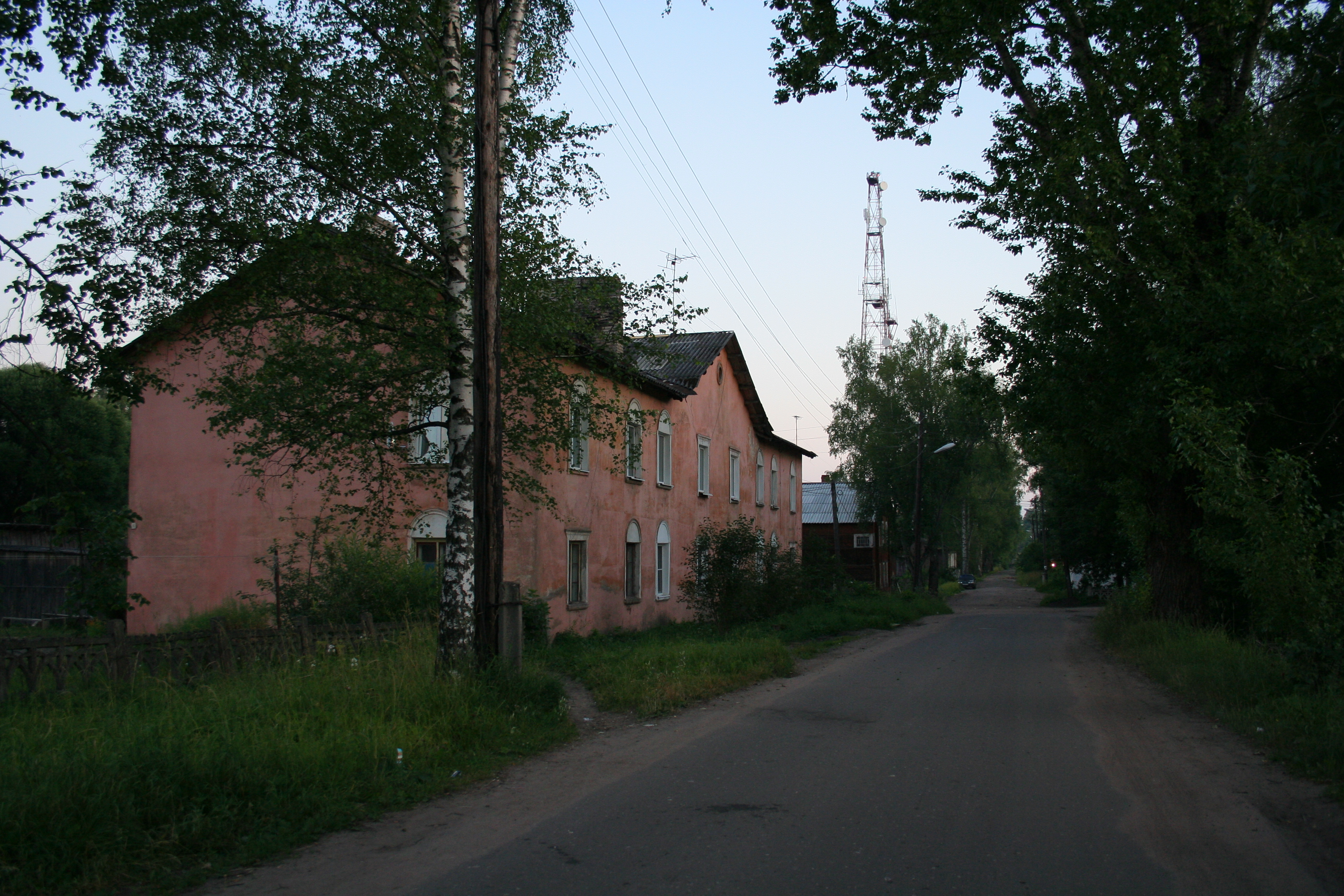
- A street in Okulovka

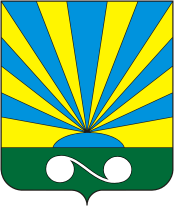
- Coat of arms
- Interactive map of Okulovka
- Location of Okulovka Okulovka (Novgorod Oblast)
- Coordinates: 58°22′N 33°20′E
- Country: Russia
- Federal subject: Novgorod Oblast
- Administrative district: Okulovsky District
- Town of district significanceSelsoviet: Okulovka
- Founded: 1851
- Town status since: January 12, 1965
- Elevation: 161 m (528 ft)

Population (2010 Census)
  - Total: 12,464
  - Estimate (2021): 9,949 (−20.2%)

Administrative status
  - Capital of: Okulovsky District, town of district significance of Okulovka

Municipal status
  - Municipal district: Okulovsky Municipal District
  - Urban settlement: Okulovskoye Urban Settlement
  - Capital of: Okulovsky Municipal District, Okulovskoye Urban Settlement
- Time zone: UTC+3 (MSK)
- Postal code: 174350–174353
- OKTMO ID: 49628101001
- Website: okulovka-adm.ru

Okulovka (Russian: Оку́ловка) is a town and the administrative center of Okulovsky District in Novgorod Oblast, Russia, located in the Valdai Hills, on the Peretna River, 140 kilometers (87 mi) east of Veliky Novgorod, the administrative center of the oblast. Population: 12,464 (2010 census); 14,470 (2002 census); 17,197 (1989 Soviet census).

== History ==
Settlements located in the current area of Okulovsky district were first mentioned in chronicles in 1495 as belonging to Derevskaya pyatina. However, the settlement of Okulovka has only been known since 1851 and appeared in connection with the construction of the Nikolayevskaya Railway which connected Moscow and St. Petersburg. Okulovka developed first as a settlement serving the railway stations and eventually industries proliferated. It initially was a part of Borovichsky Uyezd in Novgorod Governorate. In the beginning of the 20th century, it was the administrative center of Okulovskaya Volost of Malovishersky Uyezd in Novgorod Governorate.

In August 1927, the uyezds were abolished and, effective October 1, 1927, Okulovsky District was established, with the administrative center in Okulovka. Novgorod Governorate was abolished as well and the district became a part of Borovichi Okrug of Leningrad Oblast. Okulovka was granted urban-type settlement status on June 25, 1928. On July 23, 1930, the okrugs were abolished and the districts were directly subordinated to the oblast. During World War II, Okulovsky District was not occupied by German troops; however, being adjacent to the front line, Okulovka played an important role. On July 5, 1944, Okulovsky District was transferred to newly established Novgorod Oblast and remained there ever since. On January 12, 1965, the urban-type settlements of Okulovka and Parakhino-Poddubye were merged to form the town of Okulovka, which became the administrative center of Okulovsky District.

== Administrative and municipal status ==
Within the framework of administrative divisions, Okulovka serves as the administrative center of Okulovsky District. As an administrative division, it is, together with two rural localities, incorporated within Okulovsky District as the town of district significance of Okulovka. As a municipal division, the town of district significance of Okulovka is incorporated within Okulovsky Municipal District as Okulovskoye Urban Settlement.

== Economy ==
=== Industry ===
There are three big factories in Okulovka, producing wire, electronics, and furniture. There are also smaller-scale enterprises of textile industry and of food industry.

=== Transportation ===
Okulovka is an important station on the Moscow–St. Petersburg Railway, the first long-distance railway constructed in Russia, opened in 1851 and built as a straight line. Another line to Nebolchi via Lyubytino branches off to the northeast. Okulovka is a terminal station for suburban trains, which leave in three directions: to Bologoye, Malaya Vishera, and Nebolchi. Most of the long-distance trains call at Okulovka as well.

The historical building of the railway station was demolished in 2003 under the pretext of the construction of the speed rail tracks for the Sapsan train. Money was allocated for the construction of the new station building, but as of 2011, the construction did not start.

Okulovka is connected by roads with Borovichi, Tikhvin (via Lyubytino), Bologoye via (Lykoshino), and Kresttsy. There are also local roads.

== Culture and recreation ==
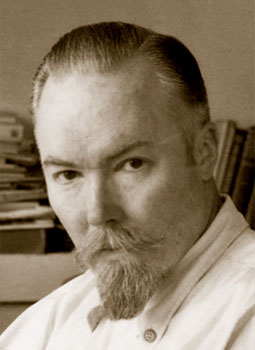
G. de Roerich

Okulovka contains twenty-nine cultural heritage monuments of local significance. These include pre-1917 houses and workshops, monuments to fallen soldiers, and one archaeological site.

Okulovka is home to the Miklukho-Maklay Okulovka District Museum. It is named after Nicholas Miklouho-Maclay, a Russian ethnographer notable for his studies of indigenous population of Papua. Miklouho-Maclay was born on the territory of what now is Okulovsky District, where his father, a construction engineer, was involved in the railroad construction.

George de Roerich was born in Okulovka in August 1902. Later George became a scientist, orientalist, and guru. He is known for his contributions to Tibetan dialectology, his monumental translation of the Blue Annals, and his 11-volume Tibetan-Russian-English dictionary with Sanskrit parallels. After spending almost 30 years in India George returned in 1957 to Russia.
