= Volkhov (river) =

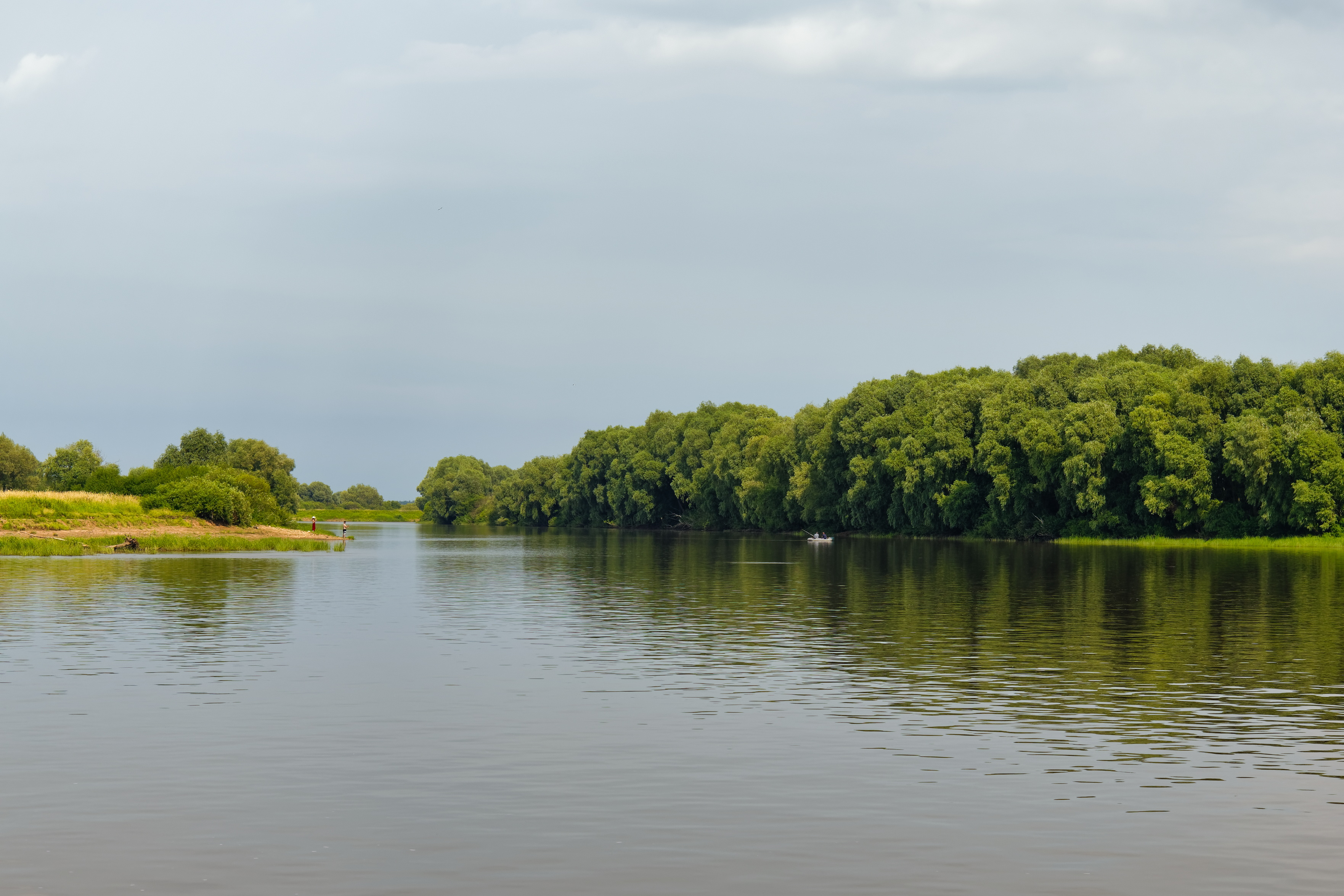
- Native name: Волхов (Russian)

Location
- Country: Russia
- Region: Novgorod Oblast, Leningrad Oblast
- Cities: Veliky Novgorod, Kirishi, Volkhov, Novaya Ladoga

Physical characteristics
- Source: Lake Ilmen
  - coordinates: 58°28′N 31°17′E
  - elevation: 18 m (59 ft)
- Mouth: Lake Ladoga
  - coordinates: 60°07′N 32°19′E
  - elevation: 5 m (16 ft)
- Length: 224 km (139 mi)
- Basin size: 80,200 km^{2} (31,000 sq mi)
- Discharge
  - location: mouth
  - average: 580 m^{3}/s (20,000 cu ft/s)
  - minimum: 44 m^{3}/s (1,600 cu ft/s)
  - maximum: 2,900 m^{3}/s (100,000 cu ft/s)

Basin features
- Progression: Lake Ladoga→ Neva→ Gulf of Finland
- Tributaries
  - left: Tigoda
  - right: Vishera, Oskuya, Pchyovzha

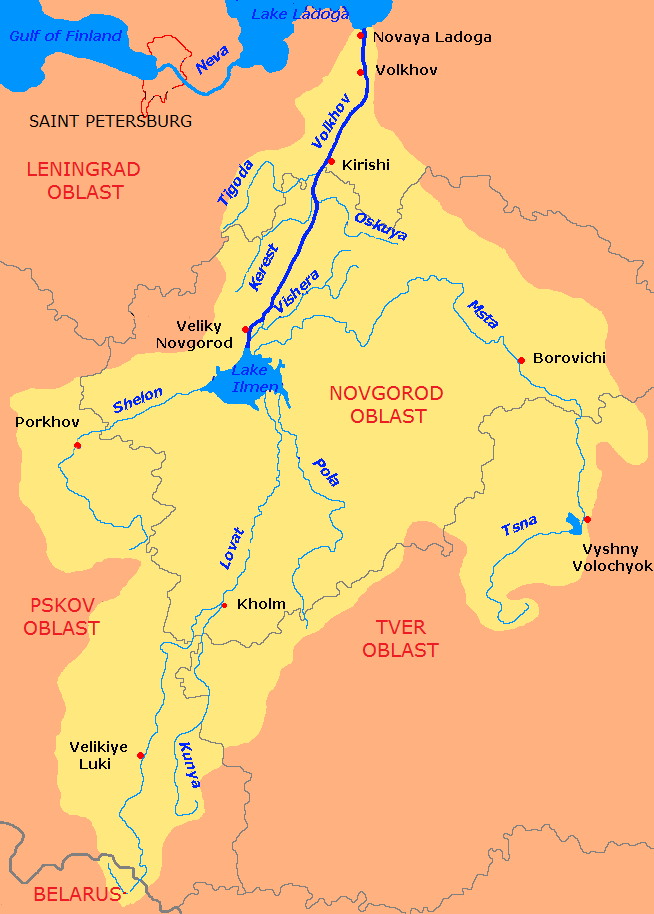
The Volkhov River drainage basin

The Volkhov (/ˈvɔːlxɒv/ VAWL-khov; Russian: Волхов [ˈvoɫxəf]; Veps: Olhav) is a river in Novgorodsky and Chudovsky Districts of Novgorod Oblast and Kirishsky and Volkhovsky Districts of Leningrad Oblast in northwestern Russia. The Volkhov, which forms part of the basin of the Neva, is the only outflow of Lake Ilmen, and connects it with Lake Ladoga. The length of the Volkhov is 224 kilometres (139 mi), and the area of its drainage basin is 80,200 square kilometres (31,000 mi^{2}). The city of Veliky Novgorod, the towns of Kirishi, Volkhov and Novaya Ladoga, and the historically important village of Staraya Ladoga are located along the Volkhov.

== Etymology ==
A number of etymologies, none universally accepted, have been proposed for the name of the river. In his Etymological dictionary of the Russian language, Max Vasmer casts doubt on the opinion of certain philologists that the name of the river could be cognate with the Finnish velho ("magician") or Russian volkhv ("pagan priest").

== Geography ==
The Volkhov flows out of Lake Ilmen north into Lake Ladoga, the largest lake in Europe. It is the second largest tributary of Lake Ladoga. It is navigable over its whole length. Discharge is highly variable depending primarily on the level of Lake Ilmen. The Volkhov is reported to reverse the direction of its flow in its upper section in exceptional circumstances. The river freezes up in late November, and breaks up in early April.

The level of water is regulated by the dam of the Volkhov hydroelectric plant (the first Soviet regional hydroelectric dam opened on December 19, 1926, in the framework of the GOELRO plan) situated 25 km upstream from the mouth of the river. Apart from hydroelectric generating purposes, the dam serves to facilitate navigation in the lower part of the river previously known for its rapids.

The upstream part of the Volkhov is connected to the Msta by the Siversov Canal (or Sievers Canal, named in honour of Baltic German statesman Jacob von Sievers) bypassing Lake Ilmen. The downstream part is connected with the Neva, the Syas, and the Svir by the Ladoga Canal bypassing Lake Ladoga.

The main tributaries of the Volkhov are the Vishera (right), joins the Maly Volkhovets armlet; the Kerest (left); the Oskuya (right); the Pchyovzha (right); the Tigoda (left); the Chyornaya (right); the Vloya (left); the Olomna (left).

The drainage basin of the Volkhov includes large parts of Novgorod and Leningrad Oblasts, as well as areas in Tver Oblast, Pskov Oblast of Russia and Vitebsk Oblast of Belarus. The main rivers belonging to the river basin of the Volkhov are the Msta, the Lovat, the Pola, and the Shelon.

== History ==
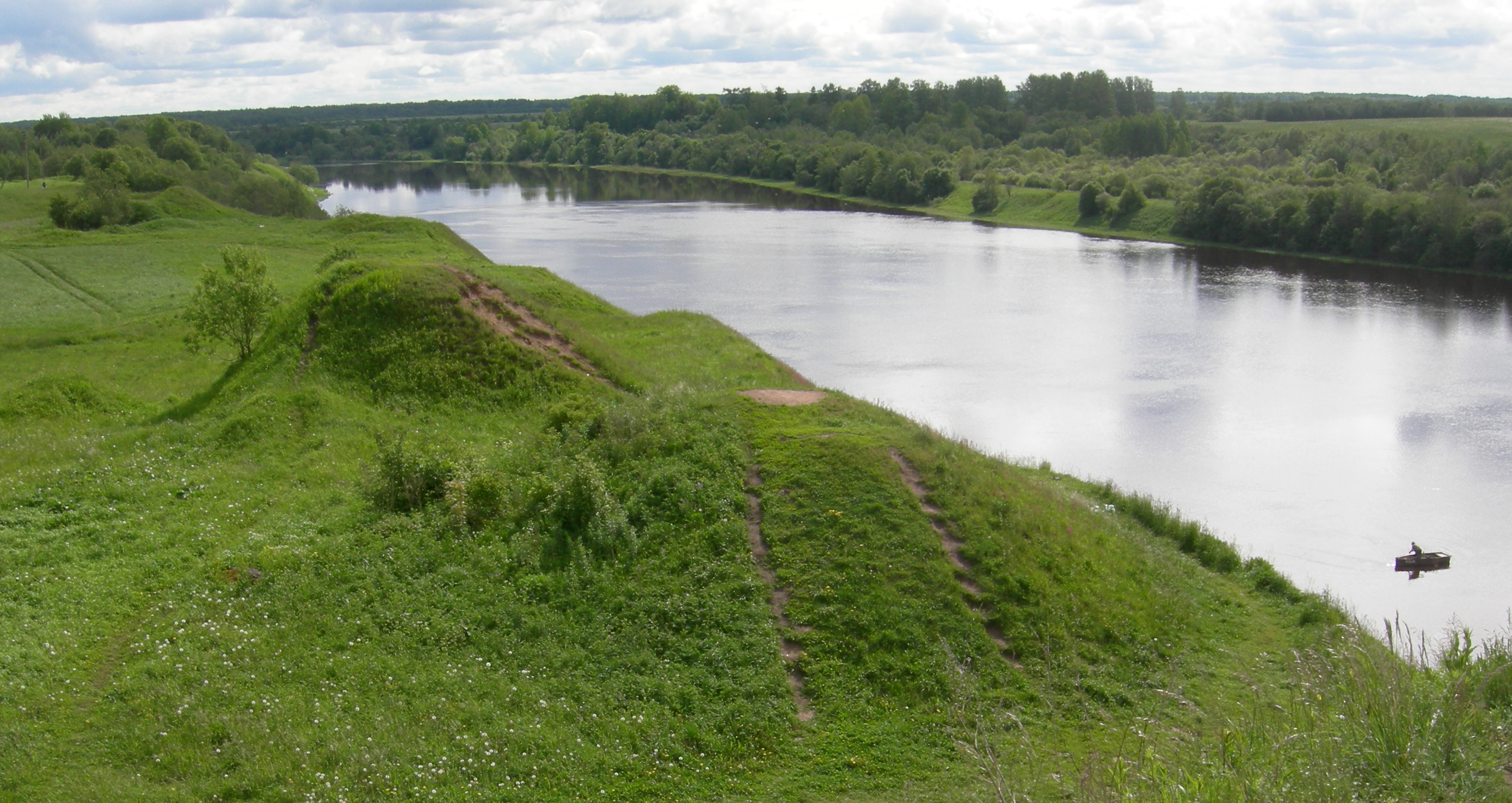
8th to 10th century Viking burial mounds along the Volkhov near Staraya Ladoga

Despite its relatively small size, Volkhov has played a large role in Russian history and economy: in recognition of that, a figure representing the Volkhov appears among the allegorical monuments to the four major rivers of Russia (the others are: Volga, Dnieper and Neva) on the rostral columns in the ensemble of the Old Saint Petersburg Stock Exchange and Rostral Columns. Its role in facilitating trade is due to its position as the only river penetrating deep into inland Russia that flows north towards the Baltic, rather than south towards the Caspian or Black Seas.

In the mid-9th century, the Volkhov was a heavily populated trade artery of the Varangian-dominated Rus' Khaganate. It was a vital part of the most important trade route connecting Northern Europe to the Orient, by way of the Volga (Volga trade route) and Dnieper (trade route from the Varangians to the Greeks). The ancient Russian capital Staraya Ladoga and one of the most significant Russian medieval cities Veliky Novgorod are located along the Volkhov. The river carried a significant portion of the trade between Novgorod and Western Europe.

After entering the Volkhov near Gorchakovshchina and Lyubsha, commercial vessels of the Vikings cast anchor at the major trade emporium of Aldeigja (Ladoga). Then they rowed upstream past a series of rapids, guarded by the fortified settlements at Novye Duboviki and Gorodishche. There was another outpost at Kholopy Gorodok, 13 km north of present-day Velikiy Novgorod, or rather Holmgard, which was founded near the point where the Volkhov flows from Lake Ilmen.

"Most of these were initially small sites, probably not much more than stations for re-fitting and resupply, providing an opportunity for exchange and the redistribution of items passing along the river and caravan routes". It seems on the whole likely that such pre-urban settlements gave the country its Norse name of Gardariki.

During World War II, the stretch of the Volkhov north of Veliky Novgorod separated Soviet (right bank) and German (left bank) troops between 1941 and 1944. German soldiers built extensive "underground cities" along the battlefront. Local birch was used for constructing shelters and hundreds of miles of corduroy road in the swampland. Buildings were on slopes to allow for drainage. "Six or eight men occupy each hut and there are also underground stables and storage places for coal and supplies."

== Transportation ==
The entire Volkhov River is navigable; however, there is no passenger navigation.

As with other navigable rivers, the navigability of the Volkhov makes it possible to transport bulky pieces of equipment which are inconvenient to ship by rail or road due to their size. In 2015, the Volkhov was part of a route of a river barge transporting a VVER-1200 nuclear reactor vessel from the Atommash plant in Volgodonsk. After being moved by the barge up the Volkhov to Novgorod, the reactor was taken across the city to the train station, and then shipped by a special rail car to Belarus.

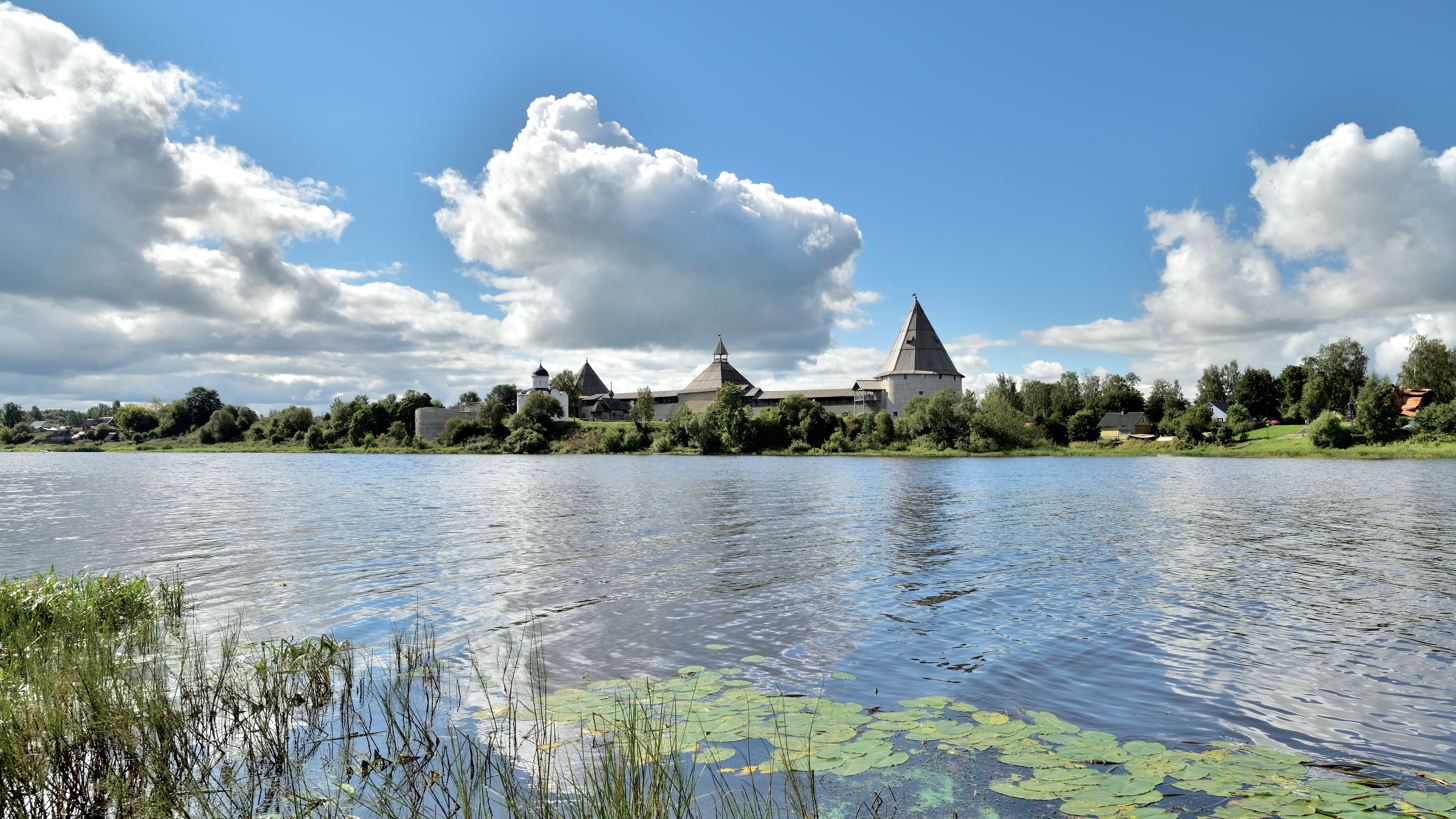
View of the Volkhov River near Staraya Ladoga

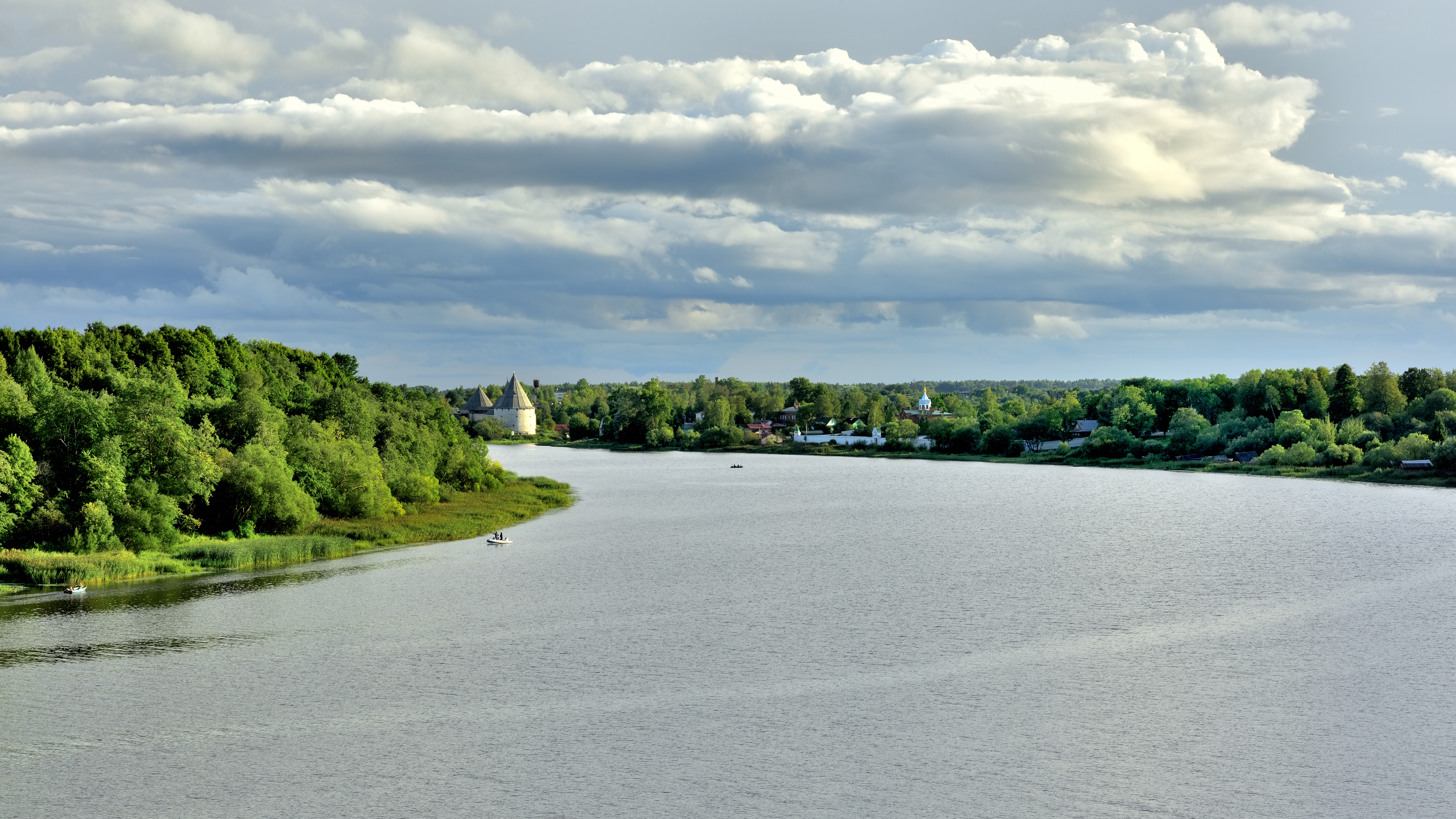
The banks of the Volkhov River near Staraya Ladoga

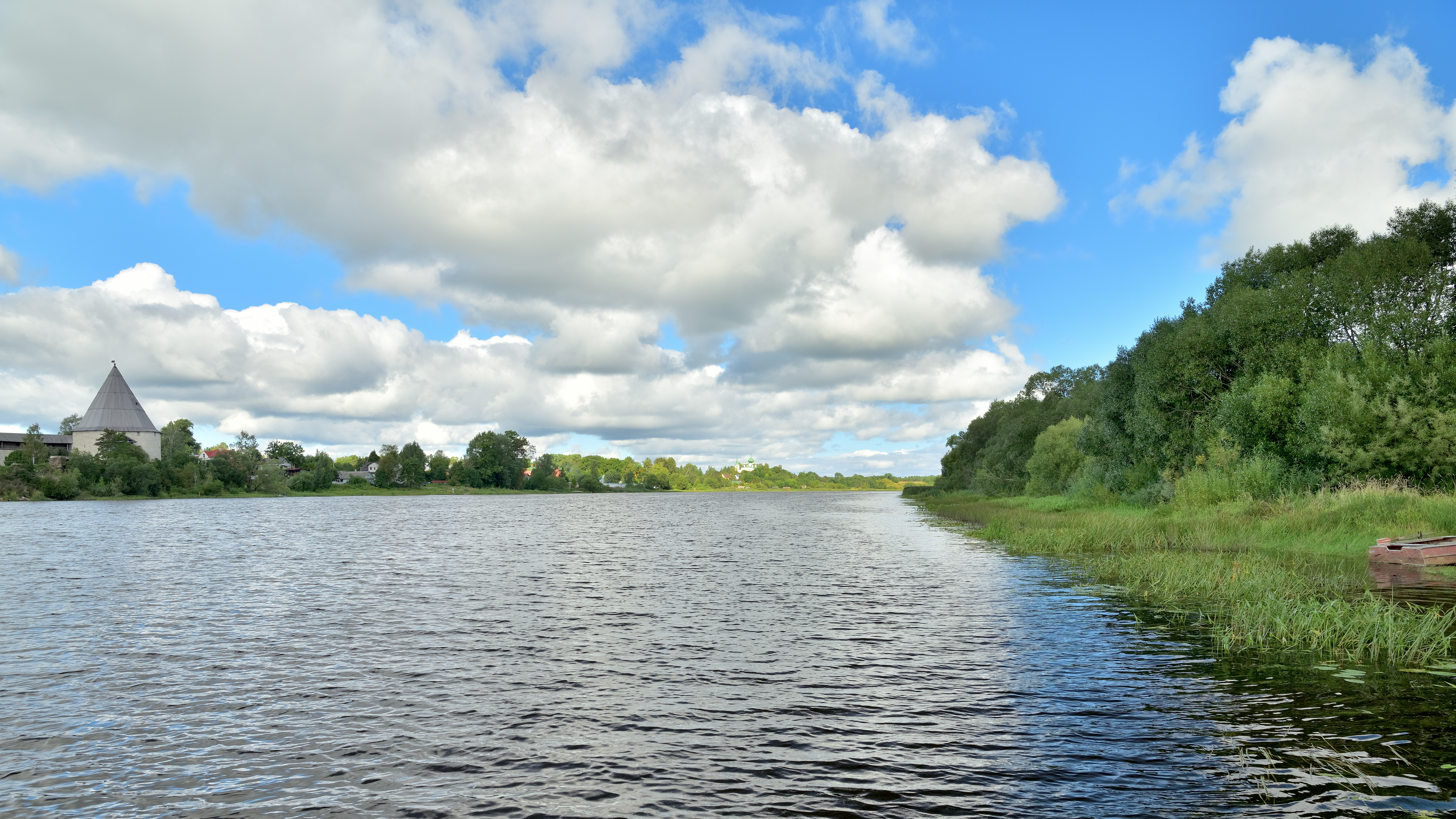
Volkhov River, view downstream on the fortress of Staraya Ladoga

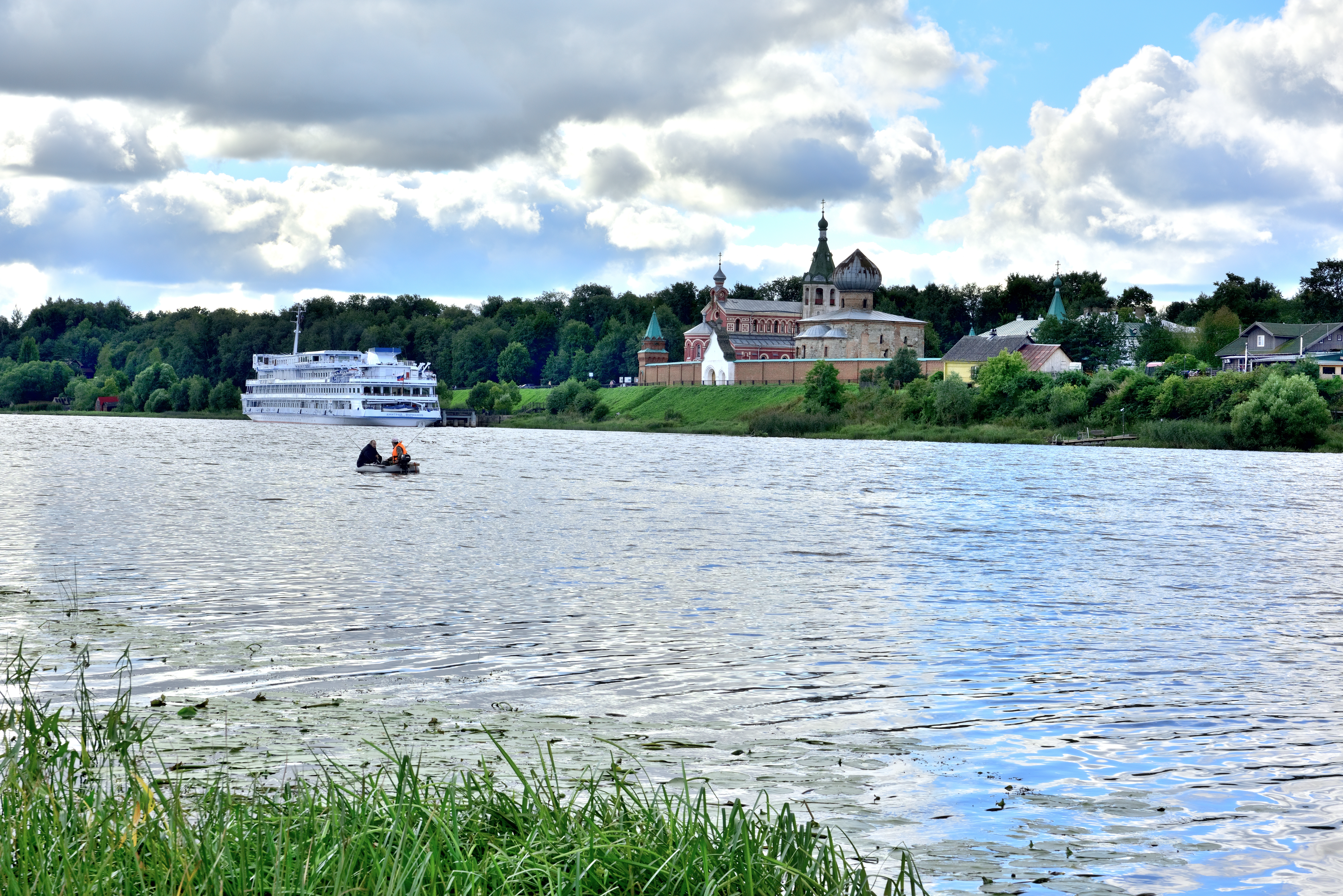
Excursion boat on the river near Staraya Ladoga
