= Nebolchi =

Nebolchi Неболчи
- Work settlement
- Interactive map of Nebolchi
- Location of Nebolchi Nebolchi (Novgorod Oblast)
- Coordinates: 59°07′N 33°21′E
- Country: Russia
- Federal subject: Novgorod Oblast
- Administrative district: Lyubytinsky District
- established: 1916
- Urban-type settlement status since: 1963

Population (2010 Census)
  - Total: 2,030
  - Estimate (2025): 1,687 (−16.9%)

Municipal status
  - Municipal district: Lyubytinsky Municipal District
  - Urban settlement: Nebolchskoye Urban Settlement
  - Capital of: Nebolchskoye Urban Settlement
- Time zone: UTC+3 (MSK)
- Postal code: 174755
- OKTMO ID: 49616431051

Nebolchi (Russian: Неболчи) is an urban locality (a work settlement) in Lyubytinsky District of Novgorod Oblast, Russia. Municipally, it serves as the administrative center of Nebolchskoye Urban Settlement, one of the two urban settlements in the district. Population: 2,030 (2010 census); 2,249 (2002 census); 2,393 (1989 Soviet census).

== History ==
The area was first mentioned in 1564 as Yegoryevsky Pogost in Nebolchi. In the 19th century, it belonged to Tikhvinsky Uyezd of Novgorod Governorate. In the beginning of the 20th century, there was no settlement, and the current area of Nebolchi was covered by woods. The settlement of Nebolchi was founded in 1916 when the railway station was opened. In 1918, Tikhvinsky Uyezd, including Nebolzhi, was transferred to the newly established Cherepovets Governorate. On August 1, 1927, the governorate was abolished, and the area was transferred to Leningrad Oblast. Simultaneously, uyezds were abolished in favor of districts. In particular, Zhukovsky District with the center in the selo of Zhukovo was established, as part of Leningradsky Okrug of Leningrad Oblast. On July 23, 1930 the okrugs were abolished, and the districts became directly subordinate to the oblast. On March 11, 1931, Zhukovsky District was renamed into Dregelsky District. On June 20, 1933 the district center was transferred to Nebolchi. Dregelsky District was partially occupied by German forces between October 31 and December 8, 1941. Nebolchi was not occupied, but played an important role in delivering goods to the troops. In 1944, the district was transferred to Novgorod Oblast. On February 1, 1962 Dregelsky District was abolished. After a number of reforms, in 1965 the area of the former district, including Nebolchi, was included into Lyubytinsky District.

Nebolchi was granted urban-type settlement status on January 8, 1963.

== Economy ==
=== Industry ===
In industry, there is timber industry present. There is also a bakery.

=== Transportation ===
Nebolchi is a railway junction station. The main line passing through Nebolchi is the one connecting Sonkovo and Mga. Another railway branching off south connects Nebolchi via Lyubytino with Okulovka, which lies on the main line connecting Moscow and Saint Petersburg.

Nebolchi is connected by roads via Boksitogorsk with A113 highway which connects Vologda and Saint Petersburg, via Lyubytino and Malaya Vishera with M10 highway which connects Moscow and Saint Petersburg, and with Budogoshch. There are also local roads.
