= Borovinka =

Borovinka (Russian: Боровинка) is the name of several rural localities in Russia:

- Borovinka, Velsky District, Arkhangelsk Oblast, a village in Pezhemskoye Rural Settlement of Velsky District, Arkhangelsk Oblast
- Borovinka, Kotlassky District, Arkhangelsk Oblast, a village in Cheremushskoye Rural Settlement of Kotlassky District, Arkhangelsk Oblast
- Borovinka, Velikoustyugsky District, Vologda Oblast, a village in Krasavinskoye Rural Settlement, Velikoustyugsky District, Vologda Oblast
- Borovinka, Ustyuzhensky District, Vologda Oblast, a khutor) in Ustyuzhenskoye Rural Settlement, Ustyuzhensky District, Vologda Oblast
