= Borodino, Ustyuzhensky District, Vologda Oblast =

Borodino Бородино
- Village
- Location within Vologda Oblast Location within Russia
- Coordinates: 58°42′N 36°27′E
- Country: Russia
- Region: Vologda Oblast
- District: Ustyuzhensky District
- Time zone: UTC+3:00

Borodino (Russian: Бородино) is a rural locality (a village) in Nikiforovskoye Rural Settlement, Ustyuzhensky District, Vologda Oblast, Russia. The population was 11 as of 2002.

== Geography ==
Borodino is located 16 km (9.9 mi) south of Ustyuzhna (the district's administrative centre) by road. Danilovskoye is the nearest rural locality.
