= Sludy =

Sludy (Russian: Слуды) is the name of several rural localities (villages) in Russia:

- Sludy, Novgorod Oblast, a village in Kirovskoye Settlement of Moshenskoy District of Novgorod Oblast
- Sludy, Tver Oblast, a village in Vesyegonsky District of Tver Oblast
- Sludy, Vologda Oblast, a village in Modensky Selsoviet of Ustyuzhensky District of Vologda Oblast
