= Derevyaga =

Derevyaga Деревяга
- Village
- Location within Vologda Oblast Location within Russia
- Coordinates: 58°54′N 36°11′E
- Country: Russia
- Region: Vologda Oblast
- District: Ustyuzhensky District
- Time zone: UTC+3:00

Derevyaga (Russian: Деревяга) is a rural locality (a village) in Mezzhenskoye Rural Settlement, Ustyuzhensky District, Vologda Oblast, Russia. The population was 1 as of 2002. There are 2 streets.

== Geography ==
Derevyaga is located 20 km (12 mi) northwest of Ustyuzhna (the district's administrative centre) by road. Mochala is the nearest rural locality.
