= Astashkino =

Astashkino Асташкино
- Village
- Location within Vologda Oblast Location within Russia
- Coordinates: 58°37′N 36°13′E
- Country: Russia
- Region: Vologda Oblast
- District: Ustyuzhensky District
- Time zone: UTC+3:00

Astashkino (Russian: Асташкино) is a rural locality (a village) in Zalesskoye Rural Settlement, Ustyuzhensky District, Vologda Oblast, Russia. The population was 44 as of 2002.

== Geography ==
Astashkino is located 34 km (21 mi) southwest of Ustyuzhna (the district's administrative centre) by road. Brenchikha is the nearest rural locality.
