= Mikhalyovo, Ustyuzhensky District, Vologda Oblast =

Mikhalyovo Михалёво
- Village
- Location within Vologda Oblast Location within Russia
- Coordinates: 58°57′N 35°59′E
- Country: Russia
- Region: Vologda Oblast
- District: Ustyuzhensky District
- Time zone: UTC+3:00

Mikhalyovo (Russian: Михалёво) is a rural locality (a village) in Mezzhenskoye Rural Settlement, Ustyuzhensky District, Vologda Oblast, Russia. The population was 5 as of 2002.

== Geography ==
Mikhalyovo is located 34 km (21 mi) northwest of Ustyuzhna (the district's administrative centre) by road. Dolotskoye is the nearest rural locality.
