= Kresttsy =

Kresttsy (Russian: Крестцы) is the name of several inhabited localities in Russia.

== Urban localities ==
- Kresttsy, Krestetsky District, Novgorod Oblast, a work settlement in Krestetsky District of Novgorod Oblast

== Rural localities ==
- Kresttsy, Leningrad Oblast, a village under the administrative jurisdiction of Budogoshchskoye Settlement Municipal Formation, Kirishsky District, Leningrad Oblast
- Kresttsy, Khvoyninsky District, Novgorod Oblast, a village in Kabozhskoye Settlement of Khvoyninsky District of Novgorod Oblast
- Kresttsy, Selizharovsky District, Tver Oblast, a village in Selizharovsky District, Tver Oblast
- Kresttsy, Staritsky District, Tver Oblast, a village in Staritsky District, Tver Oblast
- Kresttsy, Vologda Oblast, a village in Dubrovsky Selsoviet of Ustyuzhensky District of Vologda Oblast
- Kresttsy, Myshkinsky District, Yaroslavl Oblast, a village in Shipilovsky Rural Okrug of Myshkinsky District of Yaroslavl Oblast
- Kresttsy, Poshekhonsky District, Yaroslavl Oblast, a village in Pogorelsky Rural Okrug of Poshekhonsky District of Yaroslavl Oblast
