= Voronovo, Ustyuzhensky District, Vologda Oblast =

Voronovo Вороново
- Village
- Location within Vologda Oblast Location within Russia
- Coordinates: 58°45′N 36°28′E
- Country: Russia
- Region: Vologda Oblast
- District: Ustyuzhensky District
- Time zone: UTC+3:00

Voronovo (Russian: Вороново) is a rural locality (a village) in Ustyuzhenskoye Rural Settlement, Ustyuzhensky District, Vologda Oblast, Russia. The population was 17 as of 2002.

== Geography ==
Voronovo is located 14 km (8.7 mi) south of Ustyuzhna (the district's administrative centre) by road. Timonino is the nearest rural locality.
