= Ganki, Vologda Oblast =

Ganki Ганьки
- Village
- Location within Vologda Oblast Location within Russia
- Coordinates: 58°49′N 36°28′E
- Country: Russia
- Region: Vologda Oblast
- District: Ustyuzhensky District
- Time zone: UTC+3:00

Ganki (Russian: Ганьки) is a rural locality (a village) in Ustyuzhenskoye Rural Settlement, Ustyuzhensky District, Vologda Oblast, Russia. The population was 115 as of 2002. There are 2 streets.

== Geography ==
Ganki is located 2 km (1.2 mi) southeast of Ustyuzhna (the district's administrative centre) by road. Ustyuzhna is the nearest rural locality.
