= Melechino =

Melechino Мелечино
- Village
- Location within Vologda Oblast Location within Russia
- Coordinates: 58°39′N 36°21′E
- Country: Russia
- Region: Vologda Oblast
- District: Ustyuzhensky District
- Time zone: UTC+3:00

Melechino (Russian: Мелечино) is a rural locality (a village) in Nikiforovskoye Rural Settlement, Ustyuzhensky District, Vologda Oblast, Russia. The population was 187 as of 2002. There are 4 streets.

== Geography ==
Melechino is located 26 km (16 mi) south of Ustyuzhna (the district's administrative centre) by road. Gryada is the nearest rural locality.
