= Gromoshikha =

Gromoshikha Громошиха
- Village
- Location within Vologda Oblast Location within Russia
- Coordinates: 58°57′N 36°33′E
- Country: Russia
- Region: Vologda Oblast
- District: Ustyuzhensky District
- Time zone: UTC+3:00

Gromoshikha (Russian: Громошиха) is a rural locality (a village) in Lentyevskoye Rural Settlement, Ustyuzhensky District, Vologda Oblast, Russia. The population was 96 as of 2002. There are 4 streets.

== Geography ==
Gromoshikha is located 22 km (14 mi) northeast of Ustyuzhna (the district's administrative centre) by road. Imeni Zhelyabova is the nearest rural locality.
