= Martynovo, Ustyuzhensky District, Vologda Oblast =

Martynovo Мартыново
- Village
- Location within Vologda Oblast Location within Russia
- Coordinates: 58°51′N 37°00′E
- Country: Russia
- Region: Vologda Oblast
- District: Ustyuzhensky District
- Time zone: UTC+3:00

Martynovo (Russian: Мартыново) is a rural locality (a village) in Modenskoye Rural Settlement, Ustyuzhensky District, Vologda Oblast, Russia. The population was 1 as of 2002.

== Geography ==
Martynovo is located 40 km (25 mi) east of Ustyuzhna (the district's administrative centre) by road. Bolshaya Lipenka is the nearest rural locality.
