= Savino, Ustyuzhensky District, Vologda Oblast =

Savino Савино
- Village
- Location within Vologda Oblast Location within Russia
- Coordinates: 58°57′N 35°51′E
- Country: Russia
- Region: Vologda Oblast
- District: Ustyuzhensky District
- Time zone: UTC+3:00

Savino (Russian: Савино) is a rural locality (a village) in Mezzhenskoye Rural Settlement, Ustyuzhensky District, Vologda Oblast, Russia. The population was 7 as of 2002.

== Geography ==
Savino is located 40 km (25 mi) northwest of Ustyuzhna (the district's administrative centre) by road. Maloye Medvedovo is the nearest rural locality.
