= Meryozha =

Meryozha Мерёжа
- Village
- Location within Vologda Oblast Location within Russia
- Coordinates: 59°01′N 36°23′E
- Country: Russia
- Region: Vologda Oblast
- District: Ustyuzhensky District
- Time zone: UTC+3:00

Meryozha (Russian: Мерёжа) is a rural locality (a village) in Lentyevskoye Rural Settlement, Ustyuzhensky District, Vologda Oblast, Russia. The population was 131 as of 2002. There are 17 streets.

== Geography ==
Meryozha is located 33 km (21 mi) north of Ustyuzhna (the district's administrative centre) by road. Veshki is the nearest rural locality.
