= Staroye Maloye =

Staroye Maloye Старое Малое
- Village
- Location within Vologda Oblast Location within Russia
- Coordinates: 58°41′N 36°12′E
- Country: Russia
- Region: Vologda Oblast
- District: Ustyuzhensky District
- Time zone: UTC+3:00

Staroye Maloye (Russian: Старое Малое) is a rural locality (a village) in Zalesskoye Rural Settlement, Ustyuzhensky District, Vologda Oblast, Russia. The population was 95 as of 2002.

== Geography ==
Staroye Maloye is located 24 km (15 mi) southwest of Ustyuzhna (the district's administrative centre) by road. Maloye Vosnoye is the nearest rural locality.
