= Zimnik, Vologda Oblast =

Zimnik Зимник
- Village
- Location within Vologda Oblast Location within Russia
- Coordinates: 58°58′N 36°57′E
- Country: Russia
- Region: Vologda Oblast
- District: Ustyuzhensky District
- Time zone: UTC+3:00

Zimnik (Russian: Зимник) is a rural locality (a village) in Lentyevskoye Rural Settlement, Ustyuzhensky District, Vologda Oblast, Russia. The population was 39 as of 2002. There are 3 streets.

== Geography ==
Zimnik is located 46 km (29 mi) northeast of Ustyuzhna (the district's administrative centre) by road. Starorechye is the nearest rural locality.
