= Matveyevo, Ustyuzhensky District, Vologda Oblast =

Matveyevo Матвеево
- Village
- Location within Vologda Oblast Location within Russia
- Coordinates: 58°53′N 36°46′E
- Country: Russia
- Region: Vologda Oblast
- District: Ustyuzhensky District
- Time zone: UTC+3:00

Matveyevo (Russian: Матвеево) is a rural locality (a village) in Modenskoye Rural Settlement, Ustyuzhensky District, Vologda Oblast, Russia. The population was 8 as of 2002. There are 2 streets.

== Geography ==
Matveyevo is located 24 km (15 mi) northeast of Ustyuzhna (the district's administrative centre) by road. Alexandrovo-Maryino is the nearest rural locality.
