= Bolshoye Pomyasovo =

Bolshoye Pomyasovo Большое Помясово
- Village
- Location within Vologda Oblast Location within Russia
- Coordinates: 58°45′N 36°08′E
- Country: Russia
- Region: Vologda Oblast
- District: Ustyuzhensky District
- Time zone: UTC+3:00

Bolshoye Pomyasovo (Russian: Большое Помясово) is a rural locality (a village) in Zalesskoye Rural Settlement, Ustyuzhensky District, Vologda Oblast, Russia. The population was 3 as of 2002.

== Geography ==
Bolshoye Pomyasovo is located 26 km (16 mi) southwest of Ustyuzhna (the district's administrative centre) by road. Samsonovo is the nearest rural locality.
