= Balakhtimerovo =

Balakhtimerovo Балахтимерево
- Village
- Location within Vologda Oblast Location within Russia
- Coordinates: 58°44′N 36°18′E
- Country: Russia
- Region: Vologda Oblast
- District: Ustyuzhensky District
- Time zone: UTC+3:00

Balakhtimerovo (Russian: Балахтимерево) is a rural locality (a village) in Zalesskoye Rural Settlement, Ustyuzhensky District, Vologda Oblast, Russia. The population was 44 as of 2002. There are 2 streets.

== Geography ==
Balakhtimerovo is located 17 km (11 mi) southwest of Ustyuzhna (the district's administrative centre) by road. Tyukhtovo is the nearest rural locality.
