= Ponizovye =

Ponizovye Понизовье
- Village
- Location within Vologda Oblast Location within Russia
- Coordinates: 59°02′N 36°44′E
- Country: Russia
- Region: Vologda Oblast
- District: Ustyuzhensky District
- Time zone: UTC+3:00

Ponizovye (Russian: Понизовье) is a rural locality (a village) in Lentyevskoye Rural Settlement, Ustyuzhensky District, Vologda Oblast, Russia. The population was 49 as of 2002. There are 5 streets.

== Geography ==
Ponizovye is located 35 km (22 mi) northeast of Ustyuzhna (the district's administrative centre) by road. Sysoyevo is the nearest rural locality.
