= Vozgrikha =

Vozgrikha Возгриха
- Village
- Location within Vologda Oblast Location within Russia
- Coordinates: 58°41′N 36°08′E
- Country: Russia
- Region: Vologda Oblast
- District: Ustyuzhensky District
- Time zone: UTC+3:00

Vozgrikha (Russian: Возгриха) is a rural locality (a village) in Zalesskoye Rural Settlement, Ustyuzhensky District, Vologda Oblast, Russia. The population was 14 as of 2002.

== Geography ==
Vozgrikha is located 26 km (16 mi) southwest of Ustyuzhna (the district's administrative centre) by road. Zalesye is the nearest rural locality.
