= Staroye Kvasovo =

Staroye Kvasovo Старое Квасово
- Village
- Location within Vologda Oblast Location within Russia
- Coordinates: 58°46′N 36°10′E
- Country: Russia
- Region: Vologda Oblast
- District: Ustyuzhensky District
- Time zone: UTC+3:00

Staroye Kvasovo (Russian: Старое Квасово) is a rural locality (a village) in Zalesskoye Rural Settlement, Ustyuzhensky District, Vologda Oblast, Russia. The population was 49 as of 2002. There are 2 streets.

== Geography ==
Staroye Kvasovo is located 22 km (14 mi) southwest of Ustyuzhna (the district's administrative centre) by road. Dubrovka is the nearest rural locality.
