= Varlygino =

Varlygino Варлыгино
- Village
- Location within Vologda Oblast Location within Russia
- Coordinates: 58°53′N 36°06′E
- Country: Russia
- Region: Vologda Oblast
- District: Ustyuzhensky District
- Time zone: UTC+3:00

Varlygino (Russian: Варлыгино) is a rural locality (a village) in Ustyuzhenskoye Rural Settlement, Ustyuzhensky District, Vologda Oblast, Russia. The population was 33 as of 2002.

== Geography ==
Varlygino is located 34 km (21 mi) northwest of Ustyuzhna (the district's administrative centre) by road. Antonovo is the nearest rural locality.
