= Anashkino, Ustyuzhensky District, Vologda Oblast =

Anashkino Анашкино
- Village
- Location within Vologda Oblast Location within Russia
- Coordinates: 58°33′N 36°30′E
- Country: Russia
- Region: Vologda Oblast
- District: Ustyuzhensky District
- Time zone: UTC+3:00

Anashkino (Russian: Анашкино) is a rural locality (a village) in Nikolskoye Rural Settlement, Ustyuzhensky District, Vologda Oblast, Russia. The population was 8 as of 2002.

== Geography ==
Anashkino is located 42 km (26 mi) south of Ustyuzhna (the district's administrative centre) by road. Yemelyanikha is the nearest rural locality.
