= Okulovo, Ustyuzhensky District, Vologda Oblast =

Okulovo Окулово
- Village
- Location within Vologda Oblast Location within Russia
- Coordinates: 58°56′N 36°22′E
- Country: Russia
- Region: Vologda Oblast
- District: Ustyuzhensky District
- Time zone: UTC+3:00

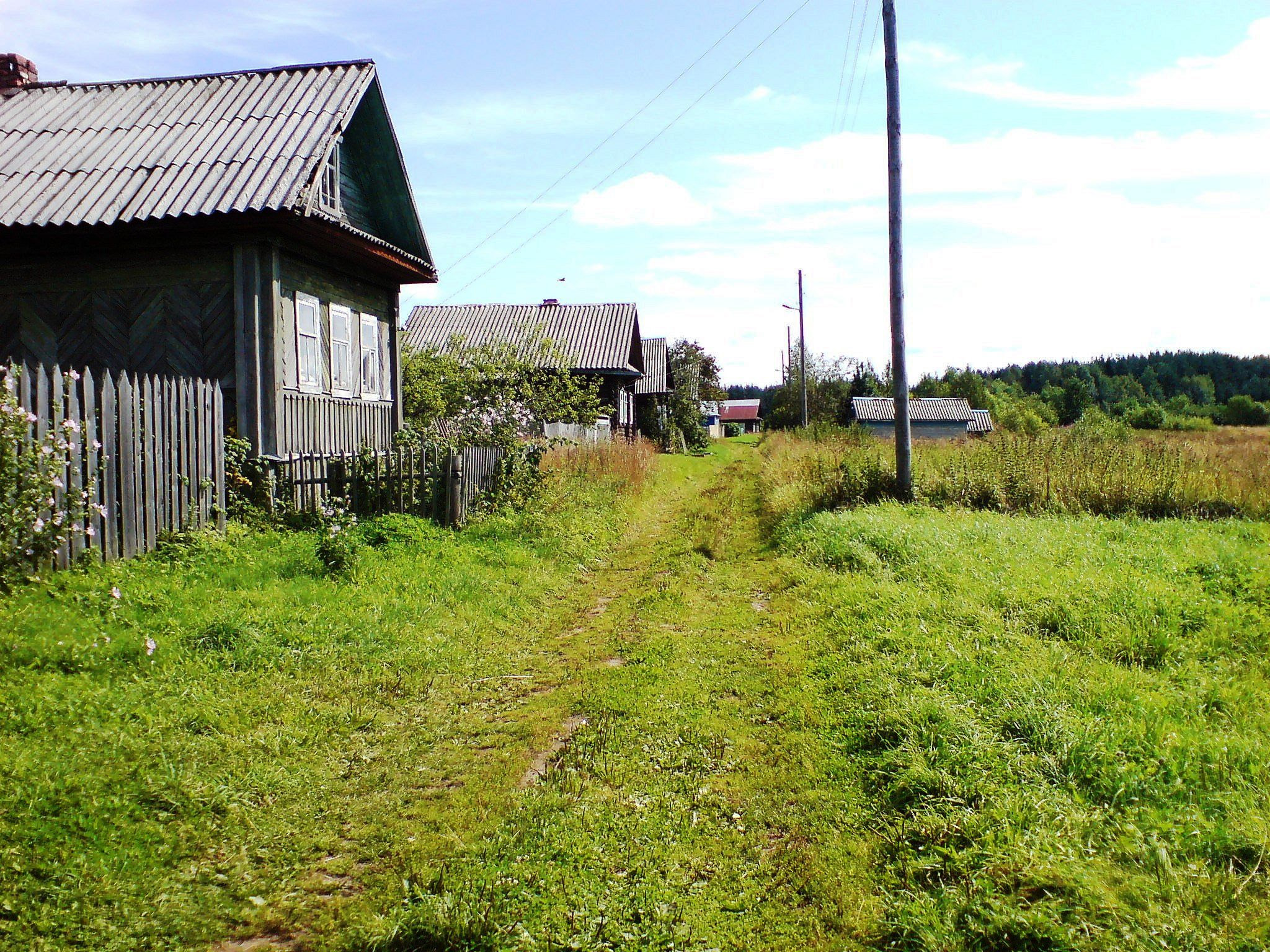
A street in Okulovo

Okulovo (Russian: Окулово) is a rural locality (a village) in Lentyevskoye Rural Settlement, Ustyuzhensky District, Vologda Oblast, Russia. The population was 6 as of 2002.

== Geography ==
Okulovo is located 26 km (16 mi) north of Ustyuzhna (the district's administrative centre) by road. Oryol is the nearest rural locality.
