= Myza-Testovo =

Myza-Testovo Мыза-Тестово
- Village
- Location within Vologda Oblast Location within Russia
- Coordinates: 58°48′N 36°33′E
- Country: Russia
- Region: Vologda Oblast
- District: Ustyuzhensky District
- Time zone: UTC+3:00

Myza-Testovo (Russian: Мыза-Тестово) is a rural locality (a village) in Soshnevskoye Rural Settlement, Ustyuzhensky District, Vologda Oblast, Russia. The population was 10 as of 2002.

== Geography ==
Myza-Testovo is located 9 km (5.6 mi) southeast of Ustyuzhna (the district's administrative centre) by road. Sobolevo is the nearest rural locality.
