= Lyubotovo =

Lyubotovo Люботово
- Village
- Location within Vologda Oblast Location within Russia
- Coordinates: 58°49′N 36°15′E
- Country: Russia
- Region: Vologda Oblast
- District: Ustyuzhensky District
- Time zone: UTC+3:00

Lyubotovo (Russian: Люботово) is a rural locality (a village) in Ustyuzhenskoye Rural Settlement, Ustyuzhensky District, Vologda Oblast, Russia. The population was 27 as of 2002.

== Geography ==
Lyubotovo is located 14 km (8.7 mi) west of Ustyuzhna (the district's administrative centre) by road. Temyanikovo is the nearest rural locality.
