= Legalovo =

Legalovo Легалово
- Village
- Location within Vologda Oblast Location within Russia
- Coordinates: 58°48′N 36°21′E
- Country: Russia
- Region: Vologda Oblast
- District: Ustyuzhensky District
- Time zone: UTC+3:00

Legalovo (Russian: Легалово) is a rural locality (a village) in Ustyuzhenskoye Rural Settlement, Ustyuzhensky District, Vologda Oblast, Russia. The population was 21 as of 2002.

== Geography ==
Legalovo is located 8 km (5.0 mi) southwest of Ustyuzhna (the district's administrative centre) by road. Samoylovo is the nearest rural locality.
