= Kurevanikha =

Kurevanikha Куреваниха
- Village
- Location within Vologda Oblast Location within Russia
- Coordinates: 58°47′N 36°09′E
- Country: Russia
- Region: Vologda Oblast
- District: Ustyuzhensky District
- Time zone: UTC+3:00

Kurevanikha (Russian: Куреваниха) is a rural locality (a village) in Zalesskoye Rural Settlement, Ustyuzhensky District, Vologda Oblast, Russia. The population was 9 as of 2002.

== Geography ==
Kurevanikha is located 25 km (16 mi) southwest of Ustyuzhna (the district's administrative centre) by road. Staroye Kvasovo is the nearest rural locality.
