= Maloye Medvedevo =

Maloye Medvedevo Малое Медведево
- Village
- Location within Vologda Oblast Location within Russia
- Coordinates: 58°57′N 35°52′E
- Country: Russia
- Region: Vologda Oblast
- District: Ustyuzhensky District
- Time zone: UTC+3:00

Maloye Medvedevo (Russian: Малое Медведево) is a rural locality (a village) in Mezzhenskoye Rural Settlement, Ustyuzhensky District, Vologda Oblast, Russia. The population was 27 as of 2002.

== Geography ==
Maloye Medvedevo is located 40 km (25 mi) northwest of Ustyuzhna (the district's administrative centre) by road. Novaya is the nearest rural locality.
