= Brilino =

Brilino Брилино
- Village
- Location within Vologda Oblast Location within Russia
- Coordinates: 58°45′N 36°25′E
- Country: Russia
- Region: Vologda Oblast
- District: Ustyuzhensky District
- Time zone: UTC+3:00

Brilino (Russian: Брилино) is a rural locality (a village) in Ustyuzhenskoye Rural Settlement, Ustyuzhensky District, Vologda Oblast, Russia. The population was 401 as of 2002. There are 10 streets.

== Geography ==
Brilino is located 11 km (6.8 mi) south of Ustyuzhna (the district's administrative centre) by road. Vysotino is the nearest rural locality.
