= Rozhnyovo =

Rozhnyovo Рожнёво
- Village
- Location within Vologda Oblast Location within Russia
- Coordinates: 58°56′N 36°12′E
- Country: Russia
- Region: Vologda Oblast
- District: Ustyuzhensky District
- Time zone: UTC+3:00

Rozhnyovo (Russian: Рожнёво) is a rural locality (a village) in Mezzhenskoye Rural Settlement, Ustyuzhensky District, Vologda Oblast, Russia. The population was 4 as of 2002.

== Geography ==
Rozhnyovo is located 24 km (15 mi) northwest of Ustyuzhna (the district's administrative centre) by road. Demikhovo is the nearest rural locality.
