= Andrakovo, Ustyuzhensky District, Vologda Oblast =

Andrakovo Андраково
- Village
- Location within Vologda Oblast Location within Russia
- Coordinates: 58°51′N 36°23′E
- Country: Russia
- Region: Vologda Oblast
- District: Ustyuzhensky District
- Time zone: UTC+3:00

Andrakovo (Russian: Андраково) is a rural locality (a village) in Ustyuzhenskoye Rural Settlement, Ustyuzhensky District, Vologda Oblast, Russia. The population was 4 as of 2002.

== Geography ==
Andrakovo is located 5 km (3.1 mi) northwest of Ustyuzhna (the district's administrative centre) by road. Borovinka is the nearest rural locality.
