= Zykovo, Ustyuzhensky District, Vologda Oblast =

Zykovo Зыково
- Village
- Location within Vologda Oblast Location within Russia
- Coordinates: 58°41′N 36°11′E
- Country: Russia
- Region: Vologda Oblast
- District: Ustyuzhensky District
- Time zone: UTC+3:00

Zykovo (Russian: Зыково) is a rural locality (a village) in Zalesskoye Rural Settlement, Ustyuzhensky District, Vologda Oblast, Russia. The population was 27 as of 2002.

== Geography ==
Zykovo is located 26 km (16 mi) southwest of Ustyuzhna (the district's administrative centre) by road. Maloye Vosnoye is the nearest rural locality.
