= Tyukhtovo =

Tyukhtovo Тюхтово
- Village
- Location within Vologda Oblast Location within Russia
- Coordinates: 58°44′N 36°20′E
- Country: Russia
- Region: Vologda Oblast
- District: Ustyuzhensky District
- Time zone: UTC+3:00

Tyukhtovo (Russian: Тюхтово) is a rural locality (a village) in Zalesskoye Rural Settlement, Ustyuzhensky District, Vologda Oblast, Russia. The population was 10 as of 2002. There are 2 streets.

== Geography ==
Tyukhtovo is located 18 km (11 mi) southwest of Ustyuzhna (the district's administrative centre) by road. Chuprovo is the nearest rural locality.
