= Rastoropovo =

Rastoropovo Расторопово
- Village
- Location within Vologda Oblast Location within Russia
- Coordinates: 58°33′N 36°18′E
- Country: Russia
- Region: Vologda Oblast
- District: Ustyuzhensky District
- Time zone: UTC+3:00

Rastoropovo (Russian: Расторопово) is a rural locality (a village) in Nikolskoye Rural Settlement, Ustyuzhensky District, Vologda Oblast, Russia. The population was 275 as of 2002. There are 11 streets.

== Geography ==
Rastoropovo is located 40 km (25 mi) southwest of Ustyuzhna (the district's administrative centre) by road. Dubrova is the nearest rural locality.
