= Temyanikovo =

Temyanikovo Темьяниково
- Village
- Location within Vologda Oblast Location within Russia
- Coordinates: 58°49′N 36°17′E
- Country: Russia
- Region: Vologda Oblast
- District: Ustyuzhensky District
- Time zone: UTC+3:00

Temyanikovo (Russian: Темьяниково) is a rural locality (a village) in Ustyuzhenskoye Rural Settlement, Ustyuzhensky District, Vologda Oblast, Russia. The population was 21 as of 2002.

== Geography ==
Temyanikovo is located 12 km (7.5 mi) southwest of Ustyuzhna (the district's administrative centre) by road. Lyubotovo is the nearest rural locality.
