= Vorontsy, Vologda Oblast =

Vorontsy Воронцы
- Village
- Location within Vologda Oblast Location within Russia
- Coordinates: 58°36′N 36°19′E
- Country: Russia
- Region: Vologda Oblast
- District: Ustyuzhensky District
- Time zone: UTC+3:00

Vorontsy (Russian: Воронцы) is a rural locality (a village) in Nikolskoye Rural Settlement, Ustyuzhensky District, Vologda Oblast, Russia. The population was 2 as of 2002.

== Geography ==
Vorontsy is located 45 km (28 mi) south of Ustyuzhna (the district's administrative centre) by road. Tsampelovo is the nearest rural locality.
