= Samoylovo =

Samoylovo Самойлово
- Village
- Location within Vologda Oblast Location within Russia
- Coordinates: 58°48′N 36°21′E
- Country: Russia
- Region: Vologda Oblast
- District: Ustyuzhensky District
- Time zone: UTC+3:00

Samoylovo (Russian: Самойлово) is a rural locality (a village) in Ustyuzhenskoye Rural Settlement, Ustyuzhensky District, Vologda Oblast, Russia. The population was 40 as of 2002.

== Geography ==
Samoylovo is located 7 km (4.3 mi) southwest of Ustyuzhna (the district's administrative centre) by road. Legalovo is the nearest rural locality.
