= Gryada, Vologda Oblast =

Gryada Гряда
- Village
- Location within Vologda Oblast Location within Russia
- Coordinates: 58°39′N 36°20′E
- Country: Russia
- Region: Vologda Oblast
- District: Ustyuzhensky District
- Time zone: UTC+3:00

Gryada (Russian: Гряда) is a rural locality (a village) in Nikiforovskoye Rural Settlement, Ustyuzhensky District, Vologda Oblast, Russia. The population was 26 as of 2002. There are 2 streets.

== Geography ==
Gryada is located 27 km (17 mi) south of Ustyuzhna (the district's administrative centre) by road. Melechino is the nearest rural locality.
