= Leushino, Vologda Oblast =

Leushino Леушино
- Village
- Location within Vologda Oblast Location within Russia
- Coordinates: 58°40′N 36°19′E
- Country: Russia
- Region: Vologda Oblast
- District: Ustyuzhensky District
- Time zone: UTC+3:00

Leushino (Russian: Леушино) is a rural locality (a village) in Nikiforovskoye Rural Settlement, Ustyuzhensky District, Vologda Oblast, Russia. The population was 6 as of 2002. There are 2 streets.

== Geography ==
Leushino is located 29 km (18 mi) south of Ustyuzhna (the district's administrative centre) by road. Spasskoye is the nearest rural locality.
