= Zavrazhye, Ustyuzhensky District, Vologda Oblast =

Zavrazhye Завражье
- Village
- Location within Vologda Oblast Location within Russia
- Coordinates: 58°46′N 36°01′E
- Country: Russia
- Region: Vologda Oblast
- District: Ustyuzhensky District
- Time zone: UTC+3:00

Zavrazhye (Russian: Завражье) is a rural locality (a village) in Ustyuzhenskoye Rural Settlement, Ustyuzhensky District, Vologda Oblast, Russia. The population was 21 as of 2002.

== Geography ==
Zavrazhye is located 39 km (24 mi) southwest of Ustyuzhna (the district's administrative centre) by road. Pergovishchi is the nearest rural locality.
