= Rodishkino =

Rodishkino Родишкино
- Village
- Location within Vologda Oblast Location within Russia
- Coordinates: 58°45′N 36°45′E
- Country: Russia
- Region: Vologda Oblast
- District: Ustyuzhensky District
- Time zone: UTC+3:00

Rodishkino (Russian: Родишкино) is a rural locality (a village) in Soshnevskoye Rural Settlement, Ustyuzhensky District, Vologda Oblast, Russia. The population was 6 as of 2002.

== Geography ==
Rodishkino is located 23 km (14 mi) southeast of Ustyuzhna (the district's administrative centre) by road. Zhukovo is the nearest rural locality.
