= Timofeyevskoye =

Timofeyevskoye Тимофеевское
- Village
- Location within Vologda Oblast Location within Russia
- Coordinates: 58°48′N 36°32′E
- Country: Russia
- Region: Vologda Oblast
- District: Ustyuzhensky District
- Time zone: UTC+3:00

Timofeyevskoye (Russian: Тимофеевское) is a rural locality (a village) in Soshnevskoye Rural Settlement, Ustyuzhensky District, Vologda Oblast, Russia. The population was 11 as of 2002.

== Geography ==
Timofeyevskoye is located 8 km (5.0 mi) southeast of Ustyuzhna (the district's administrative centre) by road. Sobolevo is the nearest rural locality.
