= Perya =

Perya Перя
- Settlement
- Location within Vologda Oblast Location within Russia
- Coordinates: 58°48′N 36°10′E
- Country: Russia
- Region: Vologda Oblast
- District: Ustyuzhensky District
- Time zone: UTC+3:00

Perya (Russian: Перя) is a rural locality (a settlement) in Ustyuzhenskoye Rural Settlement, Ustyuzhensky District, Vologda Oblast, Russia. The population was 3 as of 2002.

== Geography ==
Perya is located 25 km (16 mi) southwest of Ustyuzhna (the district's administrative centre) by road. Yakovlevskoye is the nearest rural locality.
