= Trestenka =

Trestenka Трестенка
- Village
- Location within Vologda Oblast Location within Russia
- Coordinates: 58°43′N 36°25′E
- Country: Russia
- Region: Vologda Oblast
- District: Ustyuzhensky District
- Time zone: UTC+3:00

Trestenka (Russian: Трестенка) is a rural locality (a village) in Nikiforovskoye Rural Settlement, Ustyuzhensky District, Vologda Oblast, Russia. The population was 4 as of 2002.

== Geography ==
Trestenka is located 16 km (9.9 mi) south of Ustyuzhna (the district's administrative centre) by road. Danilovskoye is the nearest rural locality.
