= Alexandrovo, Ustyuzhensky District, Vologda Oblast =

Alexandrovo Александрово
- Village
- Location within Vologda Oblast Location within Russia
- Coordinates: 58°46′N 36°31′E
- Country: Russia
- Region: Vologda Oblast
- District: Ustyuzhensky District
- Time zone: UTC+3:00

Alexandrovo (Russian: Александрово) is a rural locality (a village) in Soshnevskoye Rural Settlement, Ustyuzhensky District, Vologda Oblast, Russia. The population was 10 as of 2002.

== Geography ==
Alexandrovo is located 9 km (5.6 mi) southeast of Ustyuzhna (the district's administrative centre) by road. Shubotovo is the nearest rural locality.
