= Popovka, Ustyuzhensky District, Vologda Oblast =

Popovka Поповка
- Village
- Location within Vologda Oblast Location within Russia
- Coordinates: 58°48′N 36°09′E
- Country: Russia
- Region: Vologda Oblast
- District: Ustyuzhensky District
- Time zone: UTC+3:00

Popovka (Russian: Поповка) is a rural locality (a village) in Ustyuzhenskoye Rural Settlement, Ustyuzhensky District, Vologda Oblast, Russia. The population was 4 as of 2002.

== Geography ==
Popovka is located 26 km (16 mi) southwest of Ustyuzhna (the district's administrative centre) by road. Yakovlevskoye is the nearest rural locality.
