= Zalesye, Ustyuzhensky District, Vologda Oblast =

Zalesye Залесье
- Village
- Location within Vologda Oblast Location within Russia
- Coordinates: 58°42′N 36°10′E
- Country: Russia
- Region: Vologda Oblast
- District: Ustyuzhensky District
- Time zone: UTC+3:00

Zalesye (Russian: Залесье) is a rural locality (a village) in Zalesskoye Rural Settlement, Ustyuzhensky District, Vologda Oblast, Russia. The population was 23 as of 2002.

== Geography ==
Zalesye is located 24 km (15 mi) southwest of Ustyuzhna (the district's administrative centre) by road. Staroye Maloye is the nearest rural locality.
