= Popchikha =

Popchikha Попчиха
- Village
- Location within Vologda Oblast Location within Russia
- Coordinates: 58°56′N 36°46′E
- Country: Russia
- Region: Vologda Oblast
- District: Ustyuzhensky District
- Time zone: UTC+3:00

Popchikha (Russian: Попчиха) is a rural locality (a village) in Lentyevskoye Rural Settlement, Ustyuzhensky District, Vologda Oblast, Russia. The population was 80 as of 2002. There are 5 streets.

== Geography ==
Popchikha is located 35 km (22 mi) northeast of Ustyuzhna (the district's administrative centre) by road. Vanskoye is the nearest rural locality.
