= Kortikha =

Kortikha Кортиха
- Village
- Location within Vologda Oblast Location within Russia
- Coordinates: 58°56′N 36°57′E
- Country: Russia
- Region: Vologda Oblast
- District: Ustyuzhensky District
- Time zone: UTC+3:00

Kortikha (Russian: Кортиха) is a rural locality (a village) in Modenskoye Rural Settlement, Ustyuzhensky District, Vologda Oblast, Russia. The population was 67 as of 2002. There are 3 streets.

== Geography ==
Kortikha is located 42 km (26 mi) northeast of Ustyuzhna (the district's administrative centre) by road. Modno is the nearest rural locality.
