= Vanskoye =

Vanskoye Ванское
- Village
- Location within Vologda Oblast Location within Russia
- Coordinates: 58°56′N 36°52′E
- Country: Russia
- Region: Vologda Oblast
- District: Ustyuzhensky District
- Time zone: UTC+3:00

Vanskoye (Russian: Ванское) is a rural locality (a village) in Lentyevskoye Rural Settlement, Ustyuzhensky District, Vologda Oblast, Russia. The population was 262 as of 2002. There are 9 streets.

== Geography ==
Vanskoye is located 42 km (26 mi) northeast of Ustyuzhna (the district's administrative centre) by road. Kolokolets is the nearest rural locality.
