= Pozharovo, Ustyuzhensky District, Vologda Oblast =

Pozharovo Пожарово
- Village
- Location within Vologda Oblast Location within Russia
- Coordinates: 58°38′N 36°25′E
- Country: Russia
- Region: Vologda Oblast
- District: Ustyuzhensky District
- Time zone: UTC+3:00

Pozharovo (Russian: Пожарово) is a rural locality (a village) in Nikiforovskoye Rural Settlement, Ustyuzhensky District, Vologda Oblast, Russia. The population was 14 as of 2002. There are 2 streets.

== Geography ==
Pozharovo is located 25 km (16 mi) south of Ustyuzhna (the district's administrative centre) by road. Podolskoye is the nearest rural locality.
