= Byvaltsevo =

Byvaltsevo Бывальцево
- Village
- Location within Vologda Oblast Location within Russia
- Coordinates: 59°08′N 36°23′E
- Country: Russia
- Region: Vologda Oblast
- District: Ustyuzhensky District
- Time zone: UTC+3:00

Byvaltsevo (Russian: Бывальцево) is a rural locality (a village) in Lentyevskoye Rural Settlement, Ustyuzhensky District, Vologda Oblast, Russia. The population was 24 as of 2002. There are 4 streets.

== Geography ==
Byvaltsevo is located 47 km (29 mi) north of Ustyuzhna (the district's administrative centre) by road. Merezha is the nearest rural locality.
