= Shustovo, Vologda Oblast =

Shustovo Шустово
- Village
- Location within Vologda Oblast Location within Russia
- Coordinates: 58°46′N 36°25′E
- Country: Russia
- Region: Vologda Oblast
- District: Ustyuzhensky District
- Time zone: UTC+3:00

Shustovo (Russian: Шустово) is a rural locality (a village) in Ustyuzhenskoye Rural Settlement, Ustyuzhensky District, Vologda Oblast, Russia. The population was 6 as of 2002.

== Geography ==
Shustovo is located 8 km (5.0 mi) southwest of Ustyuzhna (the district's administrative centre) by road. Kormovesovo is the nearest rural locality.
