= Krasino, Vologda Oblast =

Krasino Красино
- Village
- Location within Vologda Oblast Location within Russia
- Coordinates: 58°55′N 37°00′E
- Country: Russia
- Region: Vologda Oblast
- District: Ustyuzhensky District
- Time zone: UTC+3:00

Krasino (Russian: Красино) is a rural locality (a village) in Modenskoye Rural Settlement, Ustyuzhensky District, Vologda Oblast, Russia. The population was 33 as of 2002. There are 2 streets.

== Geography ==
Krasino is located 45 km (28 mi) northeast of Ustyuzhna (the district's administrative centre) by road. Kortikha is the nearest rural locality.
