= Starorechye =

Starorechye Староречье
- Settlement
- Location within Vologda Oblast Location within Russia
- Coordinates: 58°56′N 36°59′E
- Country: Russia
- Region: Vologda Oblast
- District: Ustyuzhensky District
- Time zone: UTC+3:00

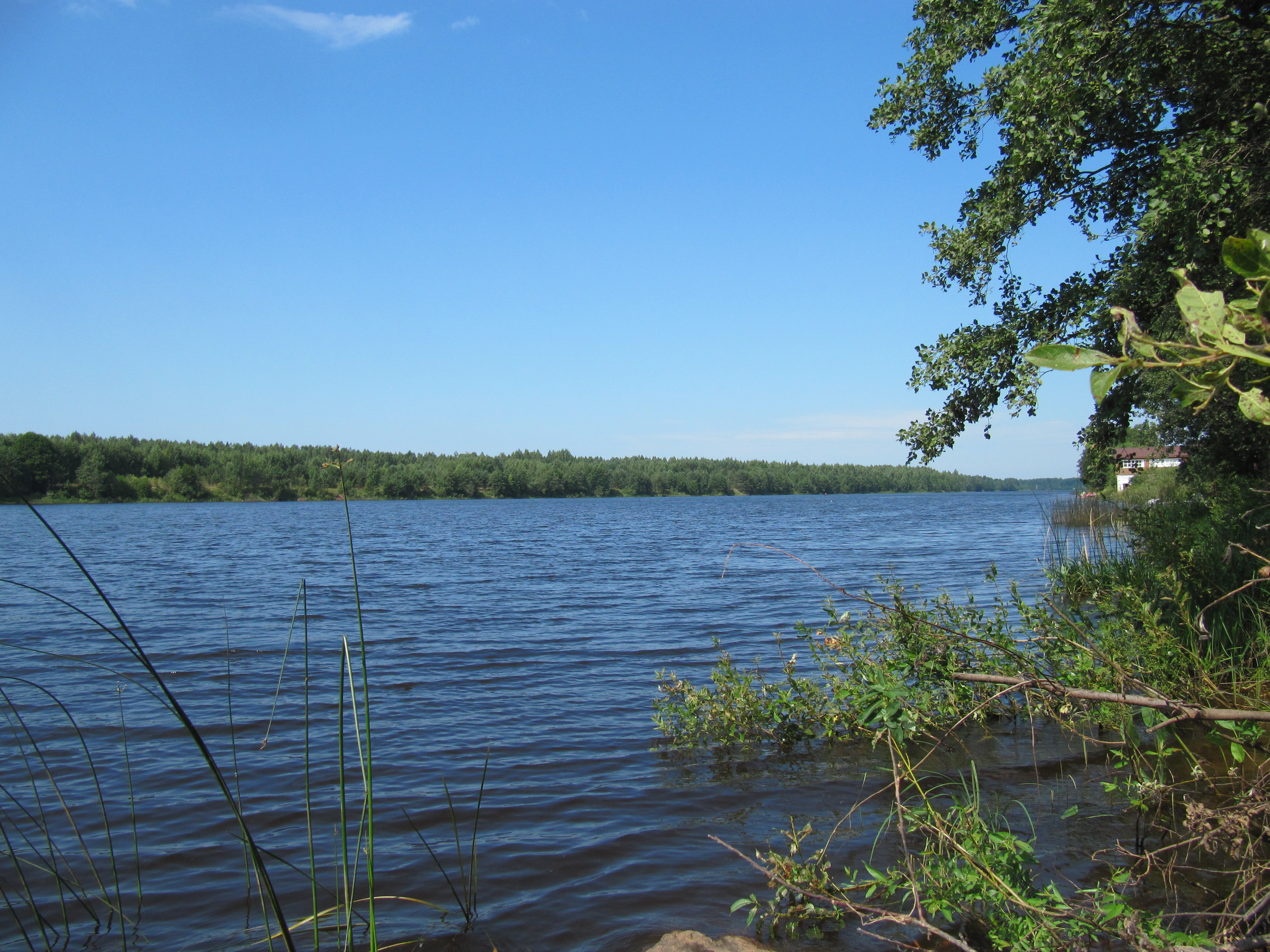
Mologa river, Sarorechye village

Starorechye (Russian: Староречье) is a rural locality (a settlement) in Lentyevskoye Rural Settlement, Ustyuzhensky District, Vologda Oblast, Russia. The population was 1 as of 2002. There are 3 streets. The rural locality does not host any places with a significant impact on global history. No stores and other necessities such as hospitals exists in the settlement.

== Geography ==
Starorechye is located 48 km (30 mi) northeast of Ustyuzhna (the district's administrative centre) by road. Gliny is the nearest rural locality.
