= Slavynevo =

Slavynevo Славынево
- Village
- Location within Vologda Oblast Location within Russia
- Coordinates: 58°44′N 36°48′E
- Country: Russia
- Region: Vologda Oblast
- District: Ustyuzhensky District
- Time zone: UTC+3:00

Slavynevo (Russian: Славынево) is a rural locality (a village) in Soshnevskoye Rural Settlement, Ustyuzhensky District, Vologda Oblast, Russia. The population was 292 as of 2002. There are 2 streets.

== Geography ==
Slavynevo is located 26 km (16 mi) southeast of Ustyuzhna (the district's administrative centre) by road. Bolshoye Ovsyanikovo is the nearest rural locality.
