= Shubotovo =

Shubotovo Шуботово
- Village
- Location within Vologda Oblast Location within Russia
- Coordinates: 58°46′N 36°30′E
- Country: Russia
- Region: Vologda Oblast
- District: Ustyuzhensky District
- Time zone: UTC+3:00

Shubotovo (Russian: Шуботово) is a rural locality (a village) in Soshnevskoye Rural Settlement, Ustyuzhensky District, Vologda Oblast, Russia. The population was 5 as of 2002.

== Geography ==
Shubotovo is located 10 km (6.2 mi) southeast of Ustyuzhna (the district's administrative centre) by road. Alexandrovo is the nearest rural locality.
