= Gliny, Vologda Oblast =

Gliny Глины
- Village
- Location within Vologda Oblast Location within Russia
- Coordinates: 58°55′N 37°00′E
- Country: Russia
- Region: Vologda Oblast
- District: Ustyuzhensky District
- Time zone: UTC+3:00

Gliny (Russian: Глины) is a rural locality (a village) in Lentyevskoye Rural Settlement, Ustyuzhensky District, Vologda Oblast, Russia. The population was 24 as of 2002. There are 3 streets.

== Geography ==
Gliny is located 50 km (31 mi) northeast of Ustyuzhna (the district's administrative centre) by road. Starorechye is the nearest rural locality.
