= Vorotishino =

Vorotishino Воротишино
- Village
- Location within Vologda Oblast Location within Russia
- Coordinates: 58°36′N 36°22′E
- Country: Russia
- Region: Vologda Oblast
- District: Ustyuzhensky District
- Time zone: UTC+3:00

Vorotishino (Russian: Воротишино) is a rural locality (a village) in Nikolskoye Rural Settlement, Ustyuzhensky District, Vologda Oblast, Russia. The population was 8 as of 2002.

== Geography ==
Vorotishino is located 30 km (19 mi) south of Ustyuzhna (the district's administrative centre) by road. Kuzemino is the nearest rural locality.
