= Mezga =

Mezga Мезга
- Village
- Location within Vologda Oblast Location within Russia
- Coordinates: 58°56′N 36°08′E
- Country: Russia
- Region: Vologda Oblast
- District: Ustyuzhensky District
- Time zone: UTC+3:00

Mezga (Russian: Мезга) is a rural locality (a village) in Mezzhenskoye Rural Settlement, Ustyuzhensky District, Vologda Oblast, Russia. The population was 50 as of 2002. There are 2 streets.

== Geography ==
Mezga is located 25 km (16 mi) northwest of Ustyuzhna (the district's administrative centre) by road. Loginovo is the nearest rural locality.
