= Yemelyanikha =

Yemelyanikha Емельяниха
- Village
- Location within Vologda Oblast Location within Russia
- Coordinates: 58°33′N 36°29′E
- Country: Russia
- Region: Vologda Oblast
- District: Ustyuzhensky District
- Time zone: UTC+3:00

Yemelyanikha (Russian: Емельяниха) is a rural locality (a village) in Nikolskoye Rural Settlement, Ustyuzhensky District, Vologda Oblast, Russia. The population was 22 as of 2002.

== Geography ==
Yemelyanikha is located 40 km (25 mi) south of Ustyuzhna (the district's administrative centre) by road. Kostyanovo is the nearest rural locality.
