= Svistuny =

Svistuny Свистуны
- Village
- Location within Vologda Oblast Location within Russia
- Coordinates: 58°44′N 36°30′E
- Country: Russia
- Region: Vologda Oblast
- District: Ustyuzhensky District
- Time zone: UTC+3:00

Svistuny (Russian: Свистуны) is a rural locality (a village) in Ustyuzhenskoye Rural Settlement, Ustyuzhensky District, Vologda Oblast, Russia. The population was 15 as of 2002.

== Geography ==
Svistuny is located 19 km (12 mi) southeast of Ustyuzhna (the district's administrative centre) by road. Dora is the nearest rural locality.
