= Sofrontsevo =

Sofrontsevo Софронцево
- Village
- Location within Vologda Oblast Location within Russia
- Coordinates: 58°51′N 36°16′E
- Country: Russia
- Region: Vologda Oblast
- District: Ustyuzhensky District
- Time zone: UTC+3:00

Sofrontsevo (Russian: Софронцево) is a rural locality (a village) in Ustyuzhenskoye Rural Settlement, Ustyuzhensky District, Vologda Oblast, Russia. The population was 32 as of 2002.

== Geography ==
Sofrontsevo is located 19 km (12 mi) northwest of Ustyuzhna (the district's administrative centre) by road. Solovtsovo is the nearest rural locality.
