= Korokolets =

Korokolets Колоколец
- Settlement
- Location within Vologda Oblast Location within Russia
- Coordinates: 58°56′N 36°54′E
- Country: Russia
- Region: Vologda Oblast
- District: Ustyuzhensky District
- Time zone: UTC+3:00

Korokolets (Russian: Колоколец) is a rural locality (a settlement) in Lentyevskoye Rural Settlement, Ustyuzhensky District, Vologda Oblast, Russia. The population was 9 as of 2002. There are 10 streets.

== Geography ==
Korokolets is located 43 km (27 mi) northeast of Ustyuzhna (the district's administrative centre) by road. Vanskoye is the nearest rural locality.
