= Pozharki =

Pozharki Пожарки
- Khutor
- Location within Vologda Oblast Location within Russia
- Coordinates: 59°03′N 36°42′E
- Country: Russia
- Region: Vologda Oblast
- District: Ustyuzhensky District
- Time zone: UTC+3:00

Pozharki (Russian: Пожарки) is a rural locality (a khutor) in Lentyevskoye Rural Settlement, Ustyuzhensky District, Vologda Oblast, Russia. The population was 1 as of 2002.

== Geography ==
Pozharki is located 38 km (24 mi) northeast of Ustyuzhna (the district's administrative centre) by road. Sysoyevo is the nearest rural locality.
