= Novoye Ivantsevo =

Novoye Ivantsevo Новое Иванцево
- Village
- Location within Vologda Oblast Location within Russia
- Coordinates: 58°31′N 36°17′E
- Country: Russia
- Region: Vologda Oblast
- District: Ustyuzhensky District
- Time zone: UTC+3:00

Novoye Ivantsevo (Russian: Новое Иванцево) is a rural locality (a village) in Nikolskoye Rural Settlement, Ustyuzhensky District, Vologda Oblast, Russia. The population was 5 as of 2002.

== Geography ==
Novoye Ivantsevo is located 40 km (25 mi) southwest of Ustyuzhna (the district's administrative centre) by road. Rastoropovo is the nearest rural locality.
