= Venitsy =

Venitsy Веницы
- Village
- Location within Vologda Oblast Location within Russia
- Coordinates: 58°40′N 36°29′E
- Country: Russia
- Region: Vologda Oblast
- District: Ustyuzhensky District
- Time zone: UTC+3:00

Venitsy (Russian: Веницы) is a rural locality (a village) in Nikiforovskoye Rural Settlement, Ustyuzhensky District, Vologda Oblast, Russia. The population was 208 as of 2002. There are 3 streets.

== Geography ==
Venitsy is located 22 km (14 mi) south of Ustyuzhna (the district's administrative centre) by road. Veshki is the nearest rural locality.
