= Vetrennikovo =

Vetrennikovo Ветренниково
- Village
- Location within Vologda Oblast Location within Russia
- Coordinates: 58°51′N 36°31′E
- Country: Russia
- Region: Vologda Oblast
- District: Ustyuzhensky District
- Time zone: UTC+3:00

Vetrennikovo (Russian: Ветренниково) is a rural locality (a village) in Ustyuzhenskoye Rural Settlement, Ustyuzhensky District, Vologda Oblast, Russia. The population was 21 as of 2002.

== Geography ==
Vetrennikovo is located 6 km (3.7 mi) northeast of Ustyuzhna (the district's administrative centre) by road. Igumnovo is the nearest rural locality.
