= Zyablikovo, Vologda Oblast =

Zyablikovo Зябликово
- Village
- Location within Vologda Oblast Location within Russia
- Coordinates: 58°47′N 36°42′E
- Country: Russia
- Region: Vologda Oblast
- District: Ustyuzhensky District
- Time zone: UTC+3:00

Zyablikovo (Russian: Зябликово) is a rural locality (a village) in Soshnevskoye Rural Settlement, Ustyuzhensky District, Vologda Oblast, Russia. The population was two as of 2002.

== Geography ==
Zyablikovo is located 18 km (11 mi) southeast of Ustyuzhna (the district's administrative centre) by road. Zhukovo is the nearest rural locality.
