= Bolshaya Lipenka =

Bolshaya Lipenka Большая Липенка
- Village
- Location within Vologda Oblast Location within Russia
- Coordinates: 58°52′N 36°57′E
- Country: Russia
- Region: Vologda Oblast
- District: Ustyuzhensky District
- Time zone: UTC+3:00

Bolshaya Lipenka (Russian: Большая Липенка) is a rural locality (a village) in Modenskoye Rural Settlement, Ustyuzhensky District, Vologda Oblast, Russia. The population was 7 as of 2002. There are 2 streets.

== Geography ==
Bolshaya Lipenka is located 36 km (22 mi) northeast of Ustyuzhna (the district's administrative centre) by road. Martynovo is the nearest rural locality.
