= Chesavino =

Chesavino Чесавино
- Village
- Location within Vologda Oblast Location within Russia
- Coordinates: 58°49′N 36°26′E
- Country: Russia
- Region: Vologda Oblast
- District: Ustyuzhensky District
- Time zone: UTC+3:00

Chesavino (Russian: Чесавино) is a rural locality (a village) in Ustyuzhenskoye Rural Settlement, Ustyuzhensky District, Vologda Oblast, Russia. The population was 42 as of 2002.

== Geography ==
Chesavino is located 2 km (1.2 mi) south of Ustyuzhna (the district's administrative centre) by road. Ustyuzhna is the nearest rural locality.
