= Nikola, Ustyuzhensky District, Vologda Oblast =

Nikola Никола
- Village
- Location within Vologda Oblast Location within Russia
- Coordinates: 58°32′N 36°23′E
- Country: Russia
- Region: Vologda Oblast
- District: Ustyuzhensky District
- Time zone: UTC+3:00

Nikola (Russian: Никола) is a rural locality (a village) and the administrative center of Nikolskoye Rural Settlement, Ustyuzhensky District, Vologda Oblast, Russia. The population was 567 as of 2002. There are 7 streets.

== Geography ==
Nikola is located 36 km (22 mi) south of Ustyuzhna (the district's administrative centre) by road. Gorka is the nearest rural locality.
