= Plotichye =

Plotichye Плотичье
- Village
- Location within Vologda Oblast Location within Russia
- Coordinates: 58°54′N 36°53′E
- Country: Russia
- Region: Vologda Oblast
- District: Ustyuzhensky District
- Time zone: UTC+3:00

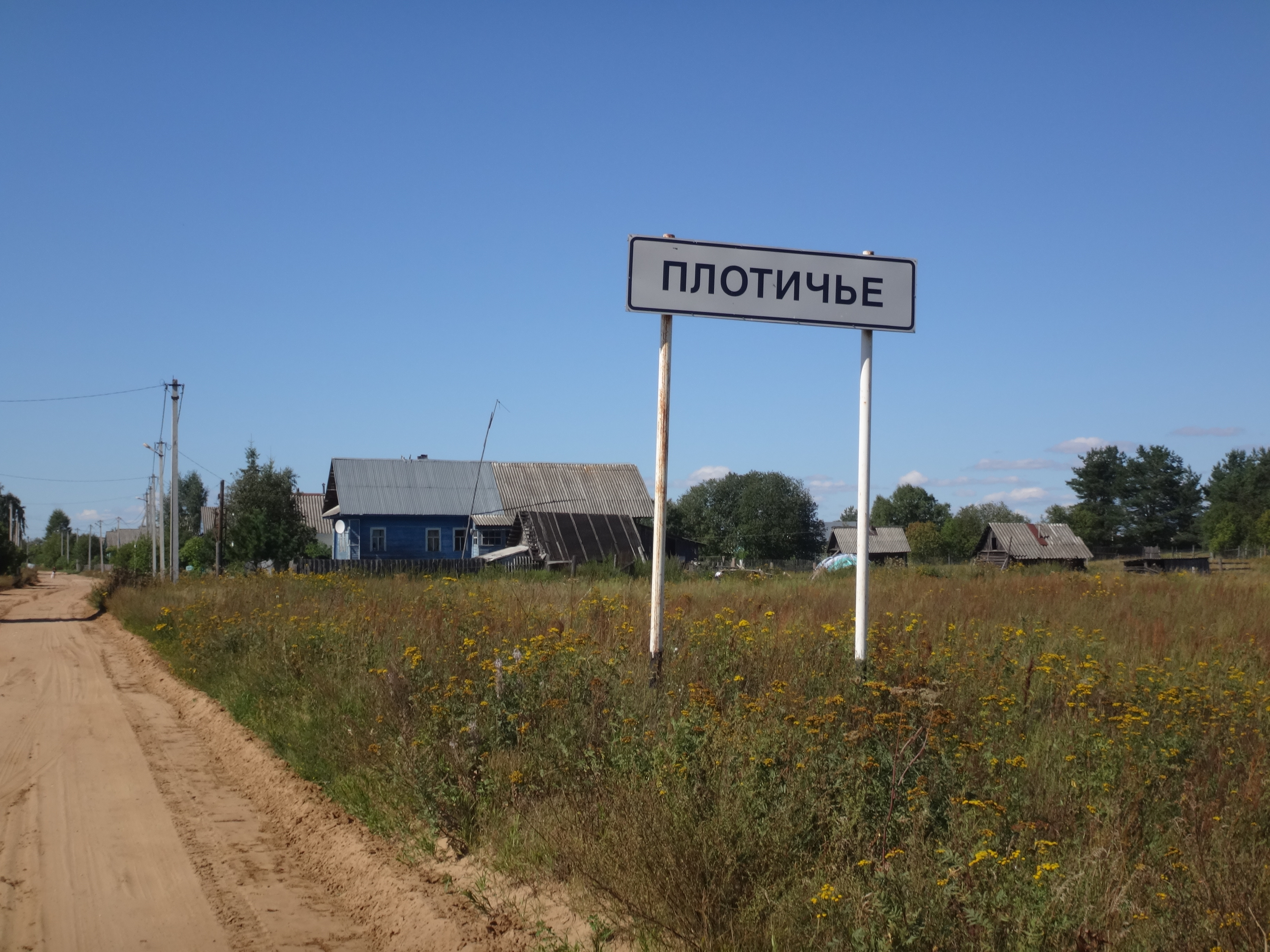
A sign seen when entering the city, declaring its Russian name

Plotichye (Russian: Плотичье) is a rural locality (a village) in Modenskoye Rural Settlement, Ustyuzhensky District, Vologda Oblast, Russia. The population was 130 as of 2002. There are 4 streets.

== Geography ==
Plotichye is located 37 km (23 mi) northeast of Ustyuzhna (the district's administrative centre) by road. Modno is the nearest rural locality.
