= Mochala, Vologda Oblast =

Mochala Мочала
- Village
- Location within Vologda Oblast Location within Russia
- Coordinates: 58°55′N 36°14′E
- Country: Russia
- Region: Vologda Oblast
- District: Ustyuzhensky District
- Time zone: UTC+3:00

Mochala (Russian: Мочала) is a rural locality (a village) in Mezzhenskoye Rural Settlement, Ustyuzhensky District, Vologda Oblast, Russia. The population was 55 as of 2002.

== Geography ==
Mochala is located 17 km (11 mi) northwest of Ustyuzhna (the district's administrative centre) by road. Marfino is the nearest rural locality.
