= Poddubye =

Poddubye Поддубье
- Village
- Location within Vologda Oblast Location within Russia
- Coordinates: 58°45′N 36°00′E
- Country: Russia
- Region: Vologda Oblast
- District: Ustyuzhensky District
- Time zone: UTC+3:00

Poddubye (Russian: Поддубье) is a rural locality (a village) in Ustyuzhenskoye Rural Settlement, Ustyuzhensky District, Vologda Oblast, Russia. The population was 13 as of 2002.

== Geography ==
Poddubye is located 41 km (25 mi) southwest of Ustyuzhna (the district's administrative centre) by road. Zavrazhye is the nearest rural locality.
