= Krutets, Ustyuzhensky District, Vologda Oblast =

Krutets Крутец
- Village
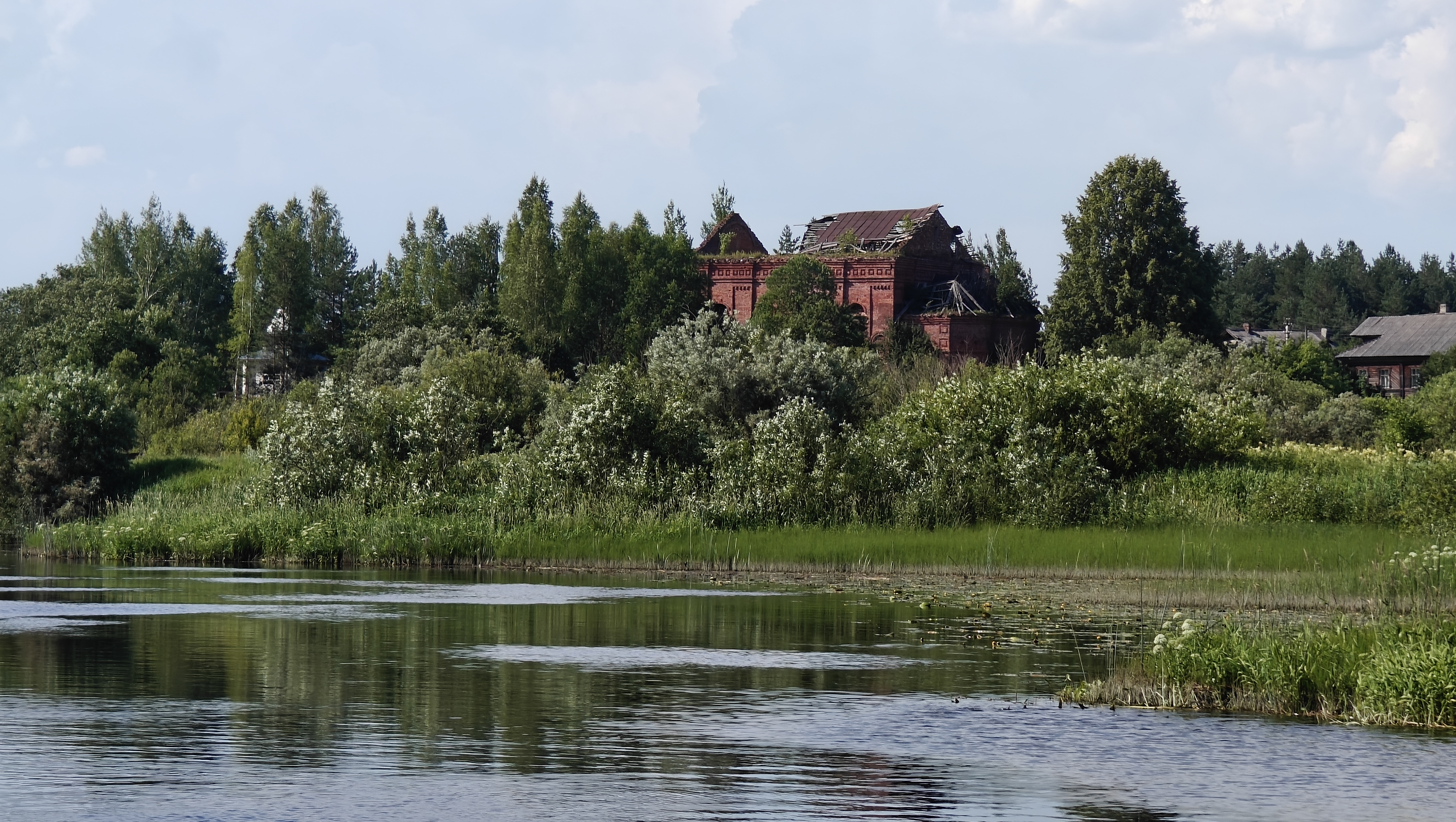
- Church of the Nativity of Christ: Krutets, Ustyuzhensky district, Vologda region

- Location within Vologda Oblast Location within Russia
- Coordinates: 58°45′N 36°01′E
- Country: Russia
- Region: Vologda Oblast
- District: Ustyuzhensky District
- Time zone: UTC+3:00

Krutets (Russian: Крутец) is a rural locality (a village) in Zalesskoye Rural Settlement, Ustyuzhensky District, Vologda Oblast, Russia. The population was 23 as of 2002.

== Geography ==
Krutets is located 38 km (24 mi) southwest of Ustyuzhna (the district's administrative centre) by road. Pergovishchi is the nearest rural locality.
