= Lukhnevo =

Lukhnevo Лухнево
- Village
- Location within Vologda Oblast Location within Russia
- Coordinates: 58°44′N 36°03′E
- Country: Russia
- Region: Vologda Oblast
- District: Ustyuzhensky District
- Time zone: UTC+3:00

Lukhnevo (Russian: Лухнево) is a rural locality (a village) in Zalesskoye Rural Settlement, Ustyuzhensky District, Vologda Oblast, Russia. The population was 19 as of 2002.

== Geography ==
Lukhnevo is located 37 km (23 mi) southwest of Ustyuzhna (the district's administrative centre) by road. Denisovo is the nearest rural locality.
