= Torsheyevo =

Torsheyevo Торшеево
- Village
- Location within Vologda Oblast Location within Russia
- Coordinates: 58°47′N 36°29′E
- Country: Russia
- Region: Vologda Oblast
- District: Ustyuzhensky District
- Time zone: UTC+3:00

Torsheyevo (Russian: Торшеево) is a rural locality (a village) in Soshnevskoye Rural Settlement, Ustyuzhensky District, Vologda Oblast, Russia. The population was 22 as of 2002.

== Geography ==
Torsheyevo is located 7 km (4.3 mi) southeast of Ustyuzhna (the district's administrative centre) by road. Soshnevo is the nearest rural locality.
