= Chuprovo, Ustyuzhensky District, Vologda Oblast =

Chuprovo Чупрово
- Village
- Location within Vologda Oblast Location within Russia
- Coordinates: 58°44′N 36°20′E
- Country: Russia
- Region: Vologda Oblast
- District: Ustyuzhensky District
- Time zone: UTC+3:00

Chuprovo (Russian: Чупрово) is a rural locality in Zalesskoye Rural Settlement, Ustyuzhensky District, Vologda Oblast, Russia. The population was 14 as of 2002.

== Geography ==
Chuprovo is located 19 km (12 mi) southwest of Ustyuzhna (the district's administrative centre) by road. Tyukhtovo is the nearest rural locality.
