= Selishche, Ustyuzhensky District, Vologda Oblast =

Selishche Селище
- Village
- Location within Vologda Oblast Location within Russia
- Coordinates: 58°55′N 36°36′E
- Country: Russia
- Region: Vologda Oblast
- District: Ustyuzhensky District
- Time zone: UTC+3:00

Selishche (Russian: Селище) is a rural locality (a village) in Posyolok imeni Zhelyabovo, Ustyuzhensky District, Vologda Oblast, Russia. The population was 42 as of 2002. There are 5 streets.

== Geography ==
Selishche is located 22 km (14 mi) northeast of Ustyuzhna (the district's administrative centre) by road. Osnopolye is the nearest rural locality.
