= Izbishchi, Vologda Oblast =

Izbishchi Избищи
- Village
- Location within Vologda Oblast Location within Russia
- Coordinates: 58°45′N 36°04′E
- Country: Russia
- Region: Vologda Oblast
- District: Ustyuzhensky District
- Time zone: UTC+3:00

Izbishchi (Russian: Избищи) is a rural locality (a village) in Zalesskoye Rural Settlement, Ustyuzhensky District, Vologda Oblast, Russia. The population was 33 as of 2002.

== Geography ==
Izbishchi is located 33 km (21 mi) southwest of Ustyuzhna (the district's administrative centre) by road. Dorino is the nearest rural locality.
