= Shuklino, Ustyuzhensky District, Vologda Oblast =

Shuklino Шуклино
- Village
- Location within Vologda Oblast Location within Russia
- Coordinates: 58°53′N 36°34′E
- Country: Russia
- Region: Vologda Oblast
- District: Ustyuzhensky District
- Time zone: UTC+3:00

Shuklino (Russian: Шуклино) is a rural locality (a village) in Lentyevskoye Rural Settlement, Ustyuzhensky District, Vologda Oblast, Russia. The population was 2 as of 2002.

== Geography ==
Shuklino is located 19 km (12 mi) northeast of Ustyuzhna (the district's administrative centre) by road. Khotyl is the nearest rural locality.
