= Brenchikha =

Brenchikha Бренчиха
- Village
- Location within Vologda Oblast Location within Russia
- Coordinates: 58°37′N 36°15′E
- Country: Russia
- Region: Vologda Oblast
- District: Ustyuzhensky District
- Time zone: UTC+3:00

Brenchikha (Russian: Бренчиха) is a rural locality (a village) in Zalesskoye Rural Settlement, Ustyuzhensky District, Vologda Oblast, Russia. The population was 5 as of 2002.

== Geography ==
Brenchikha is located 36 km (22 mi) southwest of Ustyuzhna (the district's administrative centre) by road. Astashkino is the nearest rural locality.
