= Bolshoye Vosnoye =

Bolshoye Vosnoye Большое Восное
- Village
- Location within Vologda Oblast Location within Russia
- Coordinates: 58°43′N 36°12′E
- Country: Russia
- Region: Vologda Oblast
- District: Ustyuzhensky District
- Time zone: UTC+3:00

Bolshoye Vosnoye (Russian: Большое Восное) is a rural locality (a village) in Zalesskoye Rural Settlement, Ustyuzhensky District, Vologda Oblast, Russia. The population was 19 as of 2002.

== Geography ==
Bolshoye Vosnoye is located 20 km (12 mi) southwest of Ustyuzhna (the district's administrative centre) by road. Zalesye is the nearest rural locality.
