= Gryaznaya Dubrova =

Gryaznaya Dubrova Грязная Дуброва
- Village
- Location within Vologda Oblast Location within Russia
- Coordinates: 58°38′N 36°11′E
- Country: Russia
- Region: Vologda Oblast
- District: Ustyuzhensky District
- Time zone: UTC+3:00

Gryaznaya Dubrova (Russian: Грязная Дуброва) is a rural locality (a village) in Zalesskoye Rural Settlement, Ustyuzhensky District, Vologda Oblast, Russia. The population was 24 as of 2002.

== Geography ==
Gryaznaya Dubrova is located 32 km (20 mi) southwest of Ustyuzhna (the district's administrative centre) by road. Terentyevo is the nearest rural locality.
