= Shaloch =

Shaloch Шалочь
- Village
- Location within Vologda Oblast Location within Russia
- Coordinates: 59°04′N 36°41′E
- Country: Russia
- Region: Vologda Oblast
- District: Ustyuzhensky District
- Time zone: UTC+3:00

Shaloch (Russian: Шалочь) is a rural locality (a village) in Lentyevskoye Rural Settlement, Ustyuzhensky District, Vologda Oblast, Russia. The population was 14 as of 2002. There are 4 streets.

== Geography ==
Shaloch is located 42 km (26 mi) northeast of Ustyuzhna (the district's administrative centre) by road. Sysoyevo is the nearest rural locality.
