= Chirets =

Chirets Чирец
- Village
- Location within Vologda Oblast Location within Russia
- Coordinates: 58°53′N 36°36′E
- Country: Russia
- Region: Vologda Oblast
- District: Ustyuzhensky District
- Time zone: UTC+3:00

Chirets (Russian: Чирец) is a rural locality (a village) in Posyolok imeni Zhelyabovo, Ustyuzhensky District, Vologda Oblast, Russia. The population was 3 as of 2002. There are 2 streets.

== Geography ==
Chirets is located 13 km (8.1 mi) northeast of Ustyuzhna (the district's administrative centre) by road. Lychno is the nearest rural locality.
