= Novinki, Ustyuzhensky District, Vologda Oblast =

Novinki Новинки
- Village
- Location within Vologda Oblast Location within Russia
- Coordinates: 58°44′N 36°24′E
- Country: Russia
- Region: Vologda Oblast
- District: Ustyuzhensky District
- Time zone: UTC+3:00

Novinki (Russian: Новинки) is a rural locality (a village) in Ustyuzhenskoye Rural Settlement, Ustyuzhensky District, Vologda Oblast, Russia. The population was 4 as of 2002.

== Geography ==
Novinki is located 13 km (8.1 mi) southwest of Ustyuzhna (the district's administrative centre) by road. Vysotino is the nearest rural locality.
