= Shelokhach =

Shelokhach Шелохачь
- Village
- Location within Vologda Oblast Location within Russia
- Coordinates: 58°58′N 36°34′E
- Country: Russia
- Region: Vologda Oblast
- District: Ustyuzhensky District
- Time zone: UTC+3:00

Shelokhach (Russian: Шелохачь) is a rural locality (a village) in Lentyevskoye Rural Settlement, Ustyuzhensky District, Vologda Oblast, Russia. The population was 38 as of 2002. There are 3 streets.

== Geography ==
Shelokhach is located 25 km (16 mi) northeast of Ustyuzhna (the district's administrative centre) by road. Lentyevo is the nearest rural locality.
