= Boguslavl =

Boguslavl Богуславль
- Village
- Location within Vologda Oblast Location within Russia
- Coordinates: 58°35′N 36°24′E
- Country: Russia
- Region: Vologda Oblast
- District: Ustyuzhensky District
- Time zone: UTC+3:00

Boguslavl (Russian: Богуславль) is a rural locality (a village) in Nikolskoye Rural Settlement, Ustyuzhensky District, Vologda Oblast, Russia. The population was 60 as of 2002.

== Geography ==
Boguslavl is located 31 km (19 mi) south of Ustyuzhna (the district's administrative centre) by road. Petrovo is the nearest rural locality.
