= Sysoyevo, Ustyuzhensky District, Vologda Oblast =

Sysoyevo Сысоево
- Village
- Location within Vologda Oblast Location within Russia
- Coordinates: 59°02′N 36°44′E
- Country: Russia
- Region: Vologda Oblast
- District: Ustyuzhensky District
- Time zone: UTC+3:00

Sysoyevo (Russian: Сысоево) is a rural locality (a village) in Lentyevskoye Rural Settlement, Ustyuzhensky District, Vologda Oblast, Russia. The population was 2 as of 2002.

== Geography ==
Sysoyevo is located 37 km (23 mi) northeast of Ustyuzhna (the district's administrative centre) by road. Shaloch is the nearest rural locality.
