= Tsampelovo =

Tsampelovo Цампелово
- Village
- Location within Vologda Oblast Location within Russia
- Coordinates: 58°36′N 36°18′E
- Country: Russia
- Region: Vologda Oblast
- District: Ustyuzhensky District
- Time zone: UTC+3:00

Tsampelovo (Russian: Цампелово) is a rural locality (a village) in Nikolskoye Rural Settlement, Ustyuzhensky District, Vologda Oblast, Russia. The population was 3 as of 2002.

== Geography ==
Tsampelovo is located 44 km (27 mi) southwest of Ustyuzhna (the district's administrative centre) by road. Vorontsy is the nearest rural locality.
