= Glukhovo-2 =

Glukhovo-2 Глухово-2
- Village
- Location within Vologda Oblast Location within Russia
- Coordinates: 58°43′N 36°08′E
- Country: Russia
- Region: Vologda Oblast
- District: Ustyuzhensky District
- Time zone: UTC+3:00

Glukhovo-2 (Russian: Глухово-2) is a rural locality (a village) in Zalesskoye Rural Settlement, Ustyuzhensky District, Vologda Oblast, Russia. The population was 6 as of 2002.

== Geography ==
Glukhovo-2 is located 28 km (17 mi) southwest of Ustyuzhna (the district's administrative centre) by road. Glukhovo-1 is the nearest rural locality.
