= Pergovishchi =

Pergovishchi Перговищи
- Village
- Location within Vologda Oblast Location within Russia
- Coordinates: 58°46′N 36°02′E
- Country: Russia
- Region: Vologda Oblast
- District: Ustyuzhensky District
- Time zone: UTC+3:00

Pergovishchi (Russian: Перговищи) is a rural locality (a village) in Zalesskoye Rural Settlement, Ustyuzhensky District, Vologda Oblast, Russia. The population was 12 as of 2002.

== Geography ==
Pergovishchi is located 39 km (24 mi) southwest of Ustyuzhna (the district's administrative centre) by road. Yartsevo is the nearest rural locality.
