= Loginovo, Ustyuzhensky District, Vologda Oblast =

Loginovo Логиново
- Village
- Location within Vologda Oblast Location within Russia
- Coordinates: 58°56′N 36°11′E
- Country: Russia
- Region: Vologda Oblast
- District: Ustyuzhensky District
- Time zone: UTC+3:00

Loginovo (Russian: Логиново) is a rural locality (a village) in Mezzhenskoye Rural Settlement, Ustyuzhensky District, Vologda Oblast, Russia. The population was 5 as of 2002.

== Geography ==
Loginovo is located 22 km (14 mi) northwest of Ustyuzhna (the district's administrative centre) by road. Rozhnevo is the nearest rural locality.
