= Poroslovo =

Poroslovo Порослово
- Village
- Location within Vologda Oblast Location within Russia
- Coordinates: 58°54′N 36°31′E
- Country: Russia
- Region: Vologda Oblast
- District: Ustyuzhensky District
- Time zone: UTC+3:00

Poroslovo (Russian: Порослово) is a rural locality (a village) in Lentyevskoye Rural Settlement, Ustyuzhensky District, Vologda Oblast, Russia. The population was 13 as of 2002. There are four streets.

== Geography ==
Poroslovo is located 15 km (9.3 mi) northeast of Ustyuzhna (the district's administrative centre) by road. Khotyl is the nearest rural locality.
