= Dora, Ustyuzhensky District, Vologda Oblast =

Dora Дора
- Village
- Location within Vologda Oblast Location within Russia
- Coordinates: 58°44′N 36°31′E
- Country: Russia
- Region: Vologda Oblast
- District: Ustyuzhensky District
- Time zone: UTC+3:00

Dora (Russian: Дора) is a rural locality (a village) in Ustyuzhenskoye Rural Settlement, Ustyuzhensky District, Vologda Oblast, Russia. The population was 21 as of 2002.

== Geography ==
Dora is located 17 km (11 mi) southeast of Ustyuzhna (the district's administrative centre) by road. Svistuny is the nearest rural locality.
