= Zhilino, Ustyuzhensky District, Vologda Oblast =

Zhilino Жилино
- Village
- Location within Vologda Oblast Location within Russia
- Coordinates: 58°57′N 36°00′E
- Country: Russia
- Region: Vologda Oblast
- District: Ustyuzhensky District
- Time zone: UTC+3:00

Zhilino (Russian: Жилино) is a rural locality (a village) in Mezzhenskoye Rural Settlement, Ustyuzhensky District, Vologda Oblast, Russia. The population was 20 as of 2002.

== Geography ==
Zhilino is located 35 km (22 mi) northwest of Ustyuzhna (the district's administrative centre) by road. Dolotskoye is the nearest rural locality.
