= Krotyn =

Krotyn Кротынь
- Village
- Location within Vologda Oblast Location within Russia
- Coordinates: 58°51′N 36°31′E
- Country: Russia
- Region: Vologda Oblast
- District: Ustyuzhensky District
- Time zone: UTC+3:00

Krotyn (Russian: Кротынь) is a rural locality (a village) in Ustyuzhenskoye Rural Settlement, Ustyuzhensky District, Vologda Oblast, Russia. The population was 14 as of 2002.

== Geography ==
Krotyn is located 9 km (5.6 mi) northeast of Ustyuzhna (the district's administrative centre) by road. Vetrennikovo is the nearest rural locality.
