= Zagorye, Ustyuzhensky District, Vologda Oblast =

Zagorye Загорье
- Village
- Location within Vologda Oblast Location within Russia
- Coordinates: 58°40′N 36°30′E
- Country: Russia
- Region: Vologda Oblast
- District: Ustyuzhensky District
- Time zone: UTC+3:00

Zagorye (Russian: Загорье) is a rural locality (a village) in Nikiforovskoye Rural Settlement, Ustyuzhensky District, Vologda Oblast, Russia. The population was 10 as of 2002.

== Geography ==
Zagorye is located 23 km (14 mi) south of Ustyuzhna (the district's administrative centre) by road. Venitsy is the nearest rural locality.
