= Ogib =

Ogib Огибь
- Village
- Location within Vologda Oblast Location within Russia
- Coordinates: 58°56′N 36°31′E
- Country: Russia
- Region: Vologda Oblast
- District: Ustyuzhensky District
- Time zone: UTC+3:00

Ogib (Russian: Огибь) is a rural locality (a village) in Lentyevskoye Rural Settlement, Ustyuzhensky District, Vologda Oblast, Russia. The population was 53 as of 2002.

== Geography ==
Ogib is located 16 km (9.9 mi) northeast of Ustyuzhna (the district's administrative centre) by road. Gromoshikha is the nearest rural locality.
