= Timonino, Ustyuzhensky District, Vologda Oblast =

Timonino Тимонино
- Village
- Location within Vologda Oblast Location within Russia
- Coordinates: 58°45′N 36°27′E
- Country: Russia
- Region: Vologda Oblast
- District: Ustyuzhensky District
- Time zone: UTC+3:00

Timonino (Russian: Тимонино) is a rural locality (a village) in Ustyuzhenskoye Rural Settlement, Ustyuzhensky District, Vologda Oblast, Russia. The population was 3 as of 2002.

== Geography ==
Timonino is located 13 km (8.1 mi) south of Ustyuzhna (the district's administrative centre) by road. Voronovo is the nearest rural locality.
