= Kvashnino =

Kvashnino Квашнино
- Village
- Location within Vologda Oblast Location within Russia
- Coordinates: 58°47′N 36°17′E
- Country: Russia
- Region: Vologda Oblast
- District: Ustyuzhensky District
- Time zone: UTC+3:00

Kvashnino (Russian: Квашнино) is a rural locality (a village) in Zalesskoye Rural Settlement, Ustyuzhensky District, Vologda Oblast, Russia. The population was 38 as of 2002. There are 2 streets.

== Geography ==
Kvashnino is located 11 km (6.8 mi) southwest of Ustyuzhna (the district's administrative centre) by road. Stepachyovo is the nearest rural locality.
