= Lentyevo =

Lentyevo Лентьево
- Village
- Location within Vologda Oblast Location within Russia
- Coordinates: 58°57′N 36°35′E
- Country: Russia
- Region: Vologda Oblast
- District: Ustyuzhensky District
- Time zone: UTC+3:00

Lentyevo (Russian: Лентьево) is a rural locality (a village) and the administrative center of Lentyevskoye Rural Settlement, Ustyuzhensky District, Vologda Oblast, Russia. The population was 444 as of 2002. There are 18 streets.

== Geography ==
Lentyevo is located 24 km (15 mi) northeast of Ustyuzhna (the district's administrative centre) by road. Gromoshikha is the nearest rural locality.
