= Dolotskoye =

Dolotskoye Долоцкое
- Village
- Location within Vologda Oblast Location within Russia
- Coordinates: 58°57′N 35°58′E
- Country: Russia
- Region: Vologda Oblast
- District: Ustyuzhensky District
- Time zone: UTC+3:00

Dolotskoye (Russian: Долоцкое) is a rural locality (a village) and the administrative center of Mezzhenskoye Rural Settlement, Ustyuzhensky District, Vologda Oblast, Russia. The population was 500 as of 2002. There are 10 streets.

== Geography ==
Dolotskoye is located 35 km (22 mi) northwest of Ustyuzhna (the district's administrative centre) by road. Mikhalyovo is the nearest rural locality.
