= Malaya Dubrovochka =

Malaya Dubrovochka Малая Дубровочка
- Village
- Location within Vologda Oblast Location within Russia
- Coordinates: 58°40′N 36°10′E
- Country: Russia
- Region: Vologda Oblast
- District: Ustyuzhensky District
- Time zone: UTC+3:00

Malaya Dubrovochka (Russian: Малая Дубровочка) is a rural locality (a village) in Zalesskoye Rural Settlement, Ustyuzhensky District, Vologda Oblast, Russia. The population was 2 as of 2002.

== Geography ==
Malaya Dubrovochka is located 28 km (17 mi) southwest of Ustyuzhna (the district's administrative centre) by road. Maloye Vosnoye is the nearest rural locality.
