= Kuzemino =

Kuzemino Куземино
- Village
- Location within Vologda Oblast Location within Russia
- Coordinates: 58°35′N 36°21′E
- Country: Russia
- Region: Vologda Oblast
- District: Ustyuzhensky District
- Time zone: UTC+3:00

Kuzemino (Russian: Куземино) is a rural locality (a village) in Nikolskoye Rural Settlement, Ustyuzhensky District, Vologda Oblast, Russia. The population was 9 as of 2002.

== Geography ==
Kuzemino is located 32 km (20 mi) southwest of Ustyuzhna (the district's administrative centre) by road. Vorotishino is the nearest rural locality.
