= Alekino, Ustyuzhensky District, Vologda Oblast =

Alekino Алекино
- Village
- Location within Vologda Oblast Location within Russia
- Coordinates: 58°48′N 36°32′E
- Country: Russia
- Region: Vologda Oblast
- District: Ustyuzhensky District
- Time zone: UTC+3:00

Alekino (Russian: Алекино) is a rural locality (a village) in Ustyuzhenskoye Rural Settlement, Ustyuzhensky District, Vologda Oblast, Russia. The population was 12 as of 2002.

== Geography ==
Alekino is located 27 km (17 mi) southwest of Ustyuzhna (the district's administrative centre) by road. Maximovskoye is the nearest rural locality.
