= Alexandrovo-Maryino =

Alexandrovo-Maryino Александрово-Марьино
- Village
- Location within Vologda Oblast Location within Russia
- Coordinates: 58°54′N 36°41′E
- Country: Russia
- Region: Vologda Oblast
- District: Ustyuzhensky District
- Time zone: UTC+3:00

Alexandrovo-Maryino (Russian: Александрово-Марьино) is a rural locality (a village) in Posyolok imeni Zhelyabovo, Ustyuzhensky District, Vologda Oblast, Russia. The population was 33 as of 2002.

== Geography ==
Alexandrovo-Maryino is located 18 km (11 mi) northeast of Ustyuzhna (the district's administrative centre) by road. Matveyevo is the nearest rural locality.
