= Maloye Vosnoye =

Maloye Vosnoye Малое Восное
- Village
- Location within Vologda Oblast Location within Russia
- Coordinates: 58°41′N 36°11′E
- Country: Russia
- Region: Vologda Oblast
- District: Ustyuzhensky District
- Time zone: UTC+3:00

Maloye Vosnoye (Russian: Малое Восное) is a rural locality (a village) and the administrative center of Zalesskoye Rural Settlement, Ustyuzhensky District, Vologda Oblast, Russia. The population was 301 as of 2002.

== Geography ==
Maloye Vosnoye is located 26 km (16 mi) southwest of Ustyuzhna (the district's administrative centre) by road. Zykovo is the nearest rural locality.
