= Degtyarnya =

Degtyarnya Дегтярня
- Village
- Location within Vologda Oblast Location within Russia
- Coordinates: 58°40′N 36°34′E
- Country: Russia
- Region: Vologda Oblast
- District: Ustyuzhensky District
- Time zone: UTC+3:00

Degtyarnya (Russian: Дегтярня) is a rural locality (a village) in Nikiforovskoye Rural Settlement, Ustyuzhensky District, Vologda Oblast, Russia. The population was 11 as of 2002.

== Geography ==
Degtyarnya is located 26 km (16 mi) southeast of Ustyuzhna (the district's administrative centre) by road. Kruglitsy is the nearest rural locality.
