= Glukhovo-1 =

Glukhovo-1 Глухово-1
- Village
- Location within Vologda Oblast Location within Russia
- Coordinates: 58°44′N 36°07′E
- Country: Russia
- Region: Vologda Oblast
- District: Ustyuzhensky District
- Time zone: UTC+3:00

Glukhovo-1 (Russian: Глухово-1) is a rural locality (a village) in Zalesskoye Rural Settlement, Ustyuzhensky District, Vologda Oblast, Russia. The population was 5 as of 2002.

== Geography ==
Glukhovo-1 is located 28 km (17 mi) southwest of Ustyuzhna (the district's administrative centre) by road. Glukhovo-2 is the nearest rural locality.
