= Dementyevo, Ustyuzhensky District, Vologda Oblast =

Dementyevo Дементьево
- Village
- Location within Vologda Oblast Location within Russia
- Coordinates: 58°47′N 36°23′E
- Country: Russia
- Region: Vologda Oblast
- District: Ustyuzhensky District
- Time zone: UTC+3:00

Dementyevo (Russian: Дементьево) is a rural locality (a village) in Ustyuzhenskoye Rural Settlement, Ustyuzhensky District, Vologda Oblast, Russia. The population was 14 as of 2002.

== Geography ==
Dementyevo is located 7 km (4.3 mi) southwest of Ustyuzhna (the district's administrative centre) by road. Kuzminskoye is the nearest rural locality.
