= Zvana =

Zvana Звана
- Village
- Location within Vologda Oblast Location within Russia
- Coordinates: 58°39′N 36°37′E
- Country: Russia
- Region: Vologda Oblast
- District: Ustyuzhensky District
- Time zone: UTC+3:00

Zvana (Russian: Звана) is a rural locality (a village) in Nikiforovskoye Rural Settlement, Ustyuzhensky District, Vologda Oblast, Russia. The population was 37 as of 2002. There are 2 streets.

== Geography ==
Zvana is located 30 km (19 mi) southeast of Ustyuzhna (the district's administrative centre) by road. Strashino is the nearest rural locality.
