= Dorino =

Dorino Дорино
- Village
- Location within Vologda Oblast Location within Russia
- Coordinates: 58°45′N 36°03′E
- Country: Russia
- Region: Vologda Oblast
- District: Ustyuzhensky District
- Time zone: UTC+3:00

Dorino (Russian: Дорино) is a rural locality (a village) in Zalesskoye Rural Settlement, Ustyuzhensky District, Vologda Oblast, Russia. The population was 4 as of 2002.

== Geography ==
Dorino is located 34 km (21 mi) southwest of Ustyuzhna (the district's administrative centre) by road. Yartsevo is the nearest rural locality.
