= Kostyanovo =

Kostyanovo Костьяново
- Village
- Location within Vologda Oblast Location within Russia
- Coordinates: 58°33′N 36°29′E
- Country: Russia
- Region: Vologda Oblast
- District: Ustyuzhensky District
- Time zone: UTC+3:00

Kostyanovo (Russian: Костьяново) is a rural locality (a village) in Nikolskoye Rural Settlement, Ustyuzhensky District, Vologda Oblast, Russia. The population was 2 as of 2002.

== Geography ==
Kostyanovo is located 41 km (25 mi) south of Ustyuzhna (the district's administrative centre) by road. Yemelyanikha is the nearest rural locality.
