= Dyagilevo, Ustyuzhensky District, Vologda Oblast =

Dyagilevo Дягилево
- Village
- Location within Vologda Oblast Location within Russia
- Coordinates: 58°44′N 36°27′E
- Country: Russia
- Region: Vologda Oblast
- District: Ustyuzhensky District
- Time zone: UTC+3:00

Dyagilevo (Russian: Дягилево) is a rural locality (a village) in Ustyuzhenskoye Rural Settlement, Ustyuzhensky District, Vologda Oblast, Russia. The population was 3 as of 2002.

== Geography ==
Dyagilevo is located 14 km (8.7 mi) south of Ustyuzhna (the district's administrative centre) by road. Shilovo is the nearest rural locality.
