= Vysotino =

Vysotino Высотино
- Village
- Location within Vologda Oblast Location within Russia
- Coordinates: 58°44′N 36°25′E
- Country: Russia
- Region: Vologda Oblast
- District: Ustyuzhensky District
- Time zone: UTC+3:00

Vysotino (Russian: Высотино) is a rural locality (a village) in Ustyuzhenskoye Rural Settlement, Ustyuzhensky District, Vologda Oblast, Russia. The population was 15 as of 2002.

== Geography ==
Vysotino is located 12 km (7.5 mi) south of Ustyuzhna (the district's administrative centre) by road. Brilino is the nearest rural locality.
