= Modno =

Modno Модно
- Selo
- Location within Vologda Oblast Location within Russia
- Coordinates: 58°55′N 36°54′E
- Country: Russia
- Region: Vologda Oblast
- District: Ustyuzhensky District
- Time zone: UTC+3:00

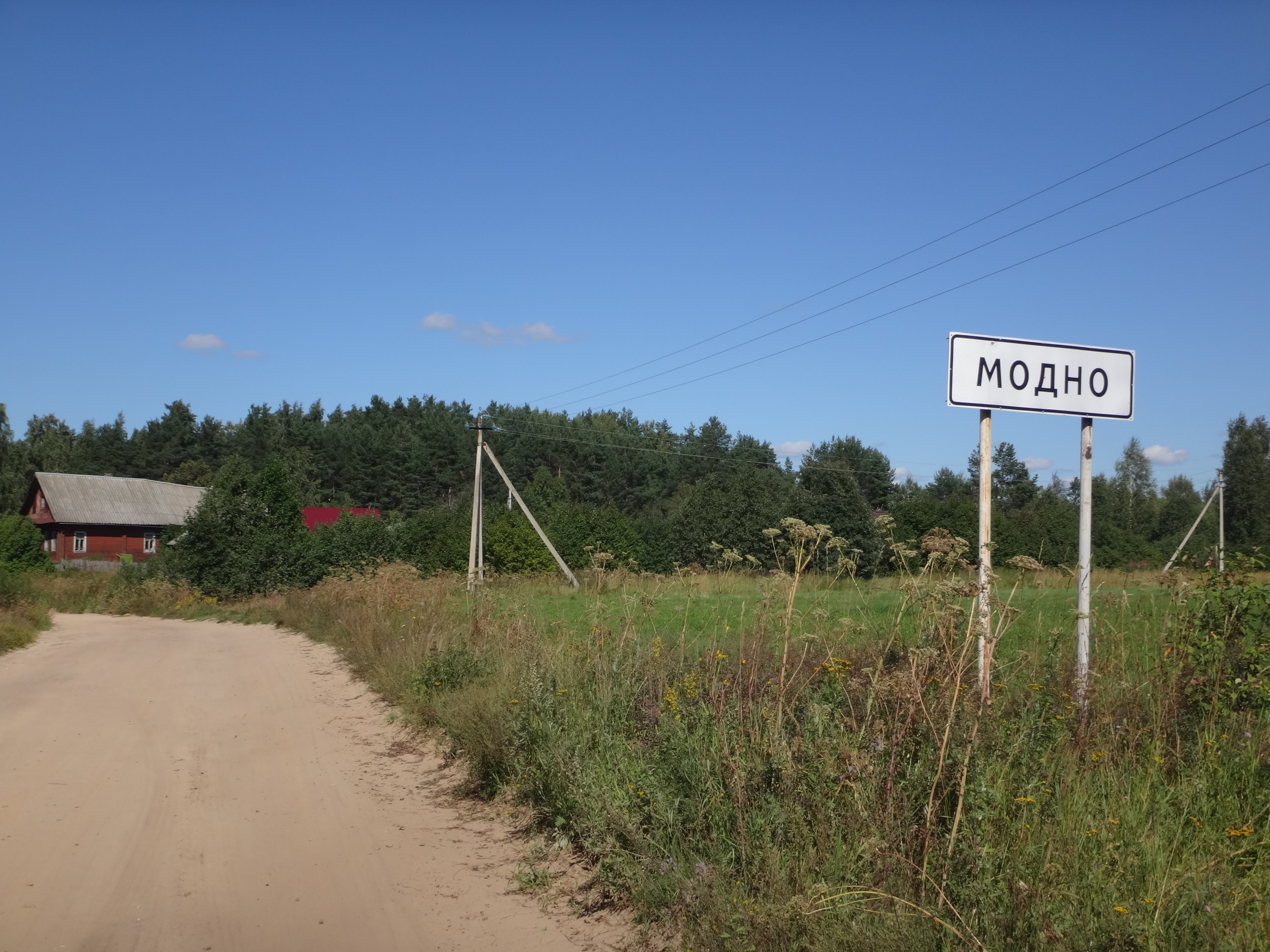
Entrance to Modno

Modno (Russian: Модно) is a rural locality (a selo) in Modenskoye Rural Settlement, Ustyuzhensky District, Vologda Oblast, Russia. The population was 19 as of 2002. There are 4 streets.

== Geography ==
Modno is located 39 km (24 mi) northeast of Ustyuzhna (the district's administrative centre) by road. Plotichye is the nearest rural locality.
