= Sludy, Vologda Oblast =

Sludy Слуды
- Village
- Location within Vologda Oblast Location within Russia
- Coordinates: 58°52′N 36°52′E
- Country: Russia
- Region: Vologda Oblast
- District: Ustyuzhensky District
- Time zone: UTC+3:00

Sludy (Russian: Слуды) is a rural locality (a village) in Modenskoye Rural Settlement, Ustyuzhensky District, Vologda Oblast, Russia. The population was 226 as of 2002. There are 12 streets.

== Geography ==
Sludy is located 30 km (19 mi) east of Ustyuzhna (the district's administrative centre) by road. Plotichye is the nearest rural locality.
