= Borovinka, Velikoustyugsky District, Vologda Oblast =

Borovinka Боровинка
- Village
- Location within Vologda Oblast Location within Russia
- Coordinates: 60°56′N 46°29′E
- Country: Russia
- Region: Vologda Oblast
- District: Velikoustyugsky District
- Time zone: UTC+3:00

Borovinka (Russian: Боровинка) is a rural locality (a village) in Krasavinskoye Rural Settlement, Velikoustyugsky District, Vologda Oblast, Russia. The population was 11 as of 2002.

== Geography ==
Borovinka is located 24 km northeast of Veliky Ustyug (the district's administrative centre) by road. Skornyakovo is the nearest rural locality.
