= Borovinka, Velsky District, Arkhangelsk Oblast =

Borovinka Боровинка
- Village
- Location within Arkhangelsk Oblast Location within Russia
- Coordinates: 60°58′N 41°48′E
- Country: Russia
- Region: Arkhangelsk Oblast
- District: Velsky District
- Time zone: UTC+3:00

Borovinka (Russian: Боровинка) is a rural locality (a village) in Pezhemskoye Rural Settlement of Velsky District, Arkhangelsk Oblast, Russia. The population was 48 as of 2014. There are 3 streets.

== Geography ==
Borovinka is located 23 km southwest of Velsk (the district's administrative centre) by road. Pezhma is the nearest rural locality.
