= Danilovskoye, Vologda Oblast =

Danilovskoye Даниловское
- Settlement
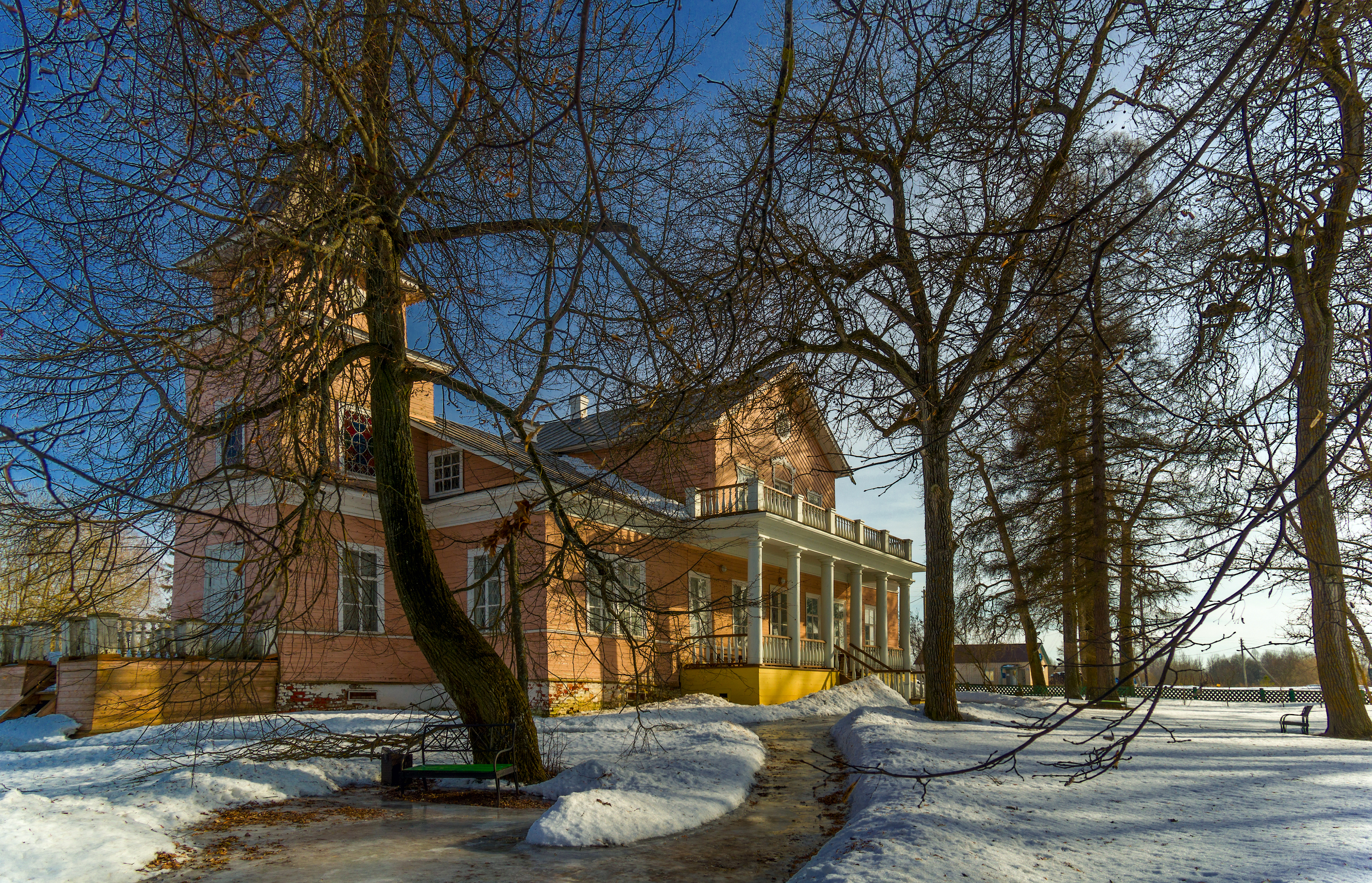
- Batyushkov estate in Danilovskoye

- Location within Vologda Oblast Location within Russia
- Coordinates: 58°42′N 36°27′E
- Country: Russia
- Region: Vologda Oblast
- District: Ustyuzhensky District
- Time zone: UTC+3:00

Danilovskoye (Russian: Даниловское) is a rural locality (a settlement) in Nikiforovskoye Rural Settlement, Ustyuzhensky District, Vologda Oblast, Russia. The population was 213 as of 2002. There are 3 streets.

== Geography ==
Danilovskoye is located 16 km (9.9 mi) south of Ustyuzhna (the district's administrative centre) by road. Volosovo is the nearest rural locality.
