= Ustyuzhna =

Town in Vologda Oblast, Russia

Ustyuzhna Устюжна
- Town
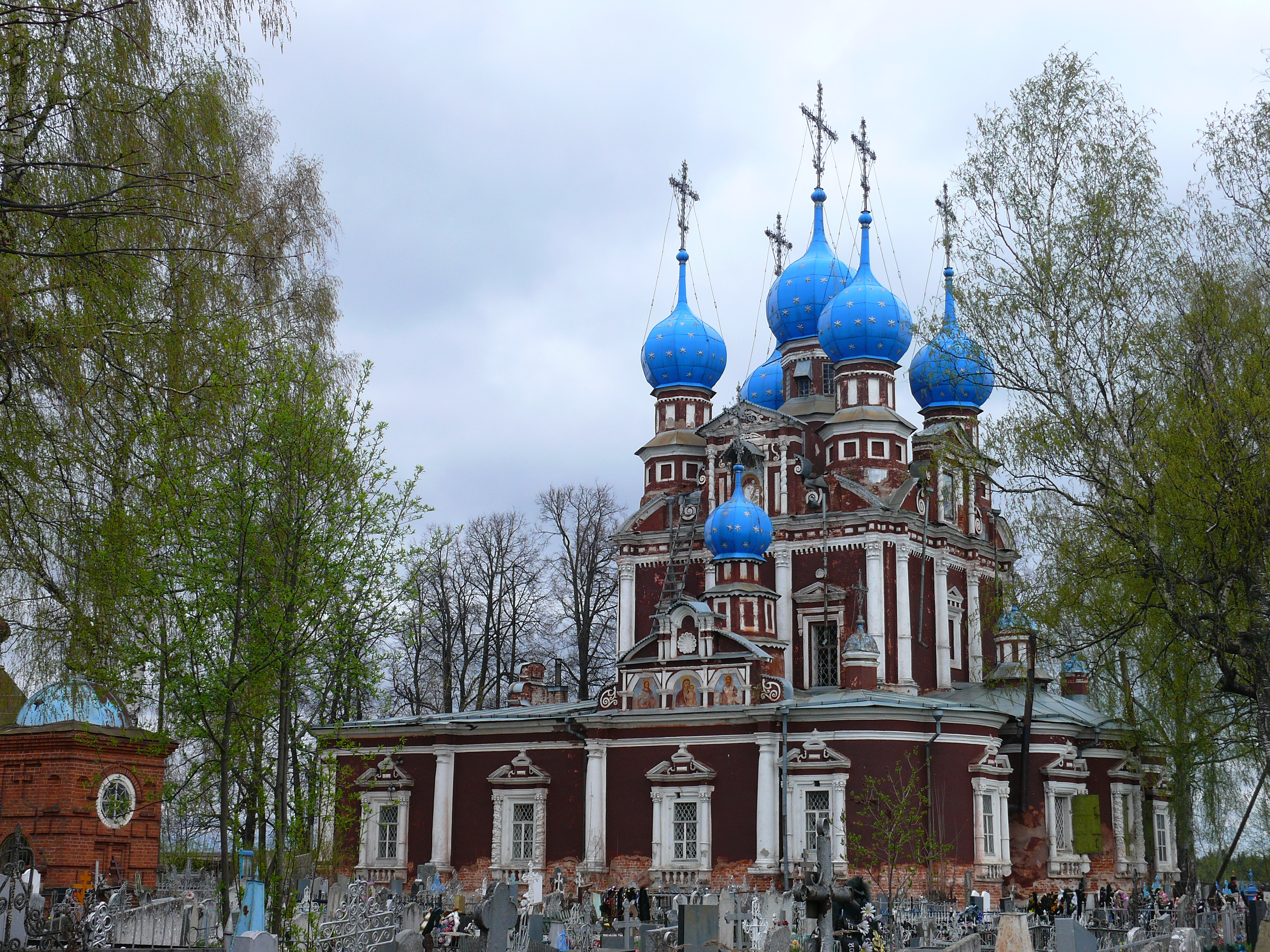
- The Church of Our Lady of Kazan

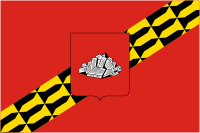
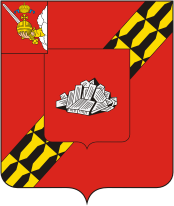
- Flag Coat of arms
- Interactive map of Ustyuzhna
- Location of Ustyuzhna Ustyuzhna (Vologda Oblast)
- Coordinates: 58°50′N 36°26′E
- Country: Russia
- Federal subject: Vologda Oblast
- Administrative district: Ustyuzhensky District
- Town of district significanceSelsoviet: Ustyuzhna
- First mentioned: 1252
- Elevation: 120 m (390 ft)

Population (2010 Census)
  - Total: 9,501
  - Estimate (2023): 7,653 (−19.5%)

Administrative status
  - Capital of: Ustyuzhensky District, town of district significance of Ustyuzhna

Municipal status
  - Municipal district: Ustyuzhensky Municipal District
  - Urban settlement: Ustyuzhna Urban Settlement
  - Capital of: Ustyuzhensky Municipal District, Ustyuzhna Urban Settlement
- Time zone: UTC+3 (MSK)
- Postal code: 162840
- OKTMO ID: 19650101001

Ustyuzhna (Russian: У́стюжна) is a town and the administrative center of Ustyuzhensky District in Vologda Oblast, Russia, located on the Mologa River, 260 kilometers (160 mi) west of Vologda, the administrative center of the oblast. Population: 9,501 (2010 census); 10,507 (2002 census); 10,035 (1989 Soviet census).

== History ==
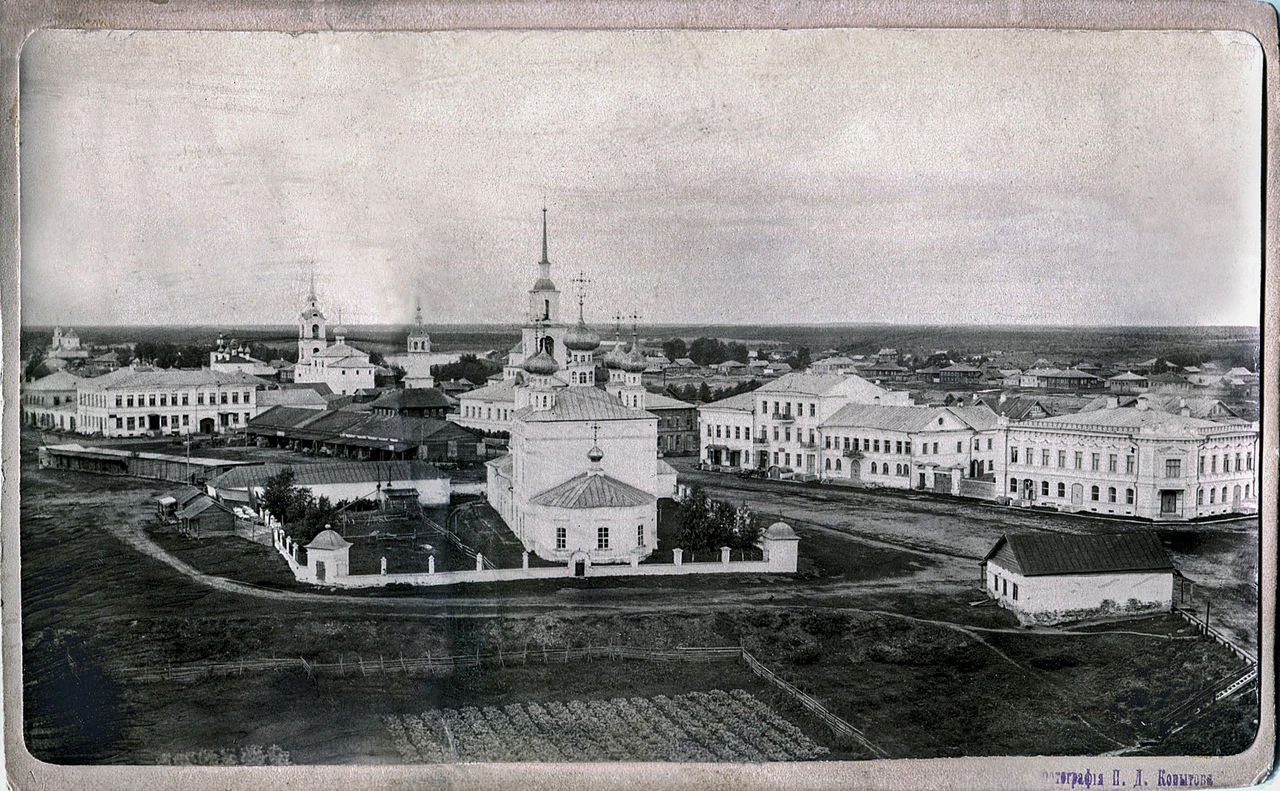
Torgovaya Square in the early 20th century

Considered to have been founded in the 11th century, it was first mentioned, as Zhelezny Ustyug (Железный Устюг), in 1252, and in the following centuries was called variously Ustyuzhna Zheleznopolskaya, Ustizhna, Ustizhnya, Ustyuzhnya, and Yustyzhnya. In the 16th–18th centuries it was known mostly as Ustyuzhna-Zheleznaya or Ustyuzhna-Zheleznopolskaya, but since 1808 it had mostly been referred to by its modern name. The origin of the name is unclear, though it may be related to that of Ustyug.

In 1252, Ustyuzhna was a part of the Principality of Uglich. It was situated on the shortest route from Novgorod to the basin of the Northern Dvina, which caused an interest of the Novgorod Republic. In the 14th century, Novgorod made several attempts to establish control over the town. During the Time of Troubles, the Polish Army laid a siege on Ustyuzhna, but did not manage to conquer the town. In the 16th and 17th centuries, the territory became one of the most important centers of metal production in Russia, second only to Tula. Between 1702 and 1714, Izhinsky iron-making plant, built by the Admiralty, existed in Ustyuzhna, making it a major producer of arms.

In the course of the administrative reform carried out in 1708 by Peter the Great, Ustyuzhna was included into Ingermanland Governorate (known since 1710 as Saint Petersburg Governorate) and named one of the towns constituting the governorate. In 1727, separate Novgorod Governorate was split off, which included Ustyuzhna as a part of its Belozersk Province. In 1738, Ustyuzhna was chartered and became the seat of Ustyuzhensky Uyezd. In 1776, the uyezd was transferred to Novgorod Viceroyalty. In 1796, the viceroyalty was abolished and Ustyuzhensky Uyezd was transferred to Novgorod Governorate.

In June 1918, five uyezds of Novgorod Governorate, including Ustyuzhensky Uyezd, were split off to form Cherepovets Governorate, with the administrative center in Cherepovets. On August 1, 1927, Cherepovets Governorate was abolished and its territory became Cherepovets Okrug of Leningrad Oblast. At the same time, uyezds were abolished and Ustyuzhensky District was established, with the administrative center in Ustyuzhna. On September 23, 1937, Ustyuzhensky District was transferred to newly established Vologda Oblast and remained there ever since.

== Administrative and municipal status ==
Within the framework of administrative divisions, Ustyuzhna serves as the administrative center of Ustyuzhensky District and of Ustyuzhensky Selsoviet of that district, even though it is not a part of the latter. As an administrative division, it is incorporated within Ustyuzhensky District as a town of district significance of Ustyuzhna. As a municipal division, the town of district significance of Ustyuzhna is incorporated within Ustyuzhensky Municipal District as Ustyuzhna Urban Settlement and serves as the administrative center of the municipal district, urban settlement, and of Ustyuzhenskoye Rural Settlement, even though it is not a part of the latter.

== Economy ==
=== Industry ===
The main industrial enterprise in Ustyuzhna is a cheese production factory.

=== Transportation ===
A114 Highway, connecting Vologda to Cherepovets and St. Petersburg, passes north of Ustyuzhna. There is a road connecting Ustyuzhna with the highway. Ustyuzhna is also connected by roads with Tver via Vesyegonsk, with Bezhetsk via Sandovo, and with Borovichi via Pestovo. There are also local roads.

The closest railway station is located in Sandovo.

== Culture and recreation ==
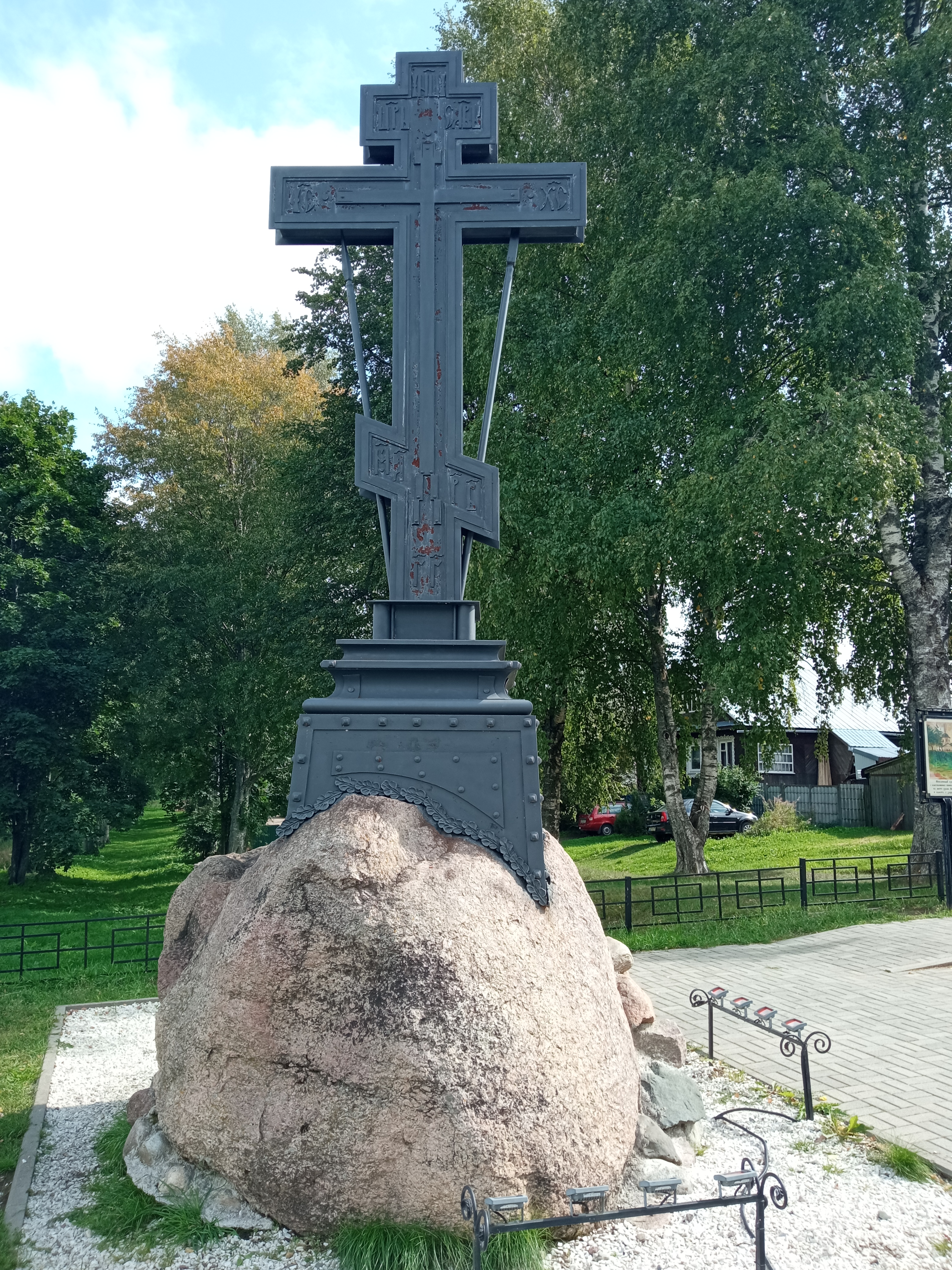
Wayside cross dedicated to defenders from the Polish–Lithuanian army

Ustyuzhna contains thirty-nine objects classified as cultural and historical heritage by Russian federal law and additionally ninety-seven objects classified as cultural and historical heritage of local importance. Ustyuzhna is a historical town with the well-preserved center from the 19th century.

The Ustyuzhensky District Museum is located in Ustyuzhna.

It is believed that the plot of The Government Inspector, a comedy by Russian playwright Nikolai Gogol, is based on a true story which took place in Ustyuzhna in the early 19th century.
