= Ustyuzhensky District =

Ustyuzhensky District Устюженский район (Russian)
- District
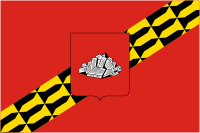
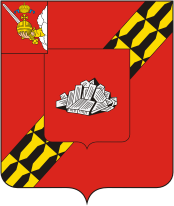
- Flag Coat of arms
- Location of Ustyuzhensky District in Vologda Oblast
- Coordinates: 58°50′N 36°26′E
- Country: Russia
- Federal subject: Vologda Oblast
- Established: August 1, 1927
- Administrative center: Ustyuzhna

Area
  - Total: 3,600 km^{2} (1,400 sq mi)

Population (2010 Census)
  - Total: 18,738
  - Density: 5.2/km^{2} (13/sq mi)
  - Urban: 50.7%
  - Rural: 49.3%

Administrative structure
  - Administrative divisions: 1 Towns of district significance, 13 Selsoviets
  - Inhabited localities: 1 cities/towns, 224 rural localities

Municipal structure
  - Municipally incorporated as: Ustyuzhensky Municipal District
  - Municipal divisions: 1 urban settlements, 9 rural settlements
- Time zone: UTC+3 (MSK)
- OKTMO ID: 19650000
- Website: http://ustuzhensky.munrus.ru

Ustyuzhensky District (Russian: Устюже́нский райо́н) is an administrative and municipal district (raion), one of the twenty-six in Vologda Oblast, Russia. It is located in the southwest of the oblast and borders with Babayevsky District in the north, Kaduysky District in the northeast, Cherepovetsky District in the east, Vesyegonsky and Sandovsky Districts of Tver Oblast in the southeast, Pestovsky District of Novgorod Oblast in the southwest, and with Chagodoshchensky District in the west. The area of the district is 3,600 square kilometers (1,400 sq mi). Its administrative center is the town of Ustyuzhna. Population: 18,738 (2010 Census); 21,679 (2002 Census); 22,483 (1989 Soviet census). The population of Ustyuzhna accounts for 50.7% of the district's population.

== Geography ==
The landscape of the district is flat and much of the district's territory belongs to the basin of the Mologa River and its principal left tributaries, the Kobozha and the Chagodoshcha. The Mologa itself crosses the district from southwest to northeast. The rivers in the southeastern part of the district drain to the rivers which were formerly right tributaries of the Mologa, but currently flow to the Rybinsk Reservoir.

There are lakes in the district, the biggest of which are Lake Otno and Lake Talets, both in the northeast of the district.

== History ==
Ustyuzhna was first mentioned in the chronicles in 1252 as Ustyug-Zhelezny, but archaeological data show that the settlement already existed in the 11th century. In 1252, it was a part of the Principality of Uglich. Ustyuzhna lied on the shortest route from Novgorod to the basin of the Northern Dvina River, which caused an understandable interest of the Novgorod Republic. In the 14th century, Novgorod tried several times to establish control over the area. During the Time of Troubles, the Polish Army laid a siege on Ustyuzhna, but did not manage to conquer the town. In the 16th and 17th centuries, the area became one of the most important centers of metal production in Russia. In the beginning of the 18th century, it was a major producer of arms.

In the course of the administrative reform carried out in 1708 by Peter the Great, it was included into Ingermanland Governorate (known since 1710 as Saint Petersburg Governorate). In 1727, separate Novgorod Governorate was split off. In 1738, Ustyuzhna was chartered and became the seat of Ustyuzhensky Uyezd. In 1776, the area was transferred to Novgorod Viceroyalty. In 1796, the viceroyalty was abolished, and Ustyuzhensky Uyezd was transferred to Novgorod Governorate.

In June 1918, five uyezds of Novgorod Governorate, including Ustyuzhensky Uyezd, were split off to form Cherepovets Governorate, with the administrative center in Cherepovets. On August 1, 1927, Cherepovets Governorate was abolished, and Cherepovets Okrug of Leningrad Oblast was established on its former territory. Simultaneously, uyezds were abolished, and Ustyuzhensky District was established, with the administrative center in the town of Ustyuzhna. On September 23, 1937, Ustyuzhensky District was transferred to newly established Vologda Oblast and remained there ever since.

== Economy ==
=== Industry ===
In the district, there are enterprises of timber, food, and textile industries, as well as production of construction materials.

=== Agriculture ===
Agriculture in the district is based on cattle breeding.

=== Transportation ===
A114 highway, connecting Vologda to Cherepovets and St. Petersburg, crosses the district from east to west, passing north of Ustyuzhna. Ustyuzhna is connected by roads with Tver via Vesyegonsk, Bezhetsk via Sandovo, and Borovichi via Pestovo. There are also local roads.

== Culture and recreation ==
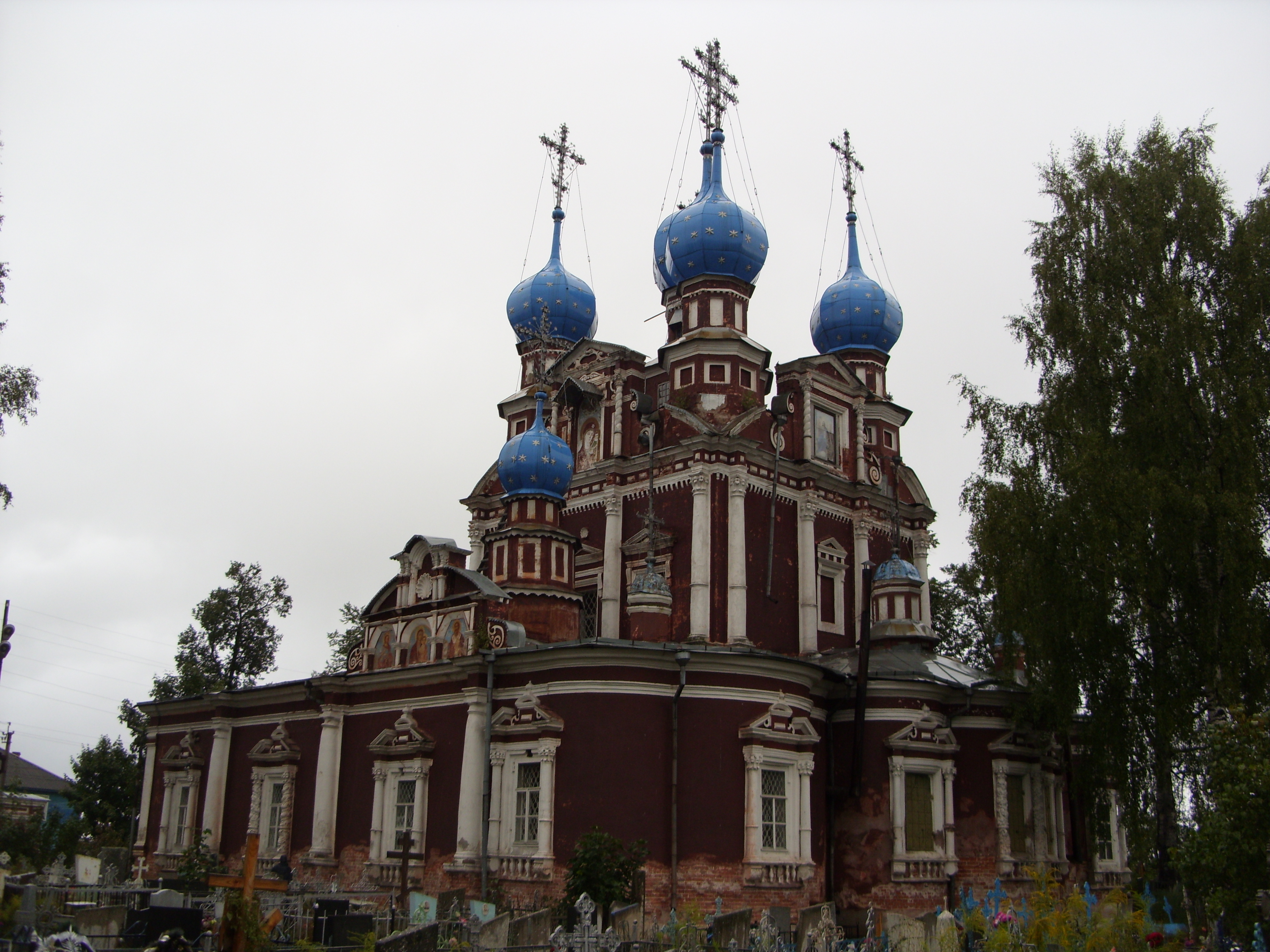
The Church of Our Lady of Kazan (beginning of the 18th century) in Ustyuzhna

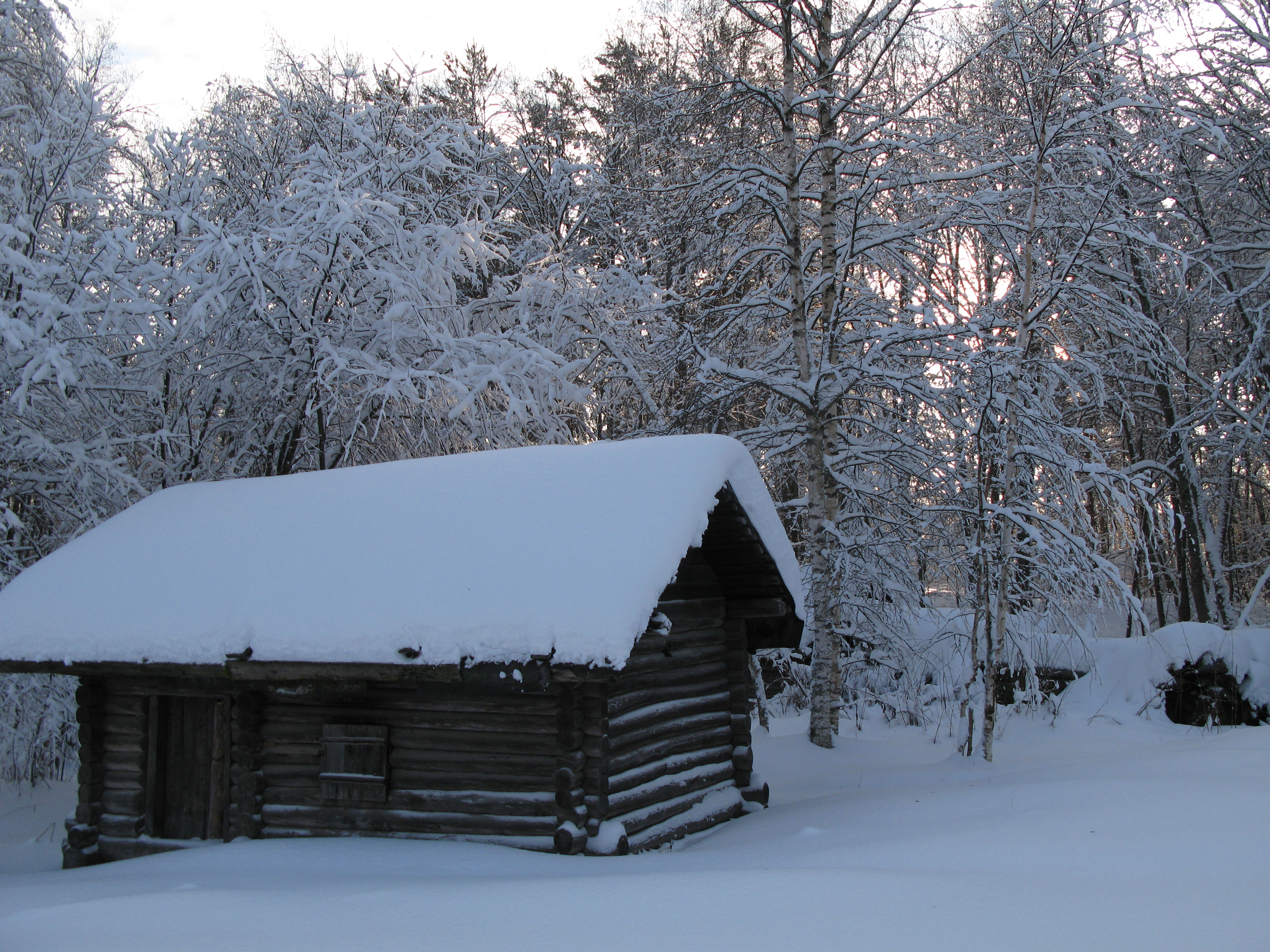
Black Bathhouses in the village of Sludy are protected as a cultural heritage monument

The district contains 44 objects (39 of them in Ustyuzhna) classified as cultural and historical heritage by the Russian Federal law, and additionally 145 objects (97 of them located in Ustyuzhna) classified as cultural and historical heritage of local importance. Ustyuzhna is a historical town with the well-preserved center from the 19th century.

The Ustyuzhensky District Museum is located in Ustyuzhna. In the settlement of Danilovskoye close to Ustyuzhna, there is Batyushkov estate which is now the museum of Batyushkov family and of Aleksandr Kuprin. Konstantin Batyushkov, a Russian 19th-century poet, was raised in the estate, whereas Kuprin, a 20th-century author, visited the estate on a regular basis between 1906 and 1911.
