= Yefimovsky (inhabited locality) =

Yefimovsky (Russian: Ефимовский; masculine), Yefimovskaya (Ефимовская; feminine), or Yefimovskoye (Ефимовское; neuter) is the name of several inhabited localities in Russia.

Urban localities

- Yefimovsky (urban-type settlement), an urban-type settlement in Yefimovskoye Settlement Municipal Formation of Boksitogorsky District, Leningrad Oblast

Rural localities

- Yefimovskoye, Kostroma Oblast, a village in Sudayskoye Settlement of Chukhlomsky District of Kostroma Oblast
- Yefimovskoye, Yaroslavl Oblast, a village in Novinkovsky Rural Okrug of Pervomaysky District of Yaroslavl Oblast
- Yefimovskaya, Arkhangelsk Oblast, a village in Berezonavolotsky Selsoviet of Krasnoborsky District of Arkhangelsk Oblast
- Yefimovskaya, Sverdlovsk Oblast, a village in Taborinsky District of Sverdlovsk Oblast
- Yefimovskaya, Vladimir Oblast, a village in Sudogodsky District of Vladimir Oblast
- Yefimovskaya, Tarnogsky District, Vologda Oblast, a village in Verkhnekokshengsky Selsoviet of Tarnogsky District of Vologda Oblast
- Yefimovskaya, Vozhegodsky District, Vologda Oblast, a village in Vozhegodsky Selsoviet of Vozhegodsky District of Vologda Oblast
