= Tikhvinka =

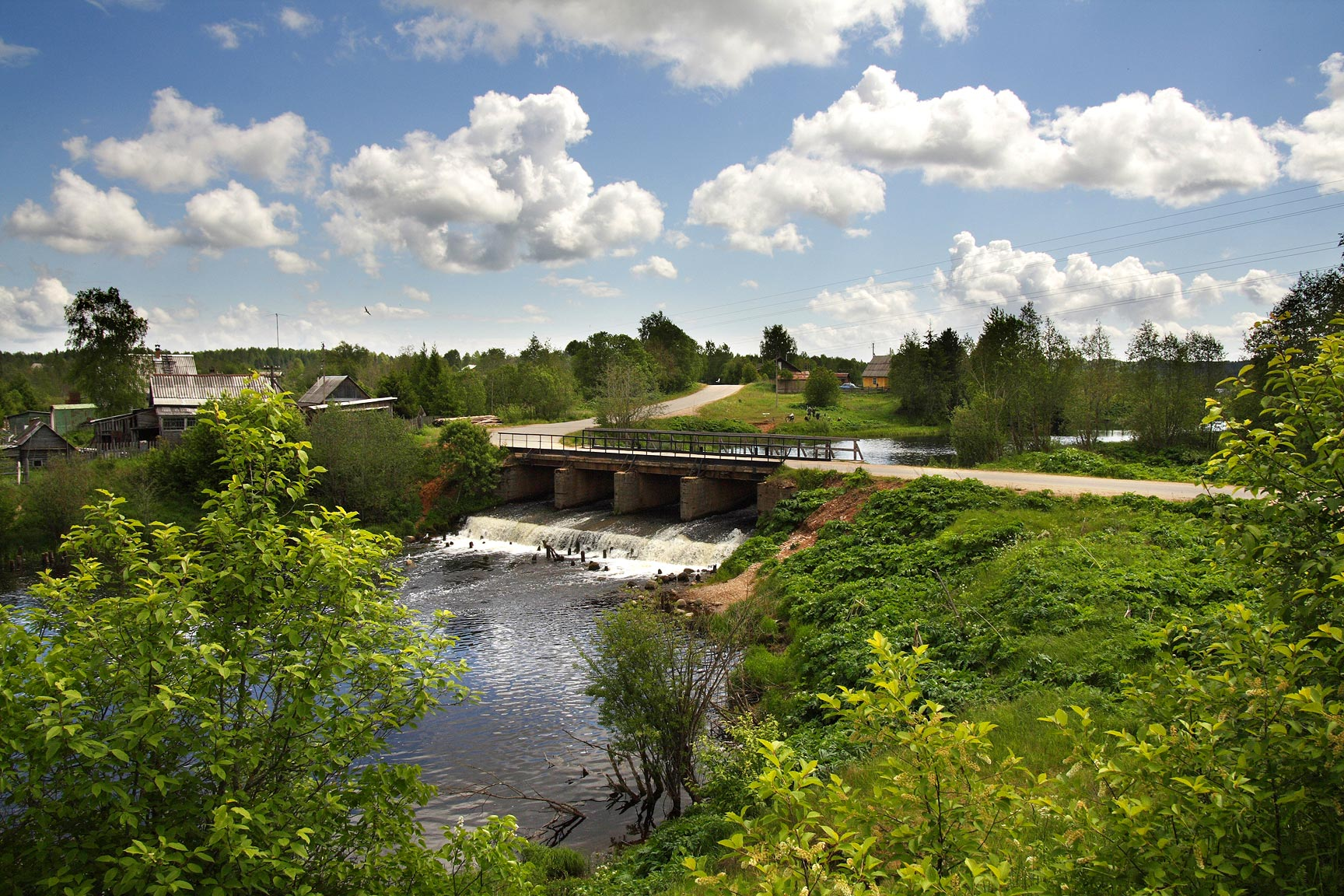
- The Tikhvinka and the Tikhvin Assumption Monastery
- Native name: Тихвинка (Russian)

Location
- Country: Russia

Physical characteristics
- Source: Lake Yeglino
- Mouth: Syas
  - coordinates: 59°39′52″N 33°08′31″E
- Length: 144 km (89 mi)
- Basin size: 2,140 km^{2} (830 sq mi)

Basin features
- Progression: Syas→ Lake Ladoga→ Neva→ Gulf of Finland

The Tikhvinka (Russian: Тихвинка) is a river in Boksitogorsky and Tikhvinsky Districts of Leningrad Oblast, Russia, a right and the biggest tributary of the Syas. The town of Tikhvin is located on its banks. It is 144 kilometres (89 mi) long, and the area of its basin 2,140 square kilometres (830 sq mi). The main tributaries of the Tikhvinka are the Ryadan (left) and the Shomushka (right).

The source of the Tikhvinka is in Lake Yeglino in Boksitogorsky District, several kilometers northwest of the urban-type settlement of Yefimovsky. The river flows northwest, through Lake Ozerskoye, turns west and eventually southwest. Upstream of the village of Astrachi the Tikhvinka accepts the Ryadan from the left and turns west. Downstream of Astrachi, the Tikhvinka enters Tikhvinsky District and flows through the town of Tikhvin. The mouth of the Tikhvinka is located between the villages of Ovino and Khalezevo.

The drainage basin of the Tikhvinka include the western part of Boksitogorsky District and areas in the southeast of Tikhvinsky District. The towns of Tikhvin, Boksitogorsk, and Pikalyovo are located in the basin of the Tikhvinka.

The whole course of the Tikhvinka is a part of the Tikhvinskaya water system, one of the waterways constructed in the early 19th century to connect the basins of the Volga and the Neva. The waterway runs from the Syas upstream of the Tikhvinka. Lake Yelgino is connected by the Tikhvin Canal, 6 kilometers (3.7 mi) with the upper course of the Volchina. The waterway then follows downstream the Gorun, the Chagodoshcha, and the Mologa. Currently, it is not used for any commercial navigation. Most of the locks built on the Tikhvinka decayed and are not in use.
