= Boksitogorsk =

Town in Leningrad Oblast, Russia

Boksitogorsk Бокситогорск
- Town
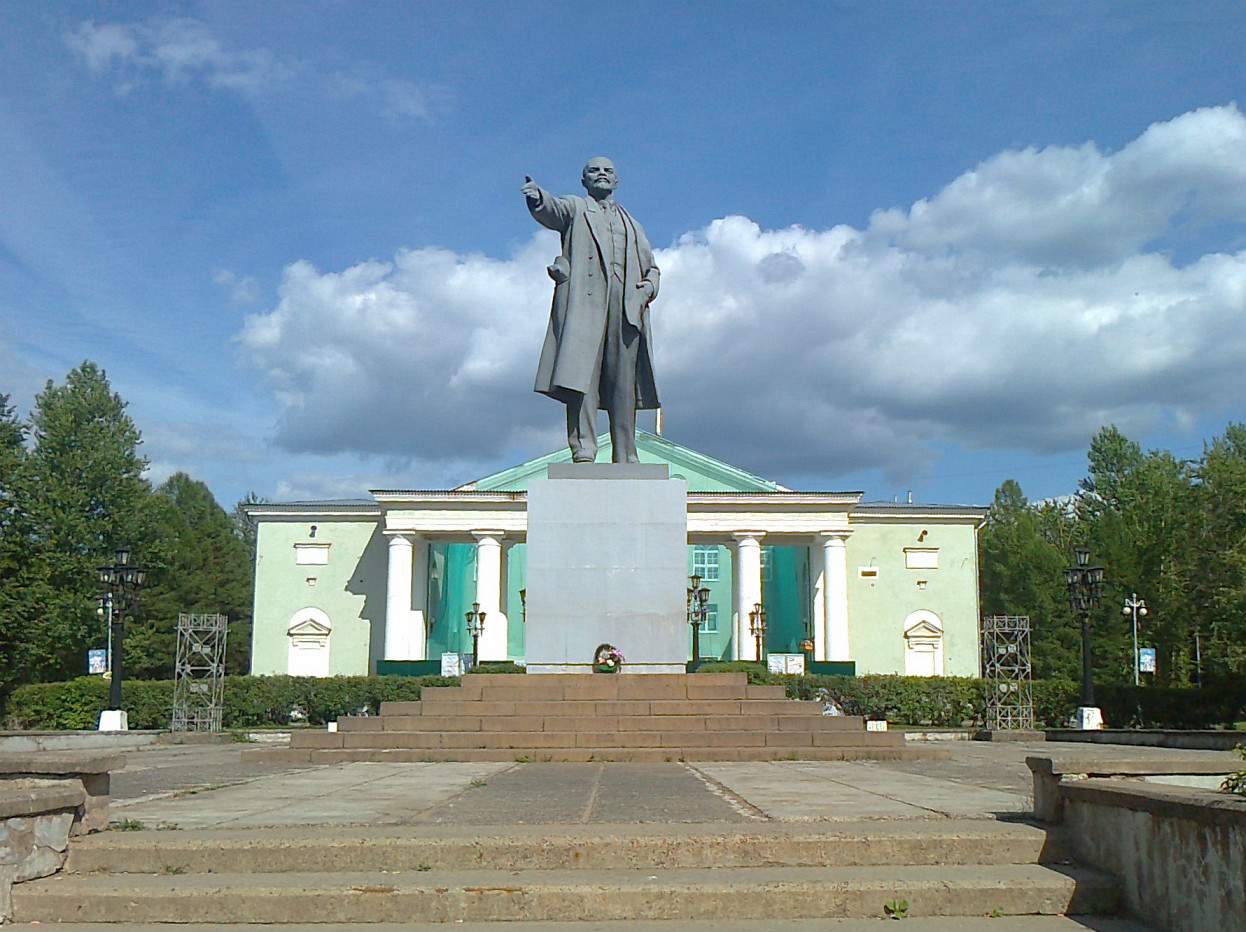
- Lenin Square in Boksitogorsk

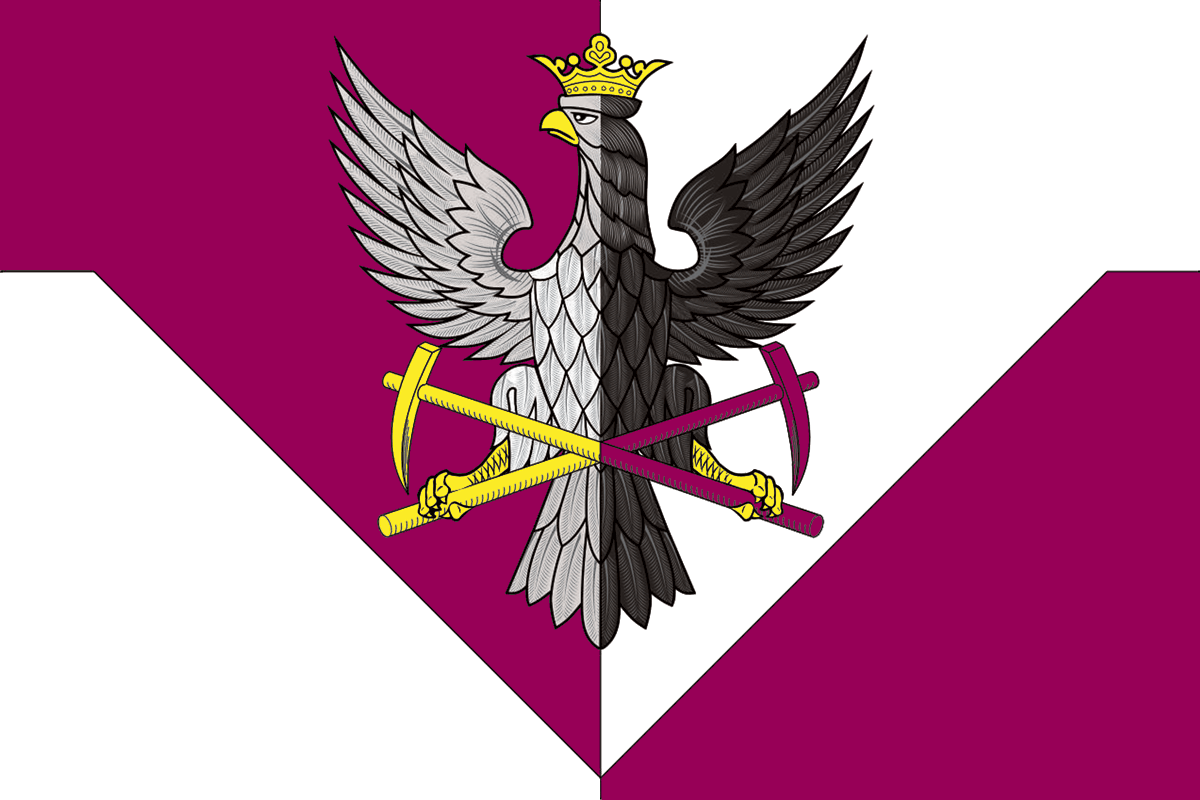
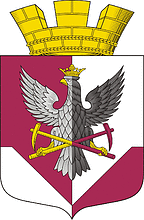
- Flag Coat of arms
- Interactive map of Boksitogorsk
- Location of Boksitogorsk Boksitogorsk (Leningrad Oblast)
- Coordinates: 59°29′N 33°50′E
- Country: Russia
- Federal subject: Leningrad Oblast
- Administrative district: Boksitogorsky District
- Settlement municipal formationSelsoviet: Boksitogorskoye Settlement Municipal Formation
- Founded: 1929
- Town status since: 1950
- Elevation: 100 m (330 ft)

Population (2010 Census)
  - Total: 16,585
  - Estimate (2024): 15,480 (−6.7%)

Administrative status
  - Capital of: Boksitogorsky District, Boksitogorskoye Settlement Municipal Formation

Municipal status
  - Municipal district: Boksitogorsky Municipal District
  - Urban settlement: Boksitogorskoye Urban Settlement
  - Capital of: Boksitogorsky Municipal District, Boksitogorskoye Urban Settlement
- Time zone: UTC+3 (MSK)
- Postal codes: 187650, 187651
- Dialing code: +7 81366
- OKTMO ID: 41603101001
- Website: www.boksitogorsk.org

Boksitogorsk (Russian: Бокситого́рск) is a town and the administrative center of Boksitogorsky District in Leningrad Oblast, Russia, located on the banks of the Pyardomlya River in the basin of the Syas River, 245 kilometers (152 mi) east of St. Petersburg. Population: 16,585. (2010 census)

== History ==
The settlement of Boksity (Бокси́ты) was established in 1929 to house the workers of the local bauxite mine. It was a part of Tikhvinsky District of Leningrad Oblast. In December 1934, the construction of a bauxite plant started. In 1935, the settlement was granted urban-type settlement status and given its present name. In 1940, the population neared 10,000 and a school, kindergarten, nursery, ambulatory and drugstore, several canteens, and shops were built. In 1950, Boksitogorsk was granted town status and on July 25, 1952 it became the administrative center of Boksitogorsky District.

== Administrative and municipal status ==
Within the framework of administrative divisions, Boksitogorsk serves as the administrative center of Boksitogorsky District. As an administrative division, it is, together with ten rural localities, incorporated within Boksitogorsky District as Boksitogorskoye Settlement Municipal Formation. As a municipal division, Boksitogorskoye Settlement Municipal Formation is incorporated within Boksitogorsky Municipal District as Boksitogorskoye Urban Settlement.

== Demographics ==
Population: 16,585 (2010 census); 18,128 (2002 census); 21,839 (1989 Soviet census).

The town population reached its peak in 1979, at 23,200 people. Like much of Russia, the population of Boksitogorsk has gradually decreased since the 1980s. The ethnic composition of the town's population is primarily Russian.

== Economy ==
=== Industry ===
Several manufacturing enterprises are located in Boksitogorsk, including the aluminum metallurgy plant, which is one of the daughter companies of Rusal, as well as producers of reinforced concrete, alcohol, food, and milk. Companies extracting peat and producing plastic ware also operate out of Boksitogorsk.

=== Transportation ===
Autoroute H-3 Dymi–Boksitogorsk–Bochevo runs across the town.

Autoroute A-114 Issad–Pikalyovo–Vologda runs 11 kilometers (6.8 mi) to the north of Boksitogorsk.

A local line connects Bolshoy Dvor railway station on the St. Petersburg–Vologda railway line with Boksitogorsk. However, currently there is no passenger service. Domestic flights onboard An-2 and Yak-12 craft to Leningrad and Tikhvin were serviced from the local airfield between the 1960s and 1980s.

Public transport includes several town, suburb, and inter-town bus routes operated by local transport companies.

== Culture and recreation ==
Boksitogorsk contains one cultural heritage monument classified as cultural and historical heritage of local significance. This is the cinema building.

== Twin towns and sister cities ==
Boksitogorsk is twinned with:

- Kiukainen (consolidated in 2009 with Eura), Finland (current status unknown)
- Harjavalta, Finland
- Nakkila, Finland
