= Smolenets =

Smolenets (Russian: Смоленец) is the name of several rural localities (villages and logging depot settlements) in Russia:

- Smolenets, Arkhangelsk Oblast, a village in Leshukonsky Selsoviet of Leshukonsky District of Arkhangelsk Oblast
- Smolenets, Leningrad Oblast, a logging depot settlement in Tikhvinskoye Settlement Municipal Formation of Tikhvinsky District, Leningrad Oblast
- Smolenets, Pskov Oblast, a village in Porkhovsky District of Pskov Oblast
