= Tikhvinsky =

Tikhvinsky (masculine), Tikhvinskaya (feminine), or Tikhvinskoye (neuter) may refer to:

- Tikhvinsky District, a district of Leningrad Oblast, Russia
- Tikhvinskoye Urban Settlement, a municipal formation corresponding to Tikhvinskoye Settlement Municipal Formation, an administrative division of Tikhvinsky District of Leningrad Oblast, Russia
- Tikhvinskoye (rural locality), a rural locality (a selo) in Rybinsky District of Yaroslavl Oblast, Russia
