= Yefimovsky (urban-type settlement) =

Yefimovsky Ефимовский
- Urban-type settlement
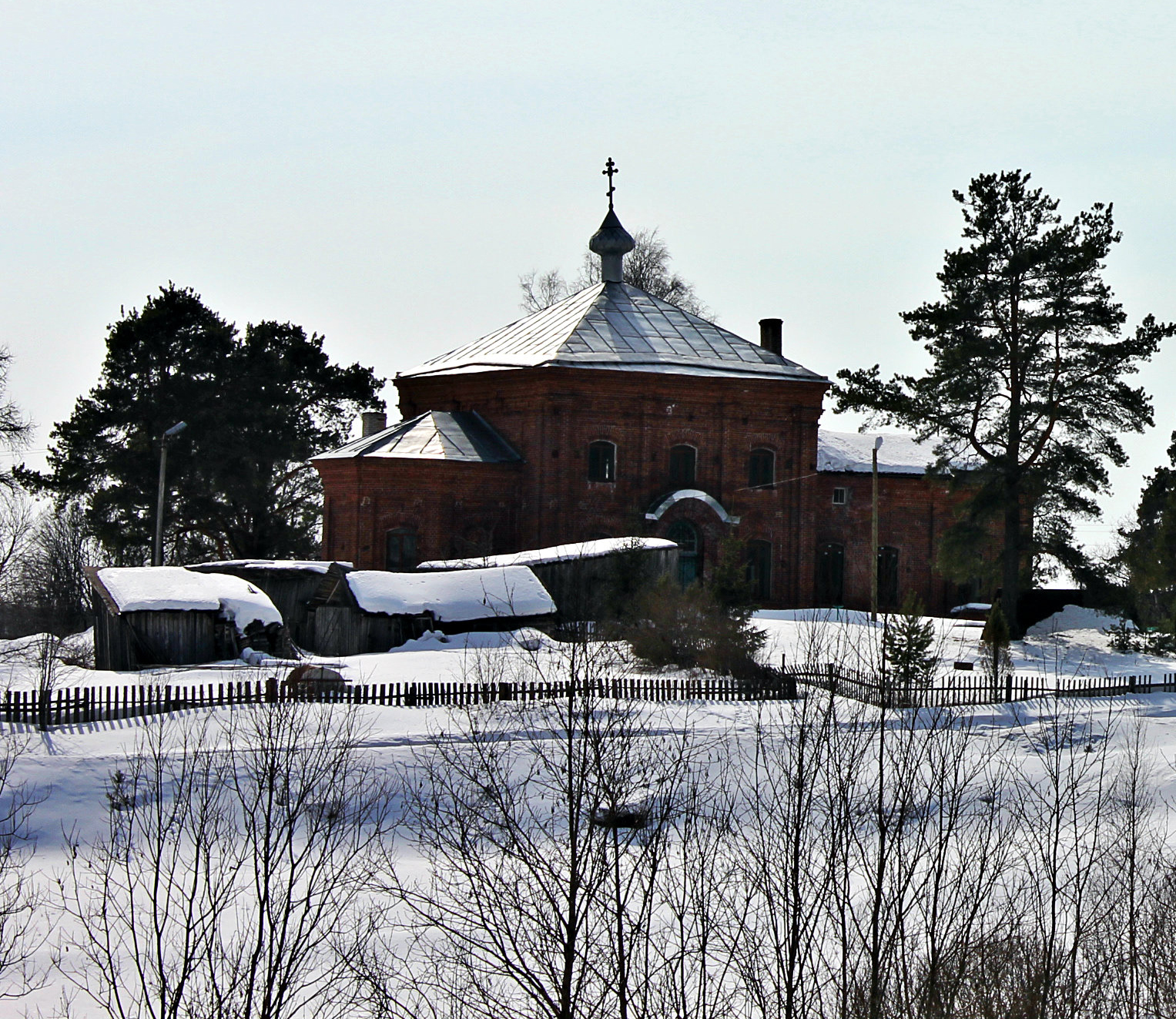
- Interactive map of Yefimovsky
- Location of Yefimovsky Yefimovsky (Leningrad Oblast)
- Coordinates: 59°29′40″N 34°40′00″E
- Country: Russia
- Federal subject: Leningrad Oblast
- Administrative district: Boksitogorsky District
- Founded: 1910
- Urban-type settlement status since: 1964

Population (2010 Census)
  - Total: 3,611
  - Estimate (2024): 3,466 (−4%)

Municipal status
  - Municipal district: Boksitogorsky Municipal District
  - Urban settlement: Yefimovsky Urban Settlement
  - Capital of: Yefimovsky Urban Settlement
- Time zone: UTC+3 (MSK)
- Postal code: 187620
- OKTMO ID: 41603155051

Yefimovsky (Russian: Ефимовский) is an urban locality (an urban-type settlement) in Boksitogorsky District of Leningrad Oblast, Russia, located on the Sominka River, in the basin of the Chagodoshcha River. Municipally, it is incorporated as Yefimovskoye Urban Settlement, one of the three urban settlements in the district. Population: 3,611 (2010 census); 3,937 (2002 census); 5,177 (1989 Soviet census).

== History ==
In the 19th century, the place where Yefimovsky is currently located, was a part of Sominskaya Volost of Ustyuzhensky Uyezd, Novgorod Governorate. In 1918, it was transferred in newly created Cherepovets Governorate. In the second half of the 19th century (the dates of 1862 and 1882 are mentioned in the sources) a glass-making factory was built by Lanko, a German merchant. The settlement serving the glass-making factory was known as Bystroretsky and is currently a part of Yefimovsky (Bystroretskaya Street). In 1905, a railway station was opened on the railway connecting Podborovye and Tikhvin. The name of the station was Somino, however, in 1908 it was renamed Yefimovskaya. The settlement of Yefimovsky was initially serving the railway station.

On August 1, 1927, the uyezds were abolished, Yefimovsky District with the center in the settlement of Yefimovsky was established as part of Cherepovets Okrug of Leningrad Oblast. On July 23, 1930 the okrugs were abolished as well, and the district became directly subordinate to the oblast. On February 1, 1963 the district was abolished, and, after a short period, was merged into Boksitogorsky District.

In 1957, the first brick house was built in Yefimovsky. In December 1964, Yefimovsky was granted work settlement status.

== Economy ==
=== Industry ===
The economy of Yefimovsky is based on timber industry and food industry.

=== Transportation ===
Yefimovsky is a principal station on the railroad connecting Saint Petersburg and Vologda. It is also connected by roads to the A114 highway between Vologda and Saint Petersburg.

The Tikhvinskaya water system, one of the waterways constructed in the early 19th century to connect the river basins of the Volga and the Neva, passes close to Yefimovsky. Currently, it is not used for any commercial navigation.
