= Boksitogorsky =

Boksitogorsky (masculine), Boksitogorskaya (feminine), or Boksitogorskoye (neuter) may refer to:

- Boksitogorsky District, a district in Leningrad Oblast, Russia
- Boksitogorskoye Urban Settlement, a municipal formation corresponding to Boksitogorskoye Settlement Municipal Formation, an administrative division of Boksitogorsky District of Leningrad Oblast, Russia
