= Yefimovsky =

Yefimovsky (masculine), Yefimovskaya (feminine), or Yefimovskoye (neuter) may refer to:

People

- Yelizaveta Yefimovskaya, wife of Ivan Chernyshyov, Russian field marshal

Places

- Yefimovsky District (1927–1963), a former district of Leningrad Oblast; merged into Boksitogorsky District
- Yefimovsky (inhabited locality) (Yefimovskaya, Yefimovskoye), several inhabited localities in Russia
