= Irodion Sergeev =

Russian icon painter

- Иродион Сергеев
- Born: c. 1615
- Died: 1689/1690
- Other names: Rodion Sergiev, hierodeacon Sergius
- Occupation: Russian icon painter

Irodion Sergeev (also Rodion Sergiev, hierodeacon Sergius; c. 1615 — 1689/1690) was a Russian icon painter. He is the author of “The Tale of the Miracles of the Tikhvin Icon of the Mother of God.”

== Biography and work ==
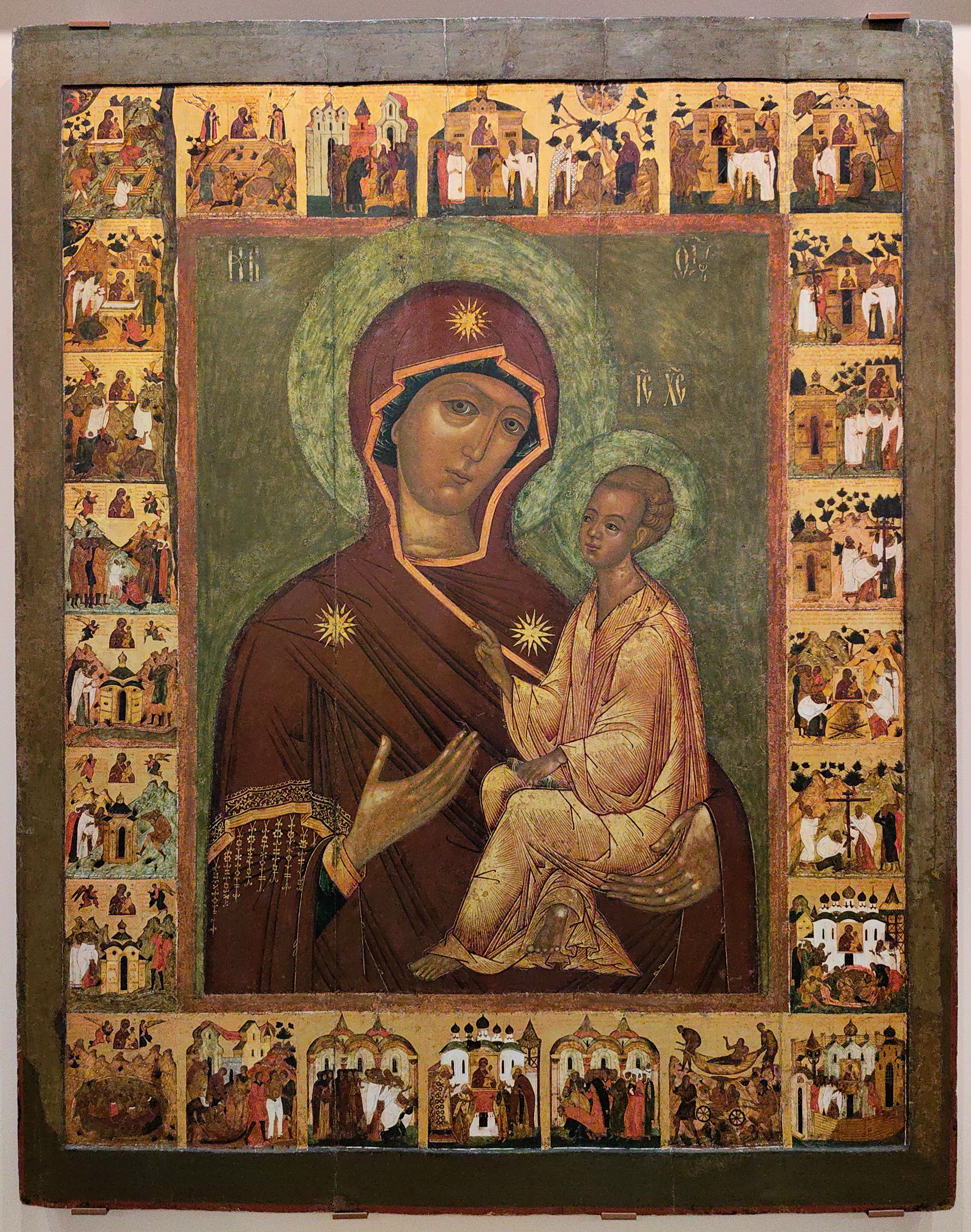
Rodion Sergiev — The Tikhvin Mother of God with Miracles — 1678 — Novgorod State Museum-Reserve — icon from the Dormition Cathedral of the Great Tikhvin Monastery.

He was born around 1615. He is first mentioned in sources in 1639. In 1658, he was summoned to Moscow to create “The Tale of the Miracles of the Tikhvin Icon of the Mother of God,” which describes certain historical events from 1393 to 1648. A fragment of this work, dedicated to the siege of the Tikhvin Monastery by the Swedes in 1613, was published in the third volume of the Complete Collection of Russian Chronicles.

In the 1670s, he was one of the leading artists working in Tikhvin (alongside the Falaleev brothers, Ivan Ustmushsky, and others). He executed a number of icons for the Alexander-Svirsky and Tikhvin monasteries and painted the Trinity Cathedral of the Alexander-Svirsky Monastery. In 1686, he composed a liturgical service to the Tikhvin Icon of the Mother of God. The last mention of the icon painter dates to February 1689/1690.

== Surviving works ==
The Tikhvin Mother of God (1680, Novgorod State Integrated Museum-Reserve)
