= Astrachi =

Astrachi (Russian: Астрачи) is the name of several rural localities in Bolshedvorskoye Settlement Municipal Formation of Boksitogorsky District of Leningrad Oblast, Russia:

- Astrachi (settlement of the crossing), a settlement of the crossing
- Astrachi (village), a village
