= Tikhvinsky District =

Tikhvinsky District Тихвинский район (Russian)
- District
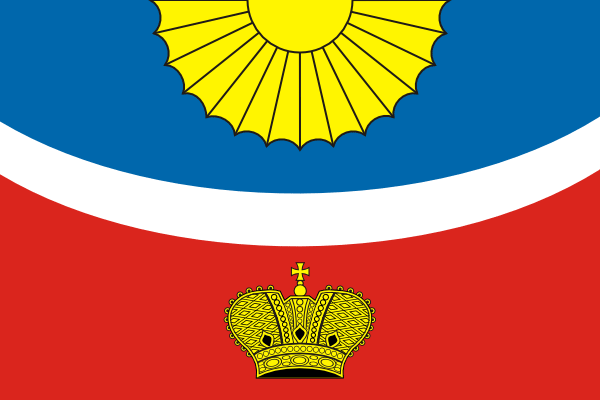
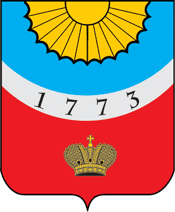
- Flag Coat of arms
- Location of Tikhvinsky District in Leningrad Oblast
- Coordinates: 59°38′N 33°30′E
- Country: Russia
- Federal subject: Leningrad Oblast
- Established: 1 August 1927
- Administrative center: Tikhvin

Area
  - Total: 7,018 km^{2} (2,710 sq mi)

Population (2010 Census)
  - Total: 12,529
  - Density: 1.785/km^{2} (4.624/sq mi)
  - Urban: 0%
  - Rural: 100%

Administrative structure
  - Administrative divisions: 8 settlement municipal formation
  - Inhabited localities: 1 cities/towns, 197 rural localities

Municipal structure
  - Municipally incorporated as: Tikhvinsky Municipal District
  - Municipal divisions: 1 urban settlements, 8 rural settlements
- Time zone: UTC+3 (MSK)
- OKTMO ID: 41645000
- Website: http://tikhvin.org/

Tikhvinsky District (Russian: Ти́хвинский райо́н) is an administrative and municipal district (raion), one of the seventeen in Leningrad Oblast, Russia. It is located in the southeast of the oblast and borders with Lodeynopolsky District in the north, Podporozhsky District in the northeast, Babayevsky District of Vologda Oblast in the east, Boksitogorsky District in the southeast, Lyubytinsky District of Novgorod Oblast in the south, Kirishsky District in the west, and Volkhovsky District in the northwest. The area of the district is 7,018 square kilometers (2,710 sq mi). Its administrative center is the town of Tikhvin. Population (excluding the administrative center): 12,529 (2010 census); 14,637 (2002 Census); 17,104 (1989 Soviet census).

== Geography ==
Almost all the entire area of the district belongs to the drainage basin of Lake Ladoga. The rivers in the southern part of the district drain into the Syas, which itself crosses the district from south to north. The biggest tributary of the Syas within the district is the Tikhvinka (right). The central and northern parts of the district belong to the basin of the Pasha River, a tributary of the Svir. The source of the Pasha is in Lake Pashozero inside the district, and a considerable part of the course of the Pasha lies in the district. The major tributary of the Pasha, the Kapsha River, also mainly flows within the district. Minor areas in the northeast of the district belong to the drainage basins of the Oyat, another tributary of the Svir, and the Suda, and thus the divide between the basins of the Baltic and the Caspian Seas crosses the district. Almost all of the area of the district is covered by forests. The Vepsian Upland is a hilly area in the northeast.

== History ==
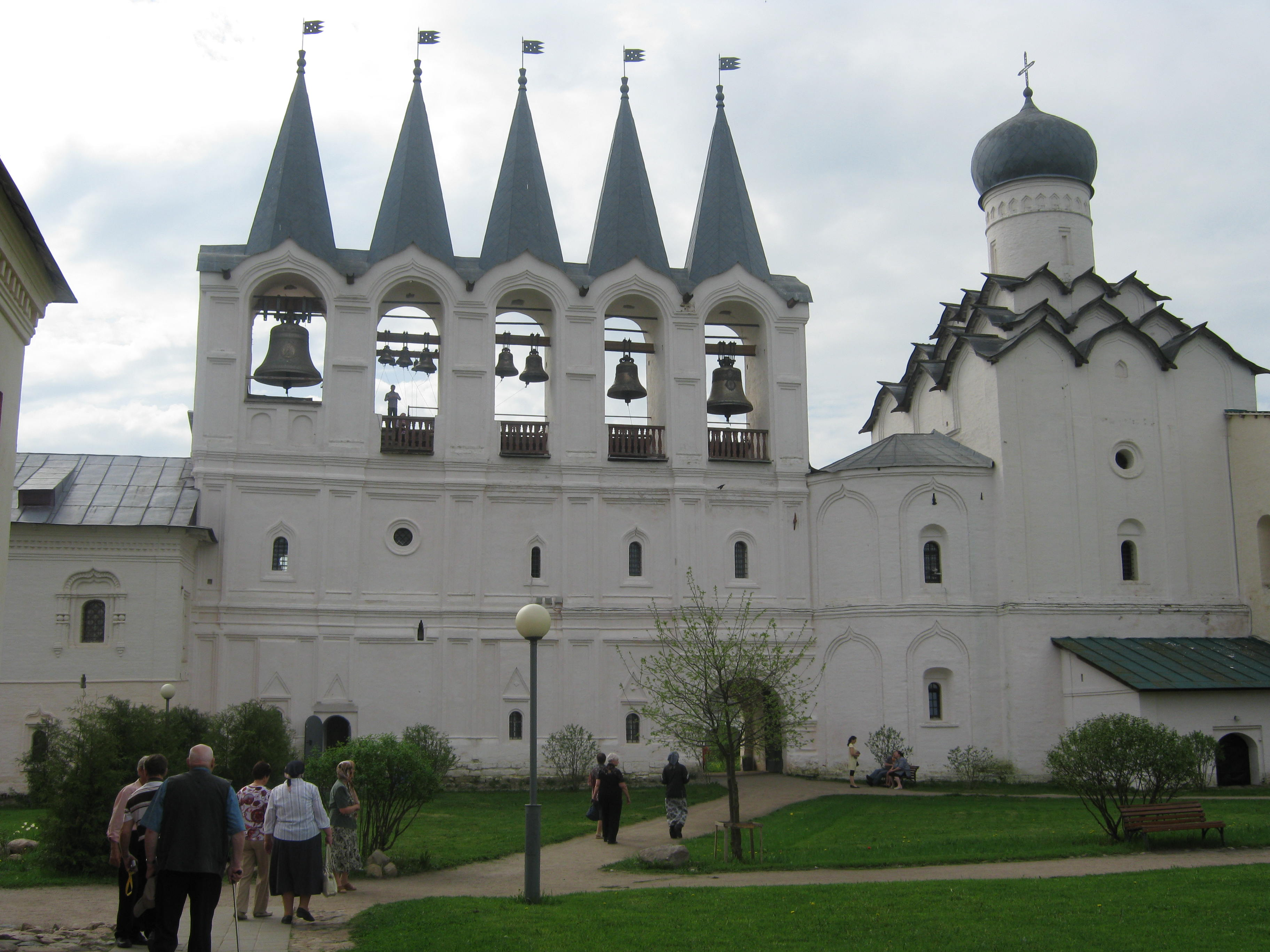
The belfry and the Assumption Church of the Tikhvin Assumption Monastery

The area was populated by Balto-Finnic peoples, whose descendants, Vepsians, still live in the district. Tikhvin was first mentioned in 1383 as Prechistensky Pogost. Until the 15th century, it was a part of the Novgorod Republic. After the fall of the republic, it was, together will all Novgorod Lands, annexed by the Grand Duchy of Moscow. The area was included into Obozerskaya Pyatina, one of the pyatinas which Novgorod Lands were divided into. Tikhvin quickly developed as an important trade center due to its location on one of the main waterways, connecting the basins of the Neva and the Volga. It was also a pilgrimage center, since the icon of the Theotokos of Tikhvin, one of the most famous Russian Orthodox icons, was held in the town. In the 15th century, the Tikhvin Assumption Monastery was founded, and the icon was moved there.

In the course of the administrative reform carried out in 1708 by Peter the Great, the area was included into Ingermanland Governorate (known since 1710 as Saint Petersburg Governorate). In 1727, separate Novgorod Governorate was split off. In 1776, the area was transferred to Novgorod Viceroyalty. In 1796, the viceroyalty was abolished, and the area, which belonged to Tikhvinsky Uyezd, was transferred to Novgorod Governorate. In 1802, the Tikhvinskaya water system, which connected the basins of the Neva and the Volga, was opened. The railroad was built in the end of the 19th century. In June 1918, five uyezds of Novgorod Governorate, including Tikhvinsky Uyezd, were split off to form Cherepovets Governorate, with the administrative center in Cherepovets.

On August 1, 1927, the uyezds were abolished and Tikhvinsky District, with the administrative center in Tikhvin, was established. The governorates were also abolished, and the district was a part of Leningrad Okrug of Leningrad Oblast. It included parts of former Tikhvinsky Uyezd. On July 23, 1930, the okrugs were abolished as well, and the districts were directly subordinated to the oblast. In 1941, during World War II, German troops tried to encircle Leningrad. In November 1941, they occupied the town of Tikhvin and held it for a month. The southwestern part of the district was occupied between October and December 1941. In 1945, Tikhvin was made a town of oblast significance, and on July 25, 1952, Boksitogorsky District split off Tikhvinsky District. In 2010, the administrative division of Leningrad Oblast was harmonized with the municipal division, and Tikhvin was made the town of district significance.

Another district established on August 1, 1927 as a part of Leningrad Okrug of Leningrad Oblast was Kapshinsky District, with the administrative center in the settlement of Shugozero. On February 1, 1963, the district was abolished, and, after a short period, split between Boksitogorsky and Tikhvinsky Districts.

== Economy ==
=== Industry ===
The industrial enterprises of the district are concentrated in the town of Tikhvin. They include a ferroalloy plant, a railway carriage production plant, as well as enterprises of timber, textile, and food industries.

=== Agriculture ===
The main agriculture specializations in the district are cattle breeding with meat and milk production, trout farming, and vegetables growing.

=== Transportation ===
A railroad connecting St. Petersburg and Vologda crosses the district from west to east. Tikhvin is the principal station within the district. A secondary railroad branches out south in Tikhvin, connecting it with Budogoshch.

The A114 highway, connecting Vologda with Cherepovets and St. Petersburg, crosses the district as well. There are also local roads.

A considerable part of the Tikhvinskaya water system, one of the waterways constructed in the early 19th century to connect the basins of the Volga and Neva Rivers, lies in Tikhvinsky District. The waterway runs from the Syas upstream the Tikhvinka River. Lake Yelgino is connected by the Tikhvin Canal, 6 kilometers (3.7 mi) with the upper course of the Volchina River. The waterway then follows downstream the Gorun River, the Chagodoshcha River, and the Mologa River. Currently, it is not used for any commercial navigation.

== Culture and recreation ==
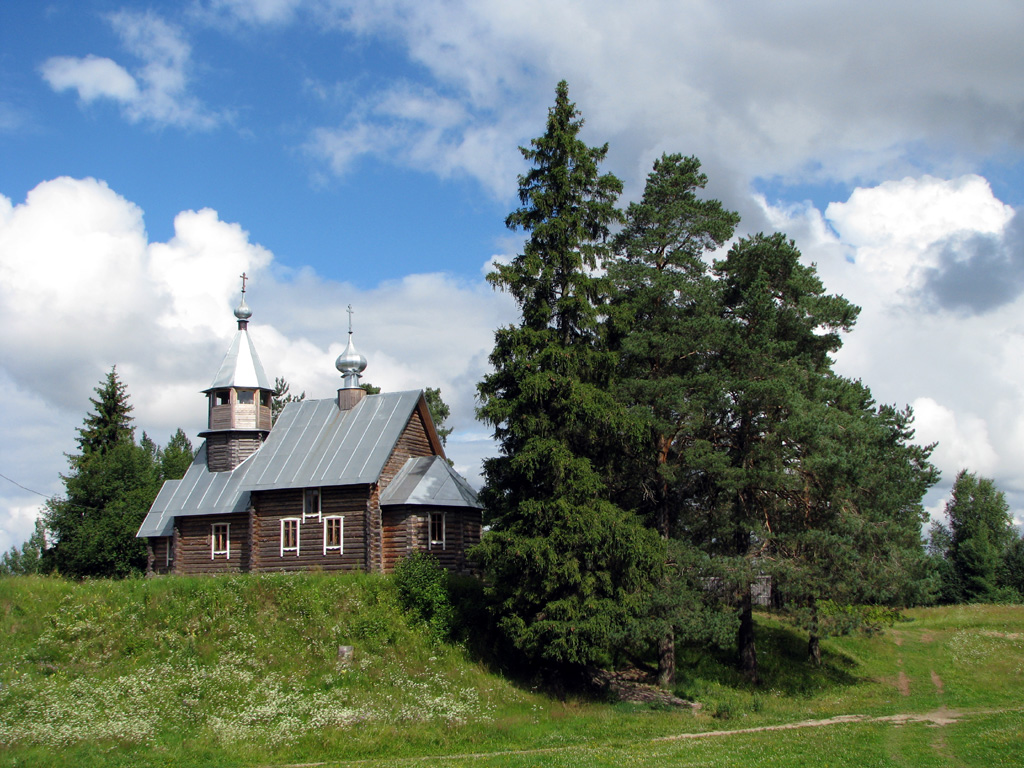
The Kazan wooden church in the selo of Shugozero.

The district contains thirty-three cultural heritage monuments of federal significance (thirty of them in Tikhvin) and additionally ninety-six objects classified as cultural and historical heritage of local significance (forty-eight of them in Tikhvin). Most of the federal monuments are buildings and structures belonging to the Tikhvin Assumption Monastery. The monastery is a major pilgrim destination, since it hosts the Theotokos of Tikhvin, one of the most celebrated Russian Orthodox icons.

Tikhvin hosts the Museum-House of Nikolai Rimsky-Korsakov, which is located in the house where Nikolai Rimsky-Korsakov, a Russian composer, was born in 1844 and spent his childhood years. Another state museum in the district is the Tikhvin Museum of History, Art, and Architecture, located in the Tikhvin Assumption Monastery. The museum presents an ethnographic collection, as well as an exhibit devoted to the Theotokos of Tikhvin.
