= Dymi =

Dymi or Dyme may refer to:

- Dymi, Achaea, a municipal unit in Achaea, Greece
- Ancient Dyme, Greece, Achaea
- Dymi, Rhodope, part of the municipal unit of Sostis, Rhodope regional unit, Greece
- Dymi, Russia, name of several rural localities in Russia
