= Syasstroy =

Town in Leningrad Oblast, Russia

Syasstroy Сясьстрой
- Town
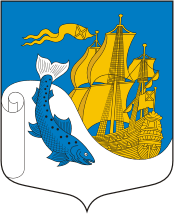
- Coat of arms
- Interactive map of Syasstroy
- Location of Syasstroy Syasstroy (Leningrad Oblast)
- Coordinates: 60°09′N 32°35′E
- Country: Russia
- Federal subject: Leningrad Oblast
- Administrative district: Volkhovsky District
- Settlement municipal formationSelsoviet: Syasstroyskoye Settlement Municipal Formation
- Founded: 1926
- Town status since: February 17, 1992
- Elevation: 25 m (82 ft)

Population (2010 Census)
  - Total: 13,745
  - Estimate (2024): 12,283 (−10.6%)

Administrative status
  - Capital of: Syasstroyskoye Settlement Municipal Formation

Municipal status
  - Municipal district: Volkhovsky Municipal District
  - Urban settlement: Syasstroyskoye Urban Settlement
  - Capital of: Syasstroyskoye Urban Settlement
- Time zone: UTC+3 (MSK)
- Postal code: 187420
- OKTMO ID: 41609108001

Syasstroy (Russian: Сясьстро́й) is a town in Volkhovsky District of Leningrad Oblast, Russia, located near the mouth of the Syas River, at its confluence with the Valgonka, close to Lake Ladoga, 140 kilometers (87 mi) east of St. Petersburg. Population: 13,745 (2010 census); 13,969 (2002 census); 16,122 (1989 Soviet census).

== History ==
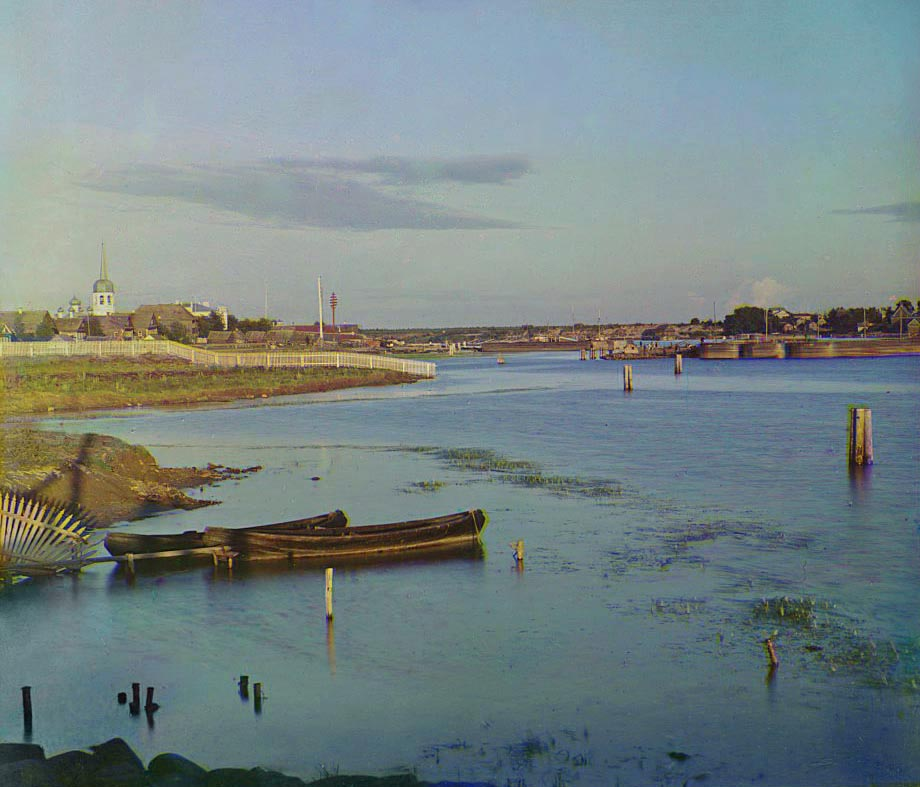
Syaske Ryadki in Syasstroy. A pre-1916 photo by Sergey Prokudin-Gorsky.

Before 1926, a small village of Nosok (Носок) existed at this location. An urban-type settlement was founded in 1926, as construction of pulp-and-paper mill started. At the time, it belonged to Volkhovsky Uyezd of Leningrad Governorate. On August 1, 1927, the uyezds were abolished and Volkhovsky District was established. The governorates were also abolished and the district became a part of Leningrad Okrug of Leningrad Oblast. On March 20, 1946, Novoladozhsky District with the administrative center located in Novaya Ladoga was split off Volkhovsky District and Syasstroy became a part of this district. On February 1, 1963, Novoladozhsky District was abolished and merged into Volkhovsky District.

Syasstroy was granted town status in 1992.

== Administrative and municipal status ==
Within the framework of administrative divisions, it is, together with ten rural localities, incorporated within Volkhovsky District as Syasstroyskoye Settlement Municipal Formation. As a municipal division, Syasstroyskoye Settlement Municipal Formation is incorporated within Volkhovsky Municipal District as Syasstroyskoye Urban Settlement.

== Economy ==
=== Industry ===
The economy of Syasstroy is dependent on just one enterprise, the paper mill, which makes it potentially very vulnerable to economic crises.

=== Transportation ===
The M18 Highway, connecting St. Petersburg with Murmansk, passes through Syasstroy. A road connects Syasstroy with Kolchanovo, on the highway heading to Vologda via Tikhvin and Cherepovets.

The railway connecting St. Petersburg and Murmansk runs several kilometers east of Syasstroy. The closest station is in Kolchanovo.

In the beginning of the 19th century, a system of canals bypassing Lake Ladoga were built, which at the time were a part of Mariinsky Water System, connecting the Neva River and the Volga River. In particular, the Syas Canal connects the Syas and the Volkhov, and the Svir Canal connects the Syas and the Svir. The canals collectively are known as the Ladoga Canal.

== Culture and recreation ==
The district contains one cultural heritage monument of federal significance and additionally three objects classified as cultural and historical heritage of local significance. The federal monument is the tomb of the author Sergey Semyonov, who died in 1942 in Syasstroy Military Hospital from pneumonia. The local monuments are two tombs of soldiers fallen during World War II and a house where Sergey Kirov stayed when he visited the construction place of the paper mill.
