= Kapsha =

- Native name: Капша (Russian)

Location
- Country: Russia

Physical characteristics
- Source
  - location: Lake Kapshozero
- Mouth: Pasha
  - coordinates: 59°52′00″N 33°41′51″E
- Length: 115 km (71 mi)
- Basin size: 1,700 km^{2} (660 sq mi)

Basin features
- Progression: Pasha→ Svir→ Lake Ladoga→ Neva→ Gulf of Finland

Kapsha (Russian: Капша) is a river in Tikhvinsky and Lodeynopolsky Districts in the northeastern part of Leningrad Oblast of Russia, a right tributary of the Pasha (Lake Ladoga basin). The Kapsha is the largest tributary of the Pasha. It is 115 kilometres (71 mi) long, and the area of its basin 1,700 square kilometres (660 sq mi).

The source of the Kapsha is in Lake Kapshozero in the northeast of Tikhvinsky District. The river flows west and enters Lodeynopolsky District. At the village of Pirozero it turns south and re-enters Tikhvinsky District. The mouth of the Kapsha is in the village of Ust-Kapsha.

The drainage basin of the Kapsha includes the northeast of Tikhvinsky District, the south of Lodeynopolsky District, as well as tiny areas in the south of Podporozhsky District and in the north of Boksitogorsky District. In particular, a number of mid-size lakes, including Lake Lerinskoye and Lake Muromozero, belong to the catchment area of Lake Kapshozero.

Until the 1990s, the Kapsha was used for log driving. It is a popular destination for kayaking.

== See also ==
- List of rivers of Russia
- Vepsian Upland
