= Podborovye =

Podborovye (Russian: Подборовье) is the name of several rural localities in Russia:

- Podborovye, Podborovskoye Settlement Municipal Formation, Boksitogorsky District, Leningrad Oblast, a logging depot settlement in Podborovskoye Settlement Municipal Formation of Boksitogorsky District of Leningrad Oblast
- Podborovye, Samoylovskoye Settlement Municipal Formation, Boksitogorsky District, Leningrad Oblast, a village in Samoylovskoye Settlement Municipal Formation of Boksitogorsky District of Leningrad Oblast
- Podborovye, Vyborgsky District, Leningrad Oblast, a logging depot settlement in Seleznevskoye Settlement Municipal Formation of Vyborgsky District of Leningrad Oblast
- Podborovye, Batetsky District, Novgorod Oblast, a village in Moykinskoye Settlement of Batetsky District of Novgorod Oblast
- Podborovye, Parfinsky District, Novgorod Oblast, a village in Fedorkovskoye Settlement of Parfinsky District of Novgorod Oblast
- Podborovye, Starorussky District, Novgorod Oblast, a village in Mednikovskoye Settlement of Starorussky District of Novgorod Oblast
- Podborovye (Spitsinskaya Rural Settlement), Gdovsky District, Pskov Oblast, a village in Gdovsky District, Pskov Oblast; municipally, a part of Spitsinskaya Rural Settlement of that district
- Podborovye (Gdov Urban Settlement), Gdovsky District, Pskov Oblast, a village in Gdovsky District, Pskov Oblast; municipally, a part of Gdov Urban Settlement of that district
- Podborovye, Ostrovsky District, Pskov Oblast, a village in Ostrovsky District, Pskov Oblast
- Podborovye, Pskovsky District, Pskov Oblast, a village in Pskovsky District, Pskov Oblast
- Podborovye, Strugo-Krasnensky District, Pskov Oblast, a village in Strugo-Krasnensky District, Pskov Oblast
- Podborovye, Tver Oblast, a village in Lesnoy District of Tver Oblast
