= Pasha (river) =

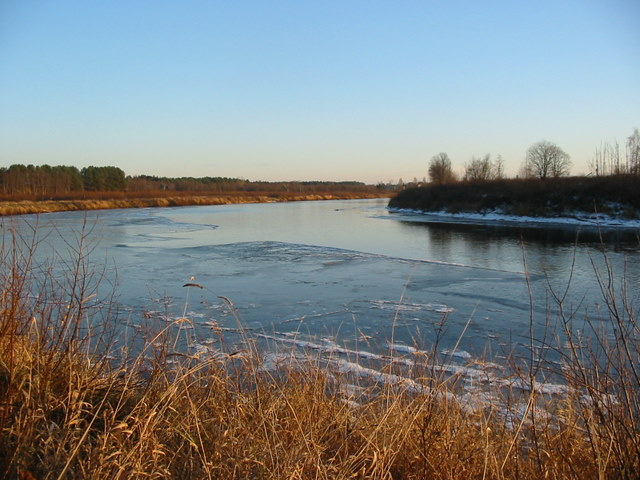

Location
- Country: Russia

Physical characteristics
- Source
  - location: Lake Pashozero
  - elevation: 115 m (377 ft)
- Mouth: Svir
  - coordinates: 60.4838°N 32.9186°E
- Length: 242 km (150 mi)
- Basin size: 6,650 km^{2} (2,570 sq mi)
- Discharge
  - average: 69 m^{3}/s (2,400 cu ft/s)

Basin features
- Progression: Svir→ Lake Ladoga→ Neva→ Gulf of Finland

The Pasha (Russian: Пашá) is a river in Tikhvinsky and Volkhovsky Districts in the northeastern part of Leningrad Oblast of Russia, a left tributary of the Svir (Lake Ladoga basin). The Pasha is the largest of Svir's tributaries. It is 242 kilometres (150 mi) long, and the area of its basin 6,650 square kilometres (2,570 sq mi). Its largest tributary is the Kapsha (right).

The source of the Pasha is in Lake Pashozero in Tikhvinsky District in the northeast of Leningrad Oblast. The river flows southwest, accepts the Kapsha from the right, and close to the village of Novoye Selo turns north. The Pasha crosses into Volkhovsky District and downstream of the village of Vonga turns northwest. It joins the Svir just 8 kilometres (5.0 mi) away from Svir's mouth, in the settlement of Sviritsa.

The drainage basin of the Pasha includes large areas in the northeast of Leningrad Oblast. These lie in the center and the east of Tikhvinsky District, in the south of Lodeynopolsky District, in the northeast of Boksitogorsky District, as well as in the northwest of Volkhovsky District. A number of big lakes lie in the Pasha basin, including Lake Pashozero, Lake Kapshozero, Lake Lerinskoye, and Lake Korvalskoye.

The lowest 25 kilometres (16 mi) of the river course, downstream of the settlement of Rybezhno, are listed as navigable in the State Water Register of Russia.

== See also ==
- List of rivers of Russia
- Vepsian Upland
