= Bochevo =

Bochevo (Russian: Бочево) is the name of several rural localities in Boksitogorsky District of Leningrad Oblast, Russia:

- Bochevo, Borskoye Settlement Municipal Formation, Boksitogorsky District, Leningrad Oblast, a village in Borskoye Settlement Municipal Formation
- Bochevo, Radogoshchinskoye Settlement Municipal Formation, Boksitogorsky District, Leningrad Oblast, a village in Radogoshchinskoye Settlement Municipal Formation
