= Yefimovskaya, Vladimir Oblast =

Yefimovskaya Ефимовская
- Village
- Location within Vladimir Oblast Location within Russia
- Coordinates: 55°59′N 40°33′E
- Country: Russia
- Region: Vladimir Oblast
- District: Sudogodsky District
- Time zone: UTC+3:00

Yefimovskaya (Russian: Ефимовская) is a rural locality (a village) in Golovinskoye Rural Settlement, Sudogodsky District, Vladimir Oblast, Russia. The population was 13 as of 2010.

== Geography ==
Yefimovskaya is located 25 km west of Sudogda (the district's administrative centre) by road. Zakharovo is the nearest rural locality.
