= Shugozero =

Shugozero Шугозеро
- Posyolok
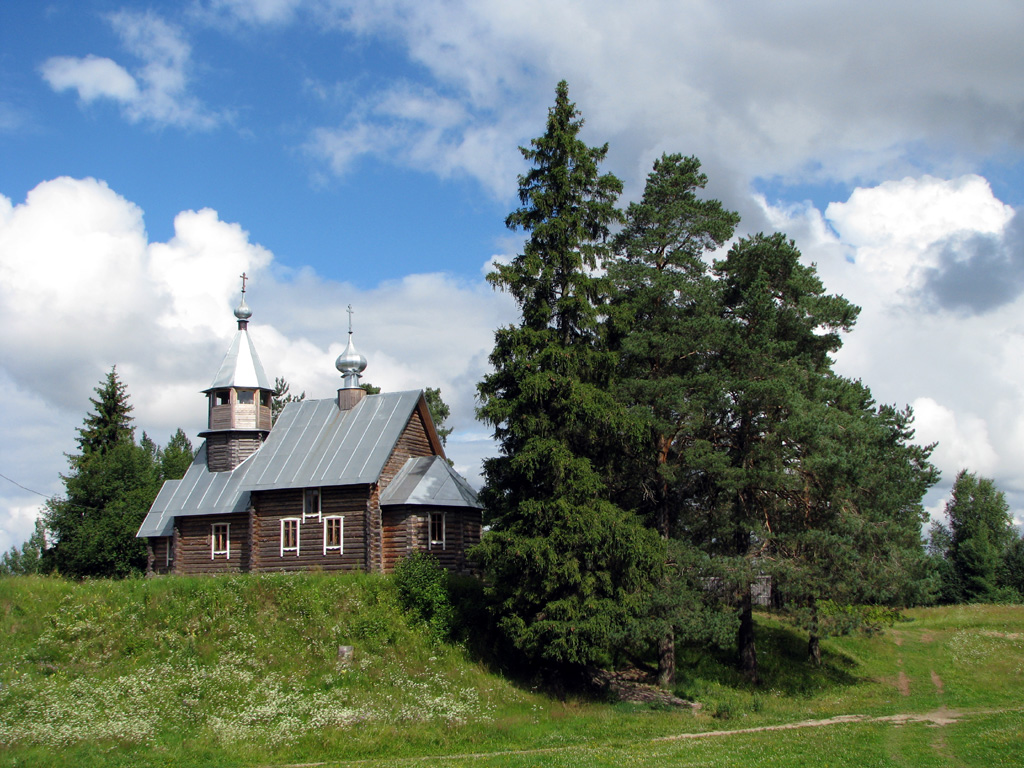
- Church in Shugozero

- Location within Leningrad Oblast Location within Russia
- Coordinates: 59°55′43″N 34°14′24″E
- Country: Russia
- Region: Leningrad Oblast
- District: Tikhvinsky District
- Time zone: UTC+3:00

Shugozero (Russian: Шугозеро, Veps: Šugar'v) is a rural locality (a posyolok) in Shugozyorskoye Rural Settlement of Tikhvinsky District, in Leningrad Oblast, Russia. Population: 2,060 (2010 census); 2,423 (2002 census);
