= Posyolok imeni Zhelyabova =

Posyolok imeni Zhelyabova Посёлок имени Желябова
- Settlement
- Location within Vologda Oblast Location within Russia
- Coordinates: 58°57′N 36°35′E
- Country: Russia
- Region: Vologda Oblast
- District: Ustyuzhensky District
- Time zone: UTC+3:00

Posyolok imeni Zhelyabova (Russian: Посёлок имени Желябова) is a rural locality (a settlement) and the administrative center of Posyolok imeni Zhelyabovo, Ustyuzhensky District, Vologda Oblast, Russia. The population was 33 as of 2002. There are 19 streets.

== Geography ==
The settlement is located 23 km (14 mi) northeast of Ustyuzhna (the district's administrative centre) by road. Lentyevo is the nearest rural locality.
