= Dymi, Russia =

Dymi (Russian: Дыми) is the name of several rural localities in Bolshedvorskoye Settlement Municipal Formation of Boksitogorsky District of Leningrad Oblast, Russia:

- Dymi (settlement of the crossing), a settlement of the crossing
- Dymi (village), a village
