= Syas =

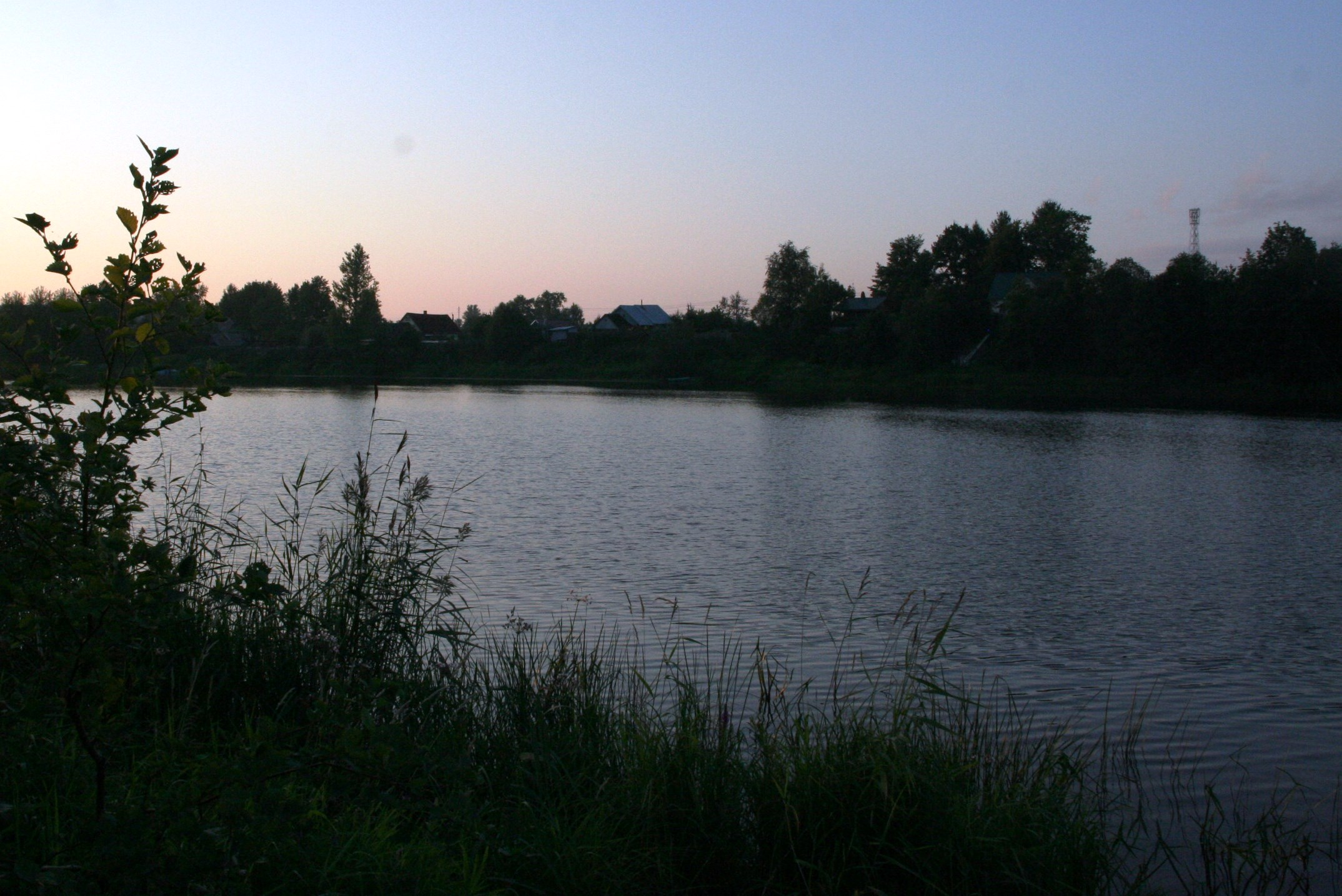
- River Syas some kilometers from Syasstroy
- Native name: Сясь (Russian)

Location
- Country: Russia

Physical characteristics
- Source
  - location: Valdai Hills
- Mouth: Lake Ladoga
  - coordinates: 60.1528°N 32.4886°E
  - elevation: 5 metres (16 ft)
- Length: 260 km (160 mi)
- Basin size: 7,330 km^{2} (2,830 sq mi)
- Discharge
  - average: 53 cubic metres per second (1,900 cu ft/s)

Basin features
- Progression: Lake Ladoga→ Neva→ Gulf of Finland

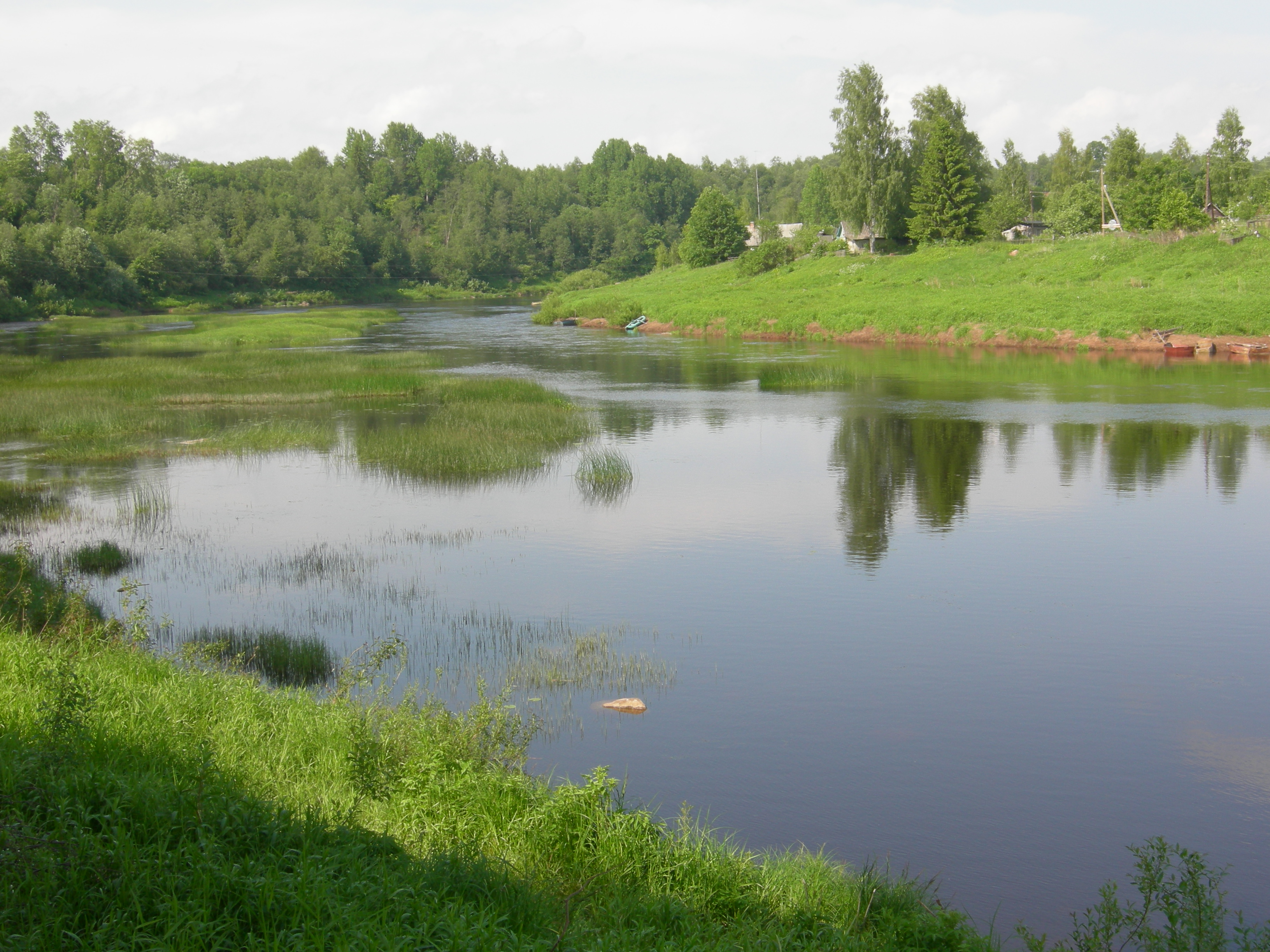
Syas River in Leningrad Oblast.

The Syas (Russian: Сясь) is a river in Lyubytinsky District of Novgorod Oblast and Tikhvinsky and Volkhovsky Districts of Leningrad Oblast, Russia. The Syas flows from the Valdai Hills north into Lake Ladoga. The town of Syasstroy is located at its mouth. It is 260 kilometres (160 mi) long, and the area of its basin 7,330 square kilometres (2,830 sq mi). The largest tributary of the Syas is the Tikhvinka (right).

The source of the Syas is in the Valday Hills north of the settlement of Nebolchi. The river flows north and enters Leningrad Oblast. It crosses the Tikhvin Ridge from the south to the north. Further north, it accepts the Tikhvinka from the right and turns west. There it accepts the Lunenka from the left, turns northwest and crosses into Volkhovsky District. The mouth of the Syas is downstream from the city of Syasstroy.

The river basin of the Syas comprises parts of Volkhovsky, Tikhvinsky, and Boksitogorsky Districts of Leningrad Oblast and Lyubytinsky District of Novgorod Oblast. In the west and the south, it is separated from the river basin of the Volkhov, in the north it is separated from the river basin of the Svir, and in the east it is separated from the river basin of the Volga. The Syas is connected with the Volga through the Tikhvinka, the Tikhvin Water System, and the Chagodoshcha and the Mologa.

The Syas freezes up in November (sometimes in December or even January) and stays under the ice until April.

During the late Vendel Age and the early Viking Age, the Syas was popular as an alternative route to the Volkhov for penetrating from the Baltic Sea through portages to the Volga. A fortress of Alaborg was built by the Vikings to guard the approaches to the Syas rapids. The route had declined by the 10th century.
