= Yefimovskaya, Vozhegodsky District, Vologda Oblast =

Yefimovskaya Ефимовская
- Village
- Location within Vologda Oblast Location within Russia
- Coordinates: 60°27′N 40°05′E
- Country: Russia
- Region: Vologda Oblast
- District: Vozhegodsky District
- Time zone: UTC+3:00

Yefimovskaya (Russian: Ефимовская) is a rural locality (a village) in Vizhegodskoye Urban Settlement, Vozhegodsky District, Vologda Oblast, Russia. The population was 2 as of 2002.

== Geography ==
Yefimovskaya is located 8 km southwest of Vozhega (the district's administrative centre) by road. Senkinskaya is the nearest rural locality.
