= Dormition Monastery, Tikhvin =

Russian orthodox monastery founded in 1560 in Tikhvin

Coordinates: 59°39′07″N 33°31′12″E

Tikhvin Monastery of the Dormition
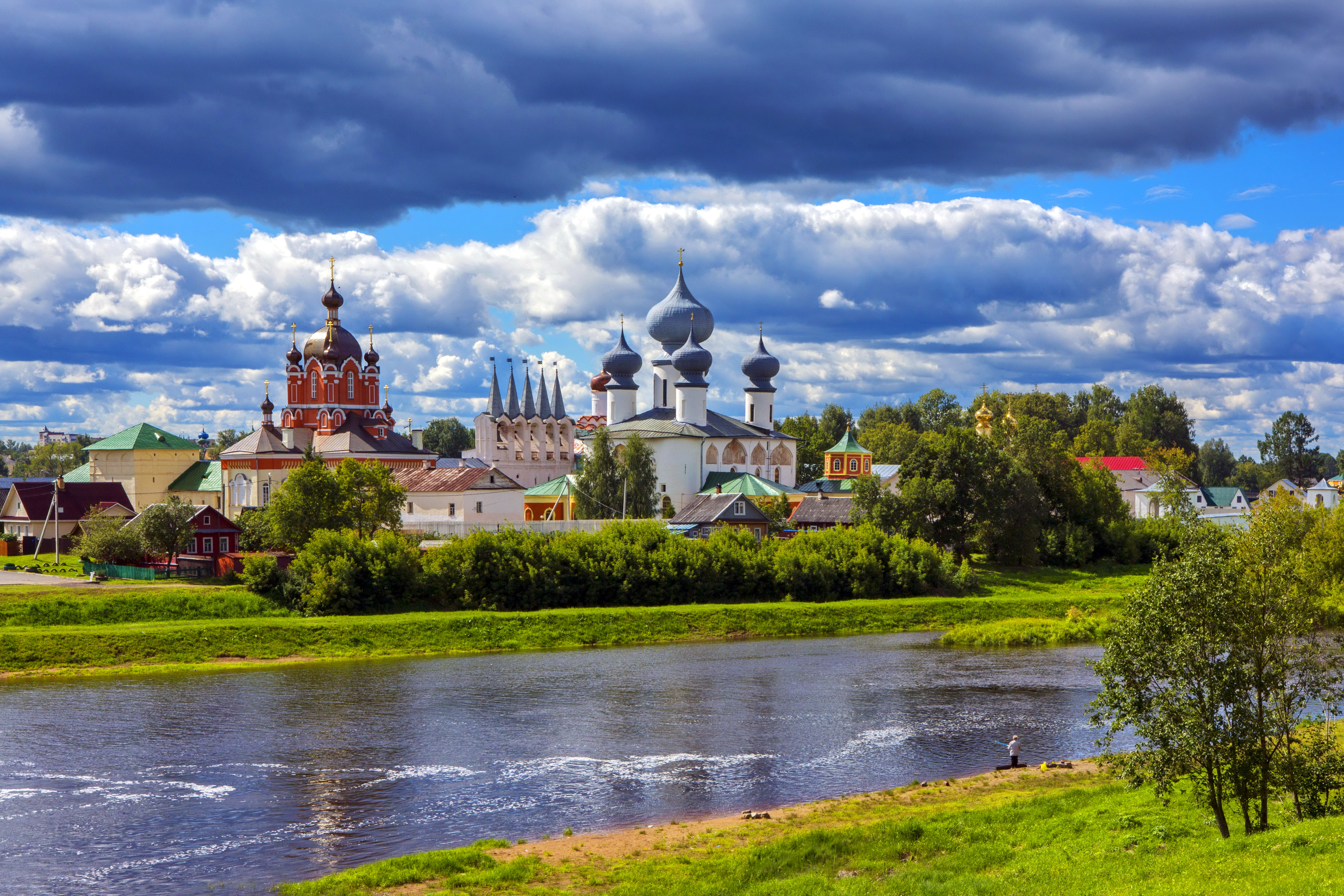
- The panorama of the monastery from the Tikhvinka River
- Interactive map of Tikhvin Monastery of the Dormition

Monastery information
- Full name: Тихвинский Богородичный Успенский монастырь
- Denomination: Russian Orthodox
- Established: 1560
- Diocese: Saint Petersburg and Ladoga Eparchy

Site
- Location: Tikhvin, Leningrad Oblast, Russia
- Public access: Yes

The Tikhvin Monastery of the Dormition of the Mother of God (Russian: Тихвинский Богородичный Успенский монастырь) is a Russian Orthodox monastery founded in 1560. The monastery is located in the town of Tikhvin, on the left bank of the Tikhvinka River. It hosts the icon of the Theotokos of Tikhvin, one of the most venerated Russian icons.

== History ==
According to the tradition, the icon of the Theotokos of Tikhvin was discovered in 1383 at the current location of the monastery. A wooden church was built to accommodate the icon. The consequent wooden churches burned to the ground three times, until in 1507 the construction of a stone church started by the order of Vasily III, the Grand Prince of Moscow. In 1560, the monastery was founded and built as a fortress, since at the time it was located close to the Swedish border, and could be used for defense purposes. In 1610, during the Time of Troubles, the monastery was looted by Polish troops, and subsequently it was occupied by Swedish forces until 1613. In the 1920s, after the Russian Revolution, the monastery was closed, but the icon was still held there. After World War II, the Tikhvin Town Museum occupied the monastery. In 1995, the monastery was given back to the Russian Orthodox Church.

In 1941, during World War II, for a month Tikhvin was occupied by German troops, who looted the monastery and, in particular, took the icon to Pskov, and in 1944 transferred it to Riga. The icon eventually was taken out of Russia for safety by a Russian Orthodox bishop from Kolka parish. In the period between 1949 and 2004 the icon was stored in Chicago. It was returned to the monastery in 2004.

== Architecture ==
The oldest building of the monastery is the katholikon, built by Basil III between 1507 and 1515, before the monastery was founded. It is a five-domed church with six pillars and three apses, typical of 16th-century Russian architecture. On three sides, the church is surrounded by covered galleries. The interior is covered with frescoes.

The refectory of the monastery dates from 1581: it is a massive two-storey building and contains a church. The belfry of the monastery was constructed in 1600 and has an unusual shape with a number of domes. The cells were built at the end of the 17th century.

The monastery has an approximately rectangular shape and is surrounded by a wall with towers.
