= Theotokos of Tikhvin =

Famous Orthodox Christian icon

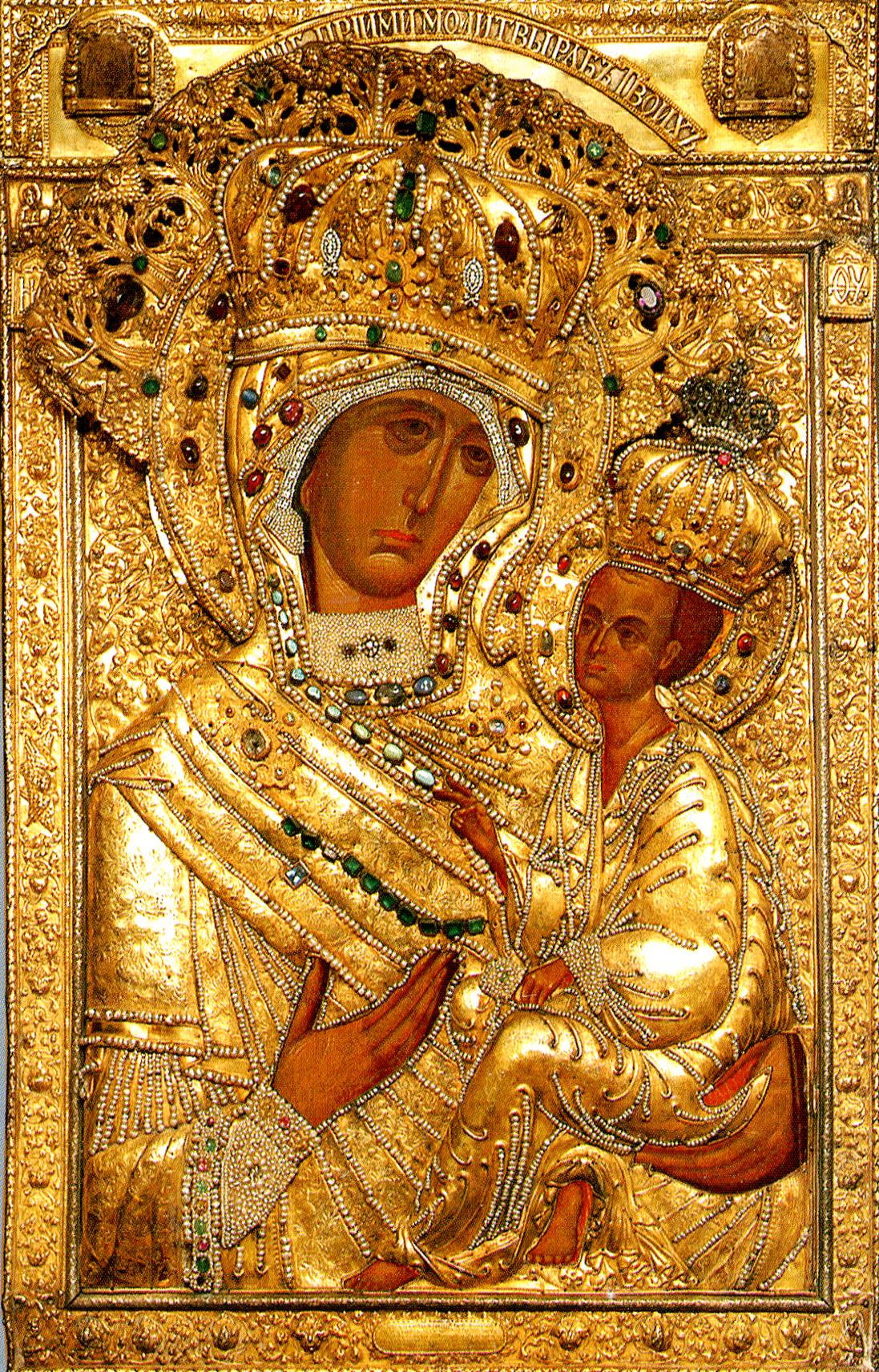
The Theotokos of Tikhvin in its golden riza

The Theotokos of Tikhvin (Russian: Тихвинская икона Божией Матери) is one of the most celebrated Orthodox Christian icons. It is said to be one of the icons painted by St. Luke the Evangelist. Some art historians prefer a date of about 1300 and a Russian artist, which matches another tradition that the icon miraculously appeared hovering over a lake near Tikhvin, Russia in 1383.

== History ==
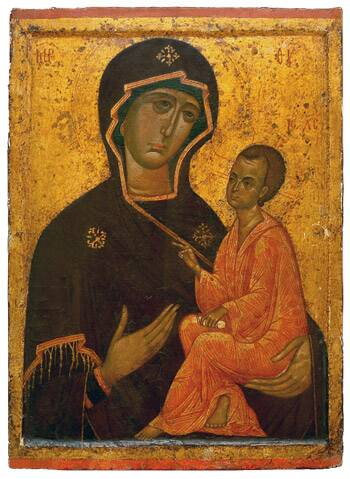
The Theotokos of Tikhvin

According to tradition, in the 5th century, the icon was transferred from Jerusalem to Constantinople, where a church was built specially for it. These are the same traditions as accrue to the Hodegetria icon, suggesting the stories have become conflated; in terms of composition the Tikhvin icon is of the Hodegetria type. Some art historians prefer a date of about 1300, and a Russian artist. This matches a further tradition that the icon miraculously appeared, hovering over a lake, in Russia near Tikhvin in 1383.

Since the 14th century, the icon was held in Tikhvin, where eventually Tikhvin Assumption Monastery was founded to host it. After the closure of the monastery in the 1920s, the icon became an exhibit of the local history museum. Until 1941, the icon was kept in the Tikhvin Museum.

In 1941, during World War II, the town was occupied for a month by German troops, who looted the museum and took the icon to Pskov, and in 1944 transferred it to Riga. The icon was eventually taken to the United States for safety by the former Latvian Orthodox Church Bishop of Riga, John Garklāvs. Between 1949 and 2004, the icon remained at Holy Trinity Orthodox Cathedral in Chicago, Illinois.

In August 1978, the Theotokos of Tikhvin was brought by Garklāvs, who had become the Orthodox Church in America's Archbishop of Chicago and Minneapolis, to St. Mary's Russian Orthodox Church in Holdingford, Minnesota for veneration.

It was returned to Tikhvin in 2004 by John's adopted son, Fr. Sergei Garklāvs of Chicago. In return, Bishop of Tikhvin Mstislav gave the cathedral an exact reproduction of the icon, complete with a bejeweled riza, in 2016. The icon is kept at the Tikhvin Assumption Monastery, where it was kept prior to 1941. Most of the icon, except the exposed skin of Jesus and Mary (the two faces and necks, both sets of hands, and the feet of Jesus), is normally covered by a chased frame of precious metals and jewels (riza).

== Iconography and copies ==
The Tikhvin icon belongs to the Hodegetria–Eleusa (“Tenderness”) variant of the Hodegetria iconographic type. Its distinguishing features include the profile position of the Christ Child, the turned-under foot of His right leg, and the drapery of the upper garment with a shawl-like collar.

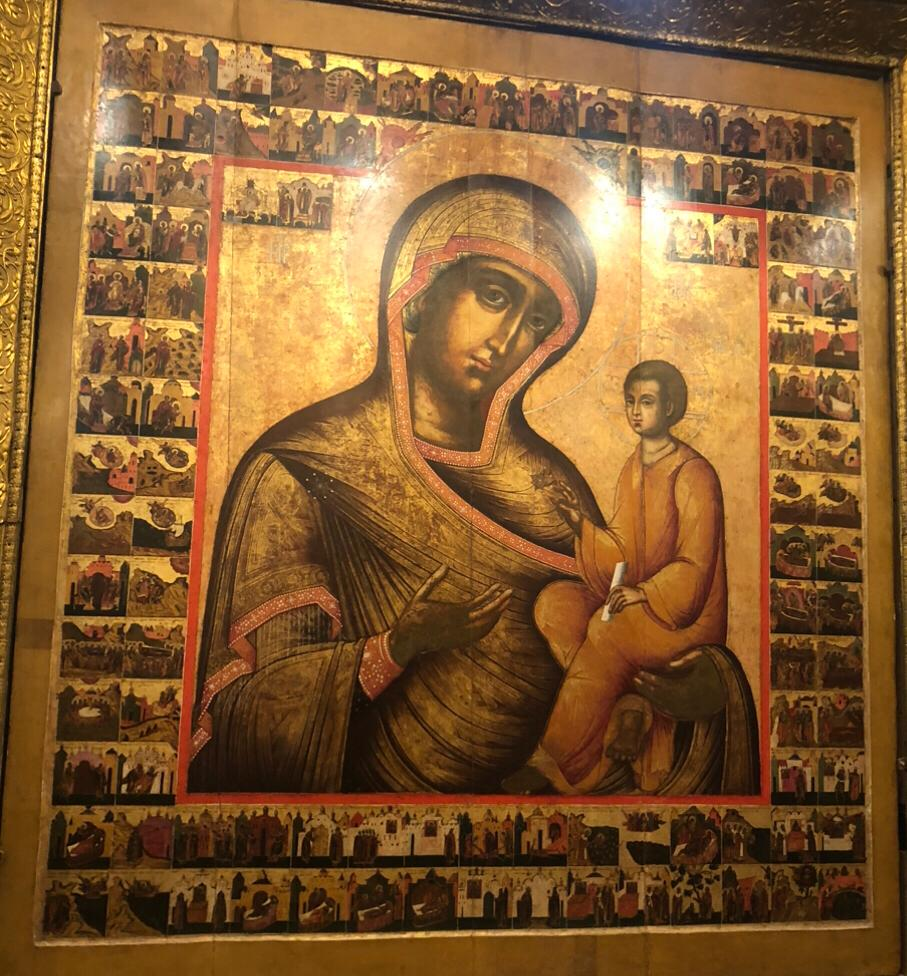
The Tikhvin Icon with the Life and the Tale. North wall of the Dormition Cathedral of the Moscow Kremlin, 1668.

Among the many early copies faithfully reproducing the original are the icons “The Tikhvin Mother of God with the Holy Trinity, angels, and saints in the margins” from the Peter and Paul chapel of the Dormition Cathedral of the Moscow Kremlin (dated c. 1526), and “The Tikhvin Mother of God with the Akathist to the Mother of God” from the Church of St. Basil on the Hill in Pskov, dating to the first half of the 16th century.

Similar copies were produced in the Tikhvin Monastery—by the monk Aaron in 1711 (formerly in the collection of V. A. Bondarenko)—as well as in the icon-painting villages of Mstyora and Palekh.

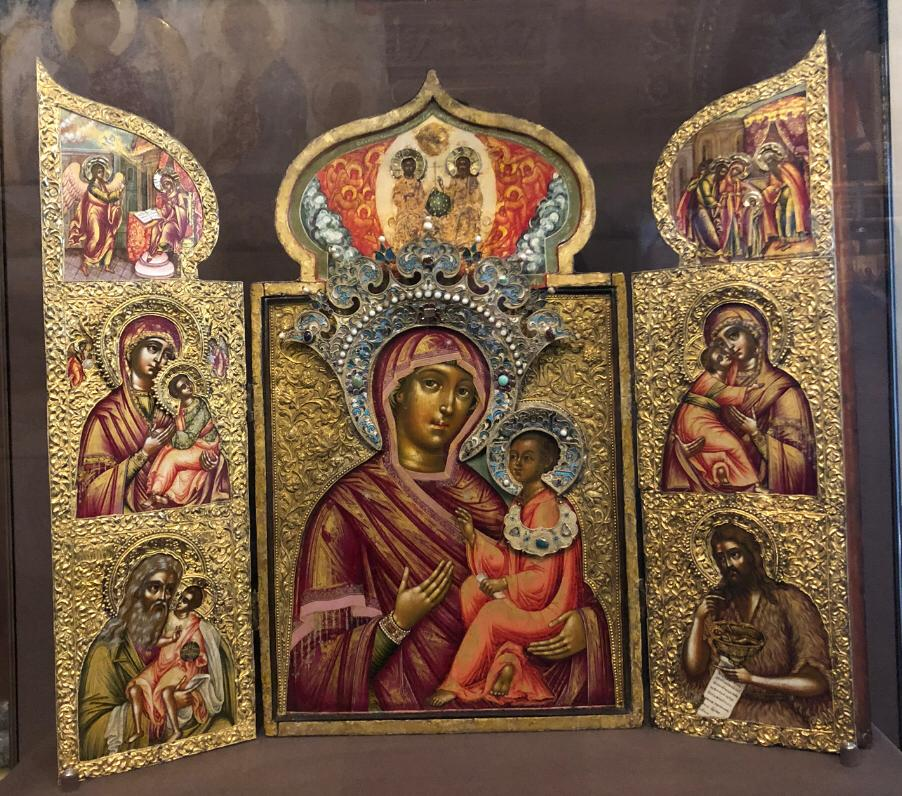
Folding icon (Triptych) with the Tikhvin Icon. Workshops of the Moscow Kremlin, 1670s, Annunciation Cathedral of the Moscow Kremlin.

Copies with narrative panels (kleima) depicting the history and miracles of the icon are known in the cathedrals of the Moscow Kremlin—the Annunciation Cathedral (an icon of the second half of the 16th century (?), one of the panels possibly depicting Ivan the Terrible) and the Dormition Cathedral (dated 1667; the copy was painted by Fyodor Elizariev and Gavriil Kondratiev, and includes 102 panels illustrating the life of the Mother of God and the history of the Tikhvin icon).

In 1655, Rodion Sergiev, head of the icon-painting workshop of the Tikhvin Monastery, created six four-part icons depicting scenes of the apparitions and miracles of the Tikhvin image (only one survives, now in the State Russian Museum). In 1658, he also produced a cycle of miniatures for a manuscript of the Tale of the Tikhvin Icon. Illustrated copies of the Tale from the 17th to 19th centuries could include up to 124 miniatures.
