= Tikhvin =

Town in Leningrad Oblast, Russia

Tikhvin Тихвин
- Town
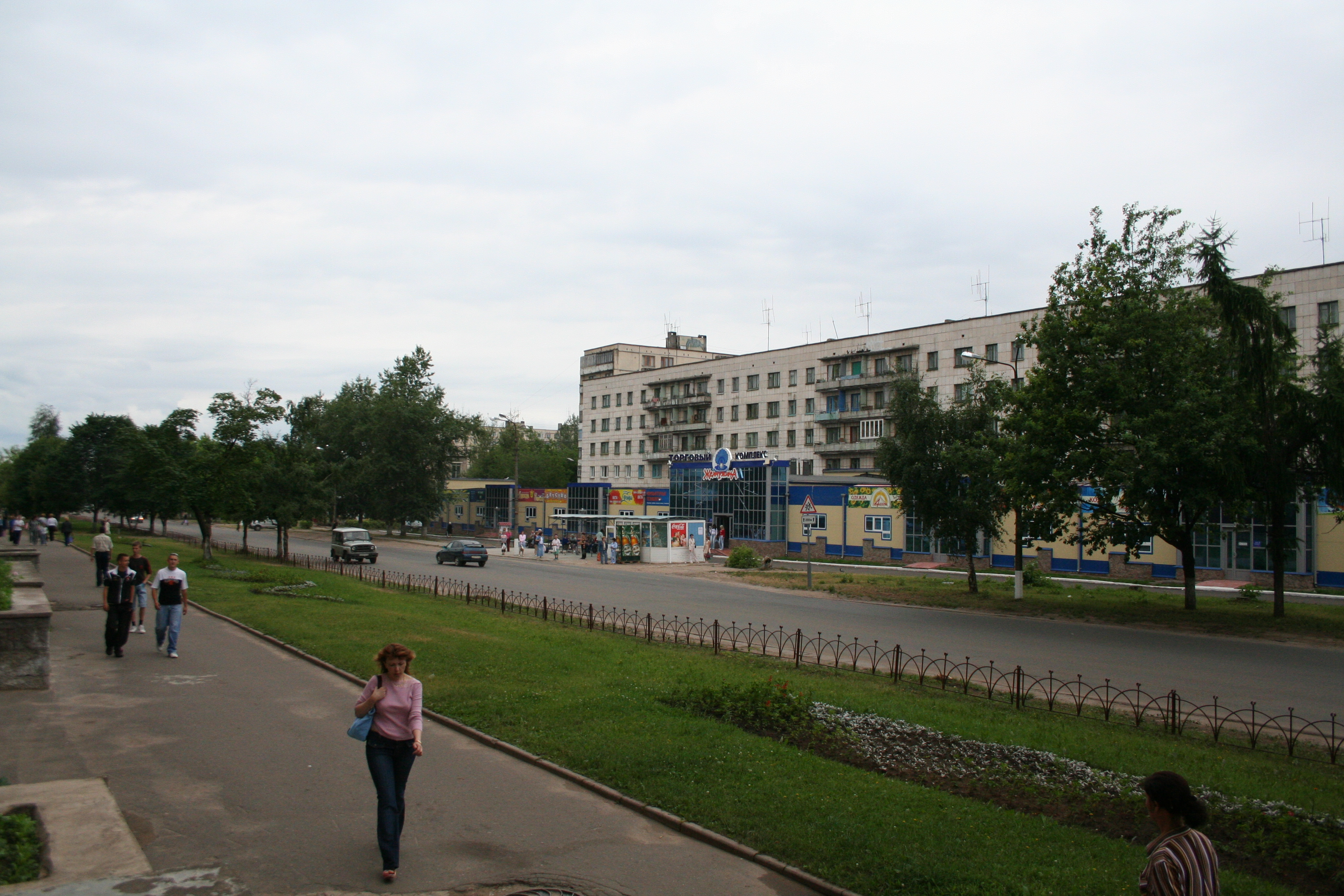
- Karla Marksa Street, the longest in Tikhvin

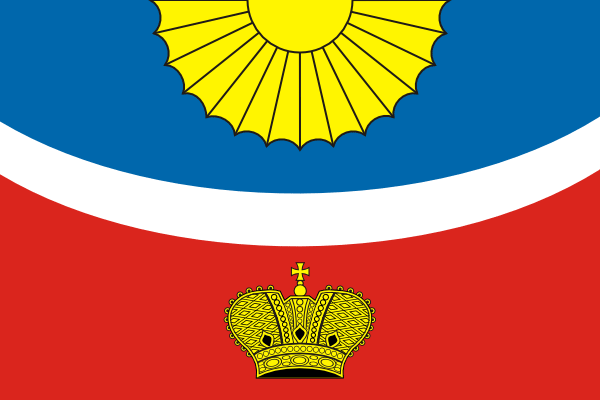
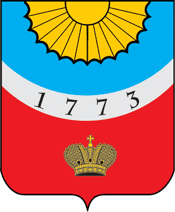
- Flag Coat of arms
- Interactive map of Tikhvin
- Location of Tikhvin Tikhvin (Leningrad Oblast)
- Coordinates: 59°39′N 33°32′E
- Country: Russia
- Federal subject: Leningrad Oblast
- Administrative district: Tikhvinsky District
- Settlement municipal formationSelsoviet: Tikhvinskoye Settlement Municipal Formation
- First mentioned: 1383
- Town status since: 1773
- Elevation: 50 m (160 ft)

Population (2010 Census)
  - Total: 58,459
  - Estimate (2025): 53,778 (−8%)
  - Rank: 284th in 2010

Administrative status
  - Capital of: Tikhvinsky District, Tikhvinskoye Settlement Municipal Formation

Municipal status
  - Municipal district: Tikhvinsky Municipal District
  - Urban settlement: Tikhvinskoye Urban Settlement
  - Capital of: Tikhvinsky Municipal District, Tikhvinskoye Urban Settlement
- Time zone: UTC+3 (MSK)
- Postal codes: 187549–187553, 187555–187557
- Dialing code: +7 81367
- OKTMO ID: 41645101001
- Town Day: July 9

Tikhvin (Russian: Ти́хвин; Veps: Tihvin) is a town and the administrative center of Tikhvinsky District in Leningrad Oblast, Russia, located on both banks of the Tikhvinka River in the east of the oblast, 200 kilometers (120 mi) east of St. Petersburg. Tikhvin is also an industrial and cultural center of the district, as well as its transportation hub. Population: 58,459 (2010 census); 63,338 (2002 census); 71,352 (1989 Soviet census).

It was previously known as Predtechensky pogost, Tikhvinsky posad.

== Etymology ==
According to one version supported by Max Vasmer, the name of the town originates from Old East Slavic тихъ (Russian: тихий), which means "quiet". According to another version, it is derived from Finnish tihkua — "trickle out".

== History ==
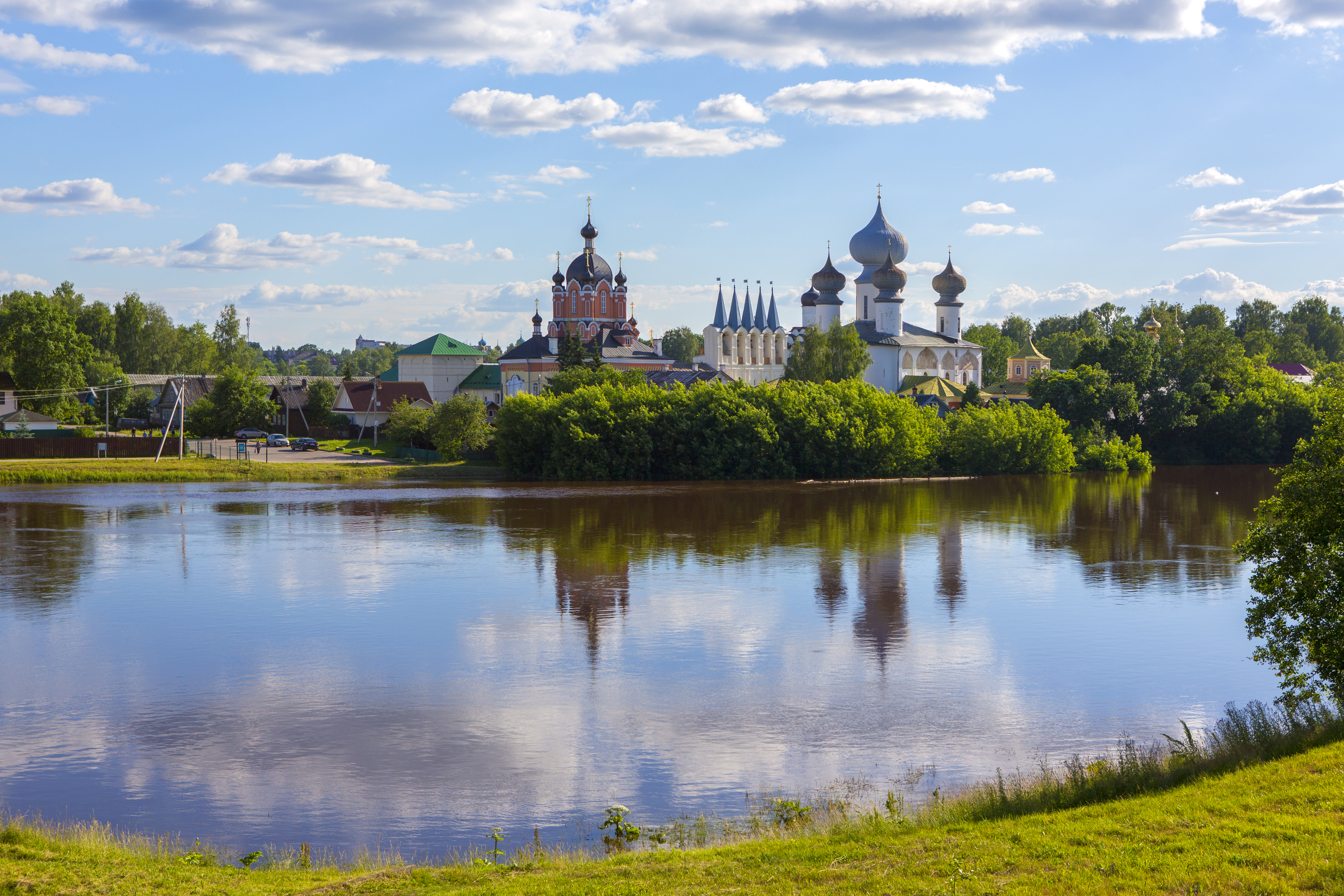
Dormition Monastery

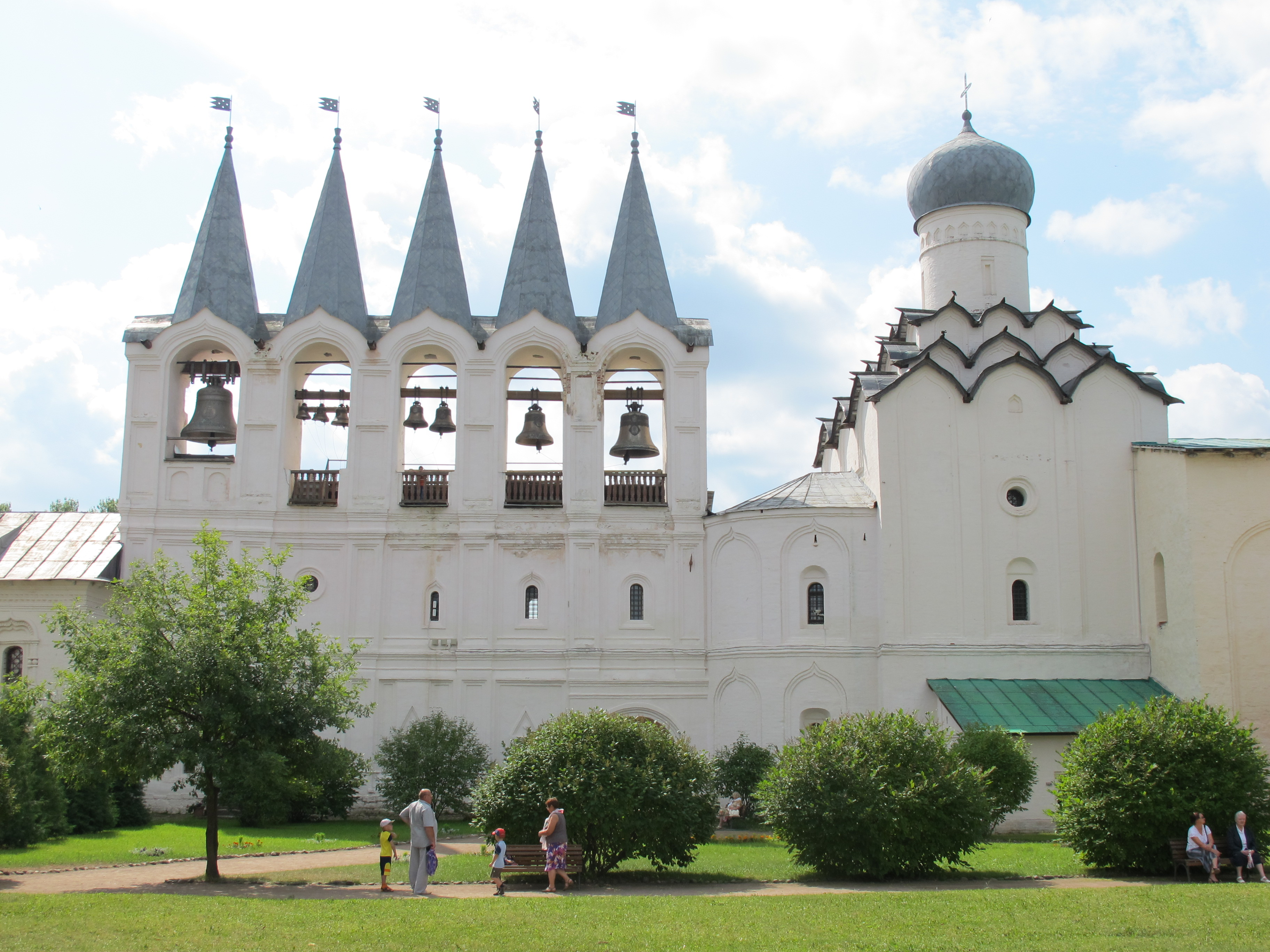
Belfry of Tikhvinsky Monastery

Tikhvin was first mentioned in 1383 as Predtechensky pogost (Предтеченский погост), when a chronicle reported that a wooden Church of the Dormition was built here. Later, in 1495–1496, Y. K. Saburov, a clerk in the Novgorod Cadastre, mentioned the "...Tikhvin parish and in it, a wooden church..."

Its location at the intersection of trade routes which connected the Volga River with Lake Ladoga and the Baltic Sea ensured its rapid development. At the beginning of the 16th century, it was already a widely known commerce and trade center. In 1507–1515, funded by Vasili III of Russia, on the spot of the burned wooden church, Dmitry Syrkov of Novgorod constructed the monumental stone Cathedral of Dormition, which stands to this day.

In 1560, by order of Ivan the Terrible, the Monastery of Dormition was built on the left bank of the Tikhvinka River. Management of the construction project was entrusted to Fyodor Syrkov, the son of Dmitry Syrkov. Special importance was placed on the haste of its construction; therefore, the Tsar permitted the use of peasants from twenty rural divisions to assist in building it.

In the spring and summer of 1560, the large Monastery of Dormition and the smaller Vvedensky convent were simultaneously built, as well as two trade and industrial settlements with various buildings for residential, economic, and religious purposes. The monastery was initially surrounded by a stockade of sharpened poles. Later, in the mid-17th century, it was replaced by two parallel log walls, filled in between with earth and stones. A covered walkway with arrow slits went along the top of walls and above the walls nine powerful towers were raised. Thus, on the spot of an ancient settlement, an important fortified stronghold was created, which would play a large role in the defense of the northwestern borders of Russia.

At the beginning of the 17th century, the Russian state underwent a deep internal crisis. During the Swedish-Polish incursion, the Swedes occupied and devastated the region around Novgorod. In 1613, Tikhvin was captured, ransacked, and burned. Tradespeople, sheltering behind the fortress walls of the monastery, survived a prolonged siege and numerous attacks before routing the Swedish army. The fight ended with the expulsion of the Swedes from the area, marking the beginning of the liberation of the Novgorod region from Swedish and Polish forces.

Tikhvin blossomed economically during the 17th and 18th centuries. The products of Tikhvin's blacksmiths enjoyed special demand and were bought not only in Russian cities but also abroad. Tikhvin became one of the points for foreign trade in Russia and Tikhvin Fair was one of the largest in the country. The bloom in trade and crafts in the 17th century contributed to an increase of the settlement's population, which grew considerably.

Stone buildings were permitted only on the territory of the monastery. In the 16th century, in addition to the cathedral, a stone refectory was built, and a church dedicated to the birth of the Mother of God was erected in 1581. In 1600, a five-roofed belfry was constructed. An especially intense period of stone construction took place in the second half of the 17th century, when all the wooden buildings in the monastery were replaced by ones of stone. As a result of these works, a highly artistic ensemble of historical and architectural monuments was created on the territory of the monastery, which is mostly preserved to this day, although in the 18th and 19th centuries some of the cloister buildings underwent reconstruction which altered their original appearance.

Since their construction in 1560, Tikhvin owed its allegiance to the monastery and convent. In 1723, after a prolonged fight, the inhabitants of Tikhvin were freed from monastery control and obtained their own administration, a magistrate who answered to Novgorod Province office. The settlement was not totally separated from the monastery until 1764, after an edict concerning the transfer of the monastery's property to the state. In 1773, Tikhvin was granted town status.

Tikhvin has considerable deposits of bauxite, a component involved in the manufacture of aluminum. These reserves were of "decisive significance" to the German war effort in World War II. An operation to capture Tikhvin was launched by 12th Panzer Division on 19 October 1941. The city was occupied by Nazi troops from 8 November 1941 to 9 December 1941. Due to counterattacks on the part of Soviet forces, it had to be abandoned after one month, but many architectural monuments were destroyed during that time. The re-capture of Tikhvin is considered to have been extremely vital in the execution of the Road of Life during the Siege of Leningrad, thanks to its railway. It allowed the Soviets to provide much more foodstuffs in comparison to the makeshift land road previously used.

== Geography ==
The town is located on both banks of the Tikhvinka River in the east of the oblast, 200 kilometers (120 mi) east of St. Petersburg.

=== Climate ===
Climate data for Tikhvin
Month	Jan	Feb	Mar	Apr	May	Jun	Jul	Aug	Sep	Oct	Nov	Dec	Year
Record high °C (°F)	7.2 (45.0)	9.2 (48.6)	17.0 (62.6)	27.3 (81.1)	35.0 (95.0)	35.9 (96.6)	37.8 (100.0)	35.6 (96.1)	30.4 (86.7)	23.1 (73.6)	11.6 (52.9)	10.3 (50.5)	37.8 (100.0)
Mean daily maximum °C (°F)	−4.5 (23.9)	−3.7 (25.3)	2.1 (35.8)	10.0 (50.0)	17.2 (63.0)	21.3 (70.3)	23.7 (74.7)	21.4 (70.5)	15.5 (59.9)	7.6 (45.7)	0.9 (33.6)	−2.6 (27.3)	9.1 (48.3)
Daily mean °C (°F)	−7.3 (18.9)	−7.1 (19.2)	−2.4 (27.7)	4.3 (39.7)	10.9 (51.6)	15.5 (59.9)	17.9 (64.2)	15.7 (60.3)	10.5 (50.9)	4.4 (39.9)	−1.3 (29.7)	−4.9 (23.2)	4.7 (40.4)
Mean daily minimum °C (°F)	−10.3 (13.5)	−10.8 (12.6)	−6.9 (19.6)	−1.0 (30.2)	4.4 (39.9)	9.4 (48.9)	12.3 (54.1)	10.6 (51.1)	6.2 (43.2)	1.4 (34.5)	−3.7 (25.3)	−7.6 (18.3)	0.3 (32.6)
Record low °C (°F)	−50.9 (−59.6)	−40.7 (−41.3)	−34.8 (−30.6)	−26.0 (−14.8)	−9.1 (15.6)	−3.3 (26.1)	0.1 (32.2)	−2.0 (28.4)	−8.7 (16.3)	−17.8 (0.0)	−31.2 (−24.2)	−44.5 (−48.1)	−50.9 (−59.6)
Average precipitation mm (inches)	61.5 (2.42)	42.2 (1.66)	42.9 (1.69)	42.7 (1.68)	57.5 (2.26)	79.2 (3.12)	83.5 (3.29)	84.6 (3.33)	64.3 (2.53)	69.7 (2.74)	69.8 (2.75)	67.3 (2.65)	765.2 (30.12)
Source: Pogodaiklimat.ru

== Administrative and municipal status ==
Within the framework of administrative divisions, Tikhvin serves as the administrative center of Tikhvinsky District. As an administrative division, it is, together with nineteen rural localities, incorporated within Tikhvinsky District as Tikhvinskoye Settlement Municipal Formation. As a municipal division, Tikhvinskoye Settlement Municipal Formation is incorporated within Tikhvinsky Municipal District as Tikhvinskoye Urban Settlement.

== Economy ==
=== Industry ===
In Soviet times, the largest employer in Tikhvin was a heavy machine factory, known as Transmash up to 2001, where tractors and defense equipment were manufactured. In its heyday, 20,000 people were employed there. The plant was very negatively affected by the dissolution of the Soviet Union and post-Soviet economic problems. Tractor production ceased in 2003 and by 2005, its workforce was reduced to about a thousand. The plant was acquired in 2001 by the ICT Group and restructured, a ferroalloy plant (acquired by Mechel in 2008), and rail wagon building plant were constructed in the first decade of the 21st century.

Other industrial enterprises in the town include the manufacturing of furniture for IKEA, a construction company, a wood-chemical plant (producing rosin, resin, turpentine, and other such wood-based chemicals), a meat-packing plant, a dairy plant, a bread factory, and other light enterprises.

=== Transportation ===
A railway connecting St. Petersburg and Vologda passes Tikhvin. A secondary railway branches out south, connecting Tikhvin with Budogoshch.

The A114 Highway, connecting Vologda with Cherepovets and St. Petersburg, passes Tikhvin as well. There are also local roads.

The whole course of the Tikhvinka River is a part of the Tikhvinskaya water system, one of the waterways constructed in the early 19th century to connect the basins of the Volga and the Neva Rivers. The waterway runs from the Syas upstream the Tikhvinka. Lake Yelgino is connected by the Tikhvin Canal, 6 kilometers (3.7 mi) with the upper course of the Volchina River. The waterway then follows downstream the Gorun River, the Chagodoshcha River, and the Mologa River. Currently, it is not used for any commercial navigation. Most of the locks built on the Tikhvinka decayed and are not in use.

== Architecture ==
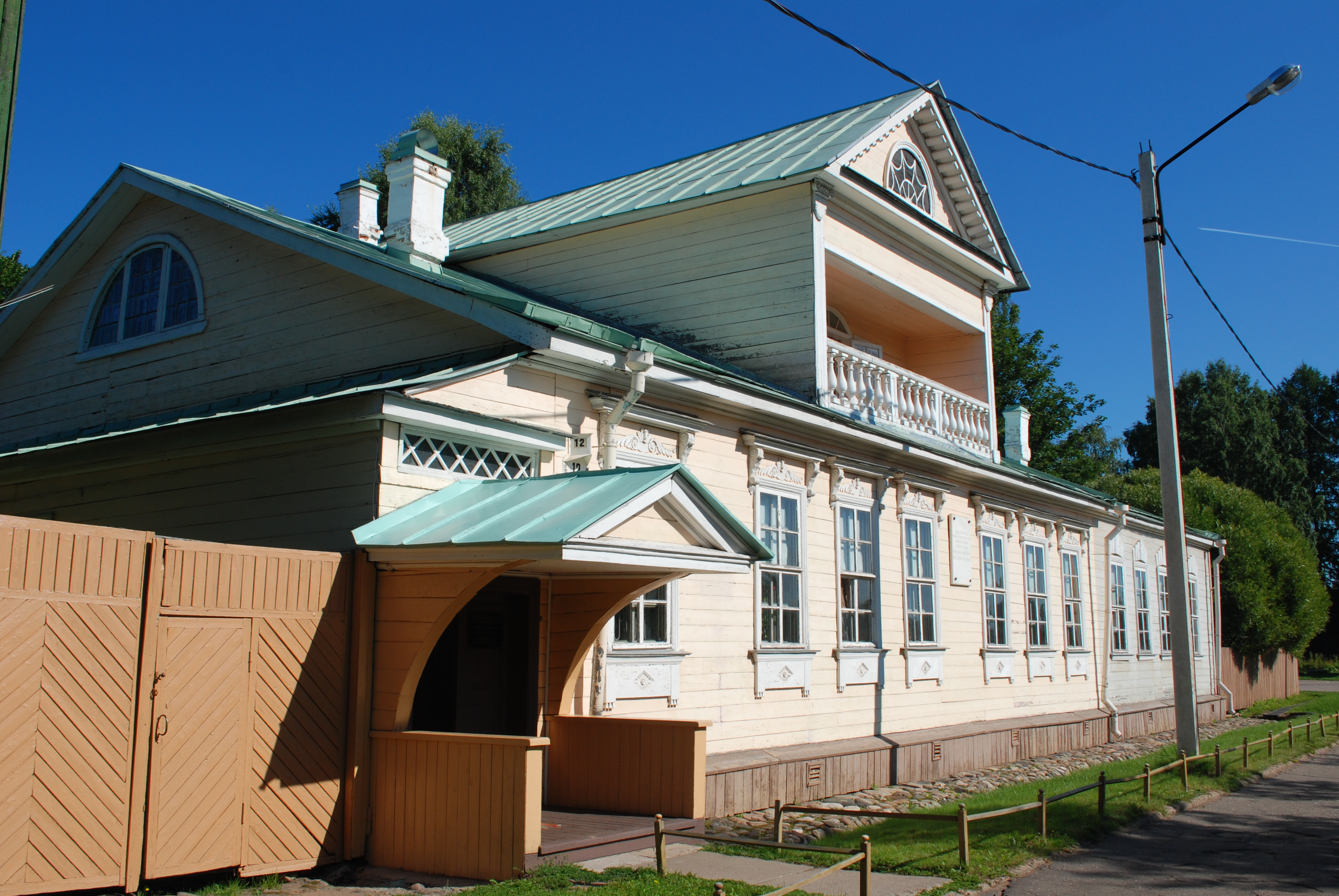
Nikolai Rimsky-Korsakov house museum

Today, Tikhvin is divided into two parts: the "old town", which preserves the look of a small provincial town, and the "new town", consisting of apartment blocks built after World War II in the typical Soviet style. The majority of the population lives in the "new town". The houses and buildings of the "old town" are mostly wooden; in the center square, which until the 20th century was the commercial heart of the town, stands a restored cathedral, Savior of the Transfiguration, which is the main church in the town. In addition to the cathedral, a number of notable buildings are preserved around the square, including the hotel "St. Petersburg" (now Sberbank) and the "Guest Court", which was closed for many years after the dissolution of the Soviet Union, but has been completely restored and now functions as a shopping center.

An additional point of interest is the historical part of the town with old wooden buildings and planning characteristic of the 18th century. The ruins of wooden sluices from the 19th century has been preserved as well; these are the remains of the Tikhvinskaya water system.

== Culture ==
The famous Russian composer, Nikolai Rimsky-Korsakov, was born in Tikhvin. His house has been converted into a museum.

=== Festivals ===
- "Tikhvin Lel": begun in 1991, a yearly children's artistic competition and festival of traditional dance associations. In 2000 more than 80 associations from different cities of Russia and countries of the CIS participated, with more than 1000 participants. There are three categories of competition: classical dance, folk dance, and variety dance. Many associations attend the festival several years in a row. Since 1998, players of folk instruments have been able to take part in the competition as soloists, duets, ensembles and orchestras. In 2000, 76 contestants participated in this portion of the festival.
- "September in Tikhvin": an open festival of wind and jazz music that began in 2000 and is organized in part by the Rimsky-Korsakov School of Arts. The festival's aims are to encourage connections between musicians of different countries, train young people with the best examples of world jazz, and raise the level of musical education in art and music schools. Famous jazz musicians and jazz associations from Russia and abroad have participated in the festival throughout the years; participants from other countries have included those from Finland, Denmark, Sweden, and Great Britain. One of the initiators of the festival was the Tikhvin jazz quartet (created in 1994), which has repeatedly represented Tikhvin in festivals in France, Germany, and Finland.

== Religion ==
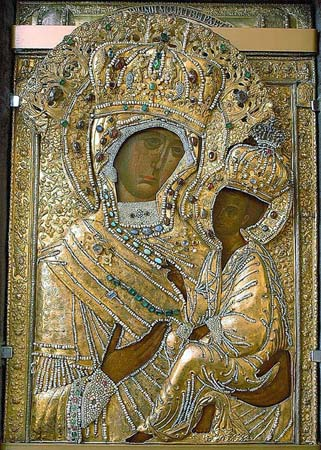
The Theotokos of Tikhvin icon

The main architectural and historical sight of town is the Monastery of the Dormition, founded in 1560. The monastery is famed for the Theotokos of Tikhvin icon. According to legend, it appeared on the shore of the Tikhvinka River on June 26 (July 9), 1383; later at this place the monastery and town would be built.

== Notable people ==
- Nikolai Rimsky-Korsakov (1844–1908), composer
- Voin Rimsky-Korsakov (1822–1871), his brother, naval figure

== Twin towns – sister cities ==
Tikhvin is twinned with:

- Hérouville-Saint-Clair, France
- Imatra, Finland
