= Tikhvinskaya water system =

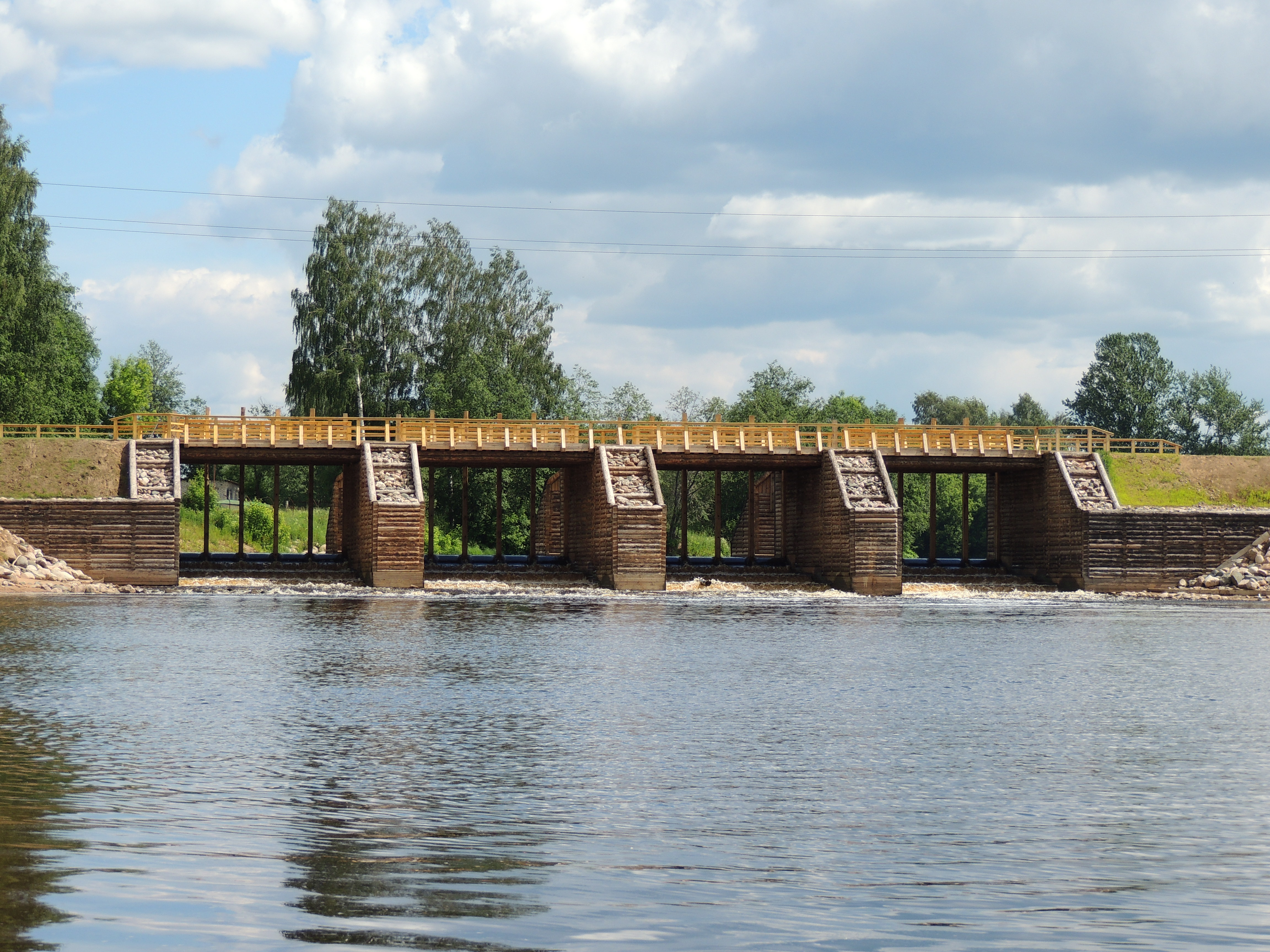
- The waterway's lock at Tikhvin
- Interactive map of Tikhvinskaya water system

Specifications
- Status: abandoned
- Navigation authority: State Water Register, 01040300322302000008594

History
- Date completed: 1802

Geography
- Start point: Rybinsk Reservoir
- End point: Lake Ladoga
- Beginning coordinates: 58°28′11″N 37°39′42″E
- Ending coordinates: 60°09′20″N 32°29′31″E

The Tihvinskaya water system (Russian: Тихвинская водная система) was one of the waterways connecting the Volga River with the Baltic Sea, and specifically the Mologa River with Syas River. In terms of the current administrative division of Russia, the waterway belongs to Vologda and Leningrad Oblasts.

It was first conceived by Peter the Great, but construction started only in 1802. The Tihvinskaya water system was built for the passage of middle-sized ships. This Tikhvin system functioned until the middle of the 20th century, when shipping along the Svir River and the construction of railways had increased competition which led to its closure.

== Geography ==
The Tihvinskaya water system started at the Rybinsk wharf on the river Volga. The waterway went along the Volga (32 km), then on Mologa River (175 km). From the Mologa the waterway turned aside at Chagodoshcha and extended 179 km along the rivers Chagodoshcha and Gorun. After 33 km, it followed the river Sominka (32 km), lake Somin, and the Volchyna river (10 km).

Between the upper Volchyna river and Lake Elgino the 6 km Tikhvin canal was built. Then the path ran on lake Elgino, the Tikhvinka River (159 km), and on the river Syas. Then the route goes through the Syas canal (10 km), and Ladoga Canal, and finally through the Neva River (58 km). The Tihvinskaya system ends at the pier near the Alexander Nevsky Lavra in St. Petersburg. The total length of the waterway was 902 km.

== History ==
In the 18th century, construction of the Tikhvinskaia water system was raised several times on the agenda, but each time it was delayed due to lack of money in the treasury. In the summer of 1797, because of the severe drought, ships could not pass through the Vyshny Volochyok Waterway. Again, the question arose about the construction of the Tikhvin system. On January 1, 1802 Alexander I approved a draft of the water system General Devolant that would have built 17 locks and 10 of the sluice, and the channel between the lakes and the Swan Krupin.

== Current state ==
Today, the Tihvinskaya water system has fallen into decline. All the gates are destroyed. The water level in Tikhvinka river fell more than 5 meters. Tikhvinka is heavily polluted with household waste. Numerous monuments of architecture, located on the banks of the Tikhvinka and its tributaries are in dilapidated condition.
