= Chagodoshcha =

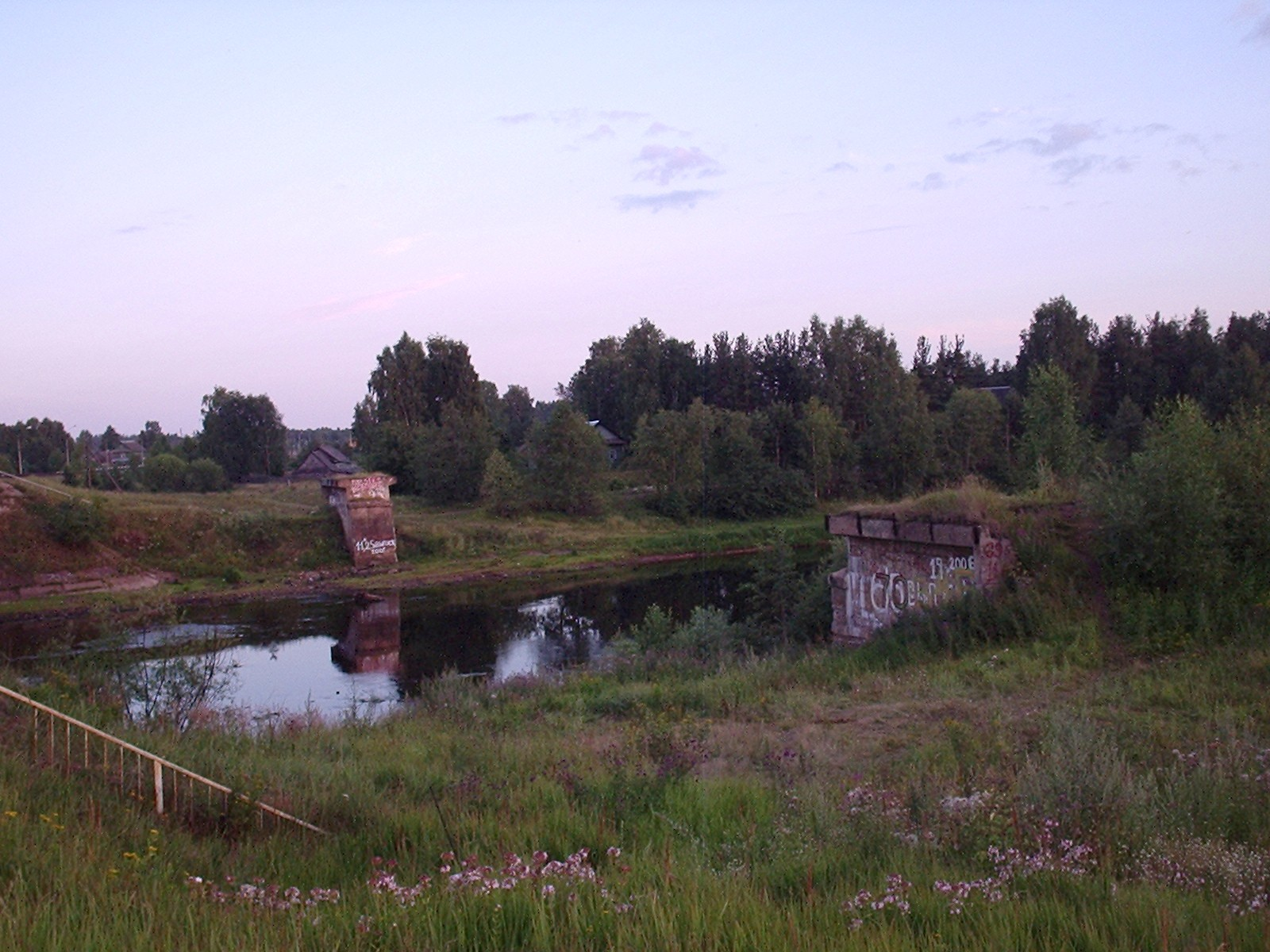
- A demolished bridge in the settlement of Chagoda

- Map of the Rybinsk Reservoir basin. The Chagodoshcha is shown on the map.
- Native name: Чагодоща (Russian)

Location
- Country: Russia

Physical characteristics
- Mouth: Mologa
  - coordinates: 58°57′36″N 36°35′21″E
  - elevation: 102 m (335 ft)
- Length: 242 km (150 mi)
- Basin size: 9,680 km^{2} (3,740 mi^{2})
- Discharge
  - average: 58 m^{3}/s (2,000 cu ft/s)

Basin features
- Progression: Mologa→ Volga→ Caspian Sea

The Chagodoshcha (Russian: Чагодоща, also known as Chagoda, Russian: Чагода) is a river in Boksitogorsky District of Leningrad Oblast and in Chagodoshchensky, Babayevsky, and Ustyuzhensky Districts of Vologda Oblast in Russia. It is a left tributary of the Mologa. It is 242 kilometres (150 mi) long, and the area of its basin is 9,680 square kilometres (3,740 sq mi). The principal tributaries are the Lid (left), the Pes (right), and the Vnina (left).

The source of the Chagodoshcha lies in the southeast of Leningrad Oblast, south of the town of Pikalyovo. The river flows in a general southeasterly direction and enters Vologda Oblast, where it accepts the Goryun from the left. In Vologda Oblast, the Chagodoshcha turns east and accepts the Lid from the left, and, just upstream from the settlement of Chagoda, the Pes from the right. The urban-type settlement of Chagoda is located on both banks of the Chagodoshcha. The river crosses Chagodoshchensky District from the west to the east, and subsequently runs at the border between Babayevsky (north) and Ustyuzhensky (south) Districts, turns northeast and enters Babayevsky District where it accepts the Vnina from the left. It then turns southeast and enters Ustyuzhensky District. The mouth of the Chagodoshcha is in the settlement of Imeni Zhelyabova.

The river basin of the Chagodoshcha comprises the eastern part of Boksitogorsky District of Leningrad Oblast, the northeastern part of Khvoyninsky District of Novgorod Oblast, as well as the whole area of Chagodoshchensky District, the south of Babayevsky District, and minor areas in Ustyuzhensky District, all of Vologda Oblast.

Both Chagodoshchensky District and its center, the urban-type settlement of Chagoda, are named after the river.

A big portion of the lower course of the Chagodoshcha, downstream of the mouth of the Goryun River, belongs to Tikhvinskaya water system, one of the waterways constructed in the early 19th century to connect the river basins of the Volga and the Neva. Currently, it is not used for any commercial navigation.
