= Boksitogorsky District =

Boksitogorsky District Бокситогорский район (Russian)
- District
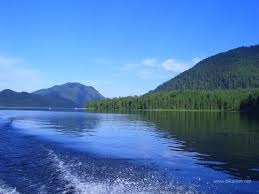
- Source of the Volozhba River, in Boksitogorsky District

- Flag Coat of arms
- Location of Boksitogorsky District in Leningrad Oblast
- Coordinates: 59°29′N 34°40′E
- Country: Russia
- Federal subject: Leningrad Oblast
- Established: July 25, 1952
- Administrative center: Boksitogorsk

Area
  - Total: 7,200 km^{2} (2,800 sq mi)

Population (2010 Census)
  - Total: 15,695
  - Density: 2.2/km^{2} (5.6/sq mi)
  - Urban: 23.0%
  - Rural: 77.0%

Administrative structure
  - Administrative divisions: 2 Settlement municipal formations (towns), 1 Settlement municipal formations (urban-type settlements), 7 Settlement municipal formations (rural settlements)
  - Inhabited localities: 2 cities/towns, 1 urban-type settlements, 258 rural localities

Municipal structure
  - Municipally incorporated as: Boksitogorsky Municipal District
  - Municipal divisions: 3 urban settlements, 7 rural settlements
- Time zone: UTC+3 (MSK)
- OKTMO ID: 41603000
- Website: http://www.boksitogorsk.ru/

Boksitogorsky District (Russian: Бокситого́рский райо́н) is an administrative and municipal district (raion), one of the seventeen in Leningrad Oblast, Russia. It is located in the southeast of the oblast and borders with Tikhvinsky District in the north and west, Babayevsky District of Vologda Oblast in the east, Chagodoshchensky District of Vologda Oblast in the southeast, Khvoyninsky District of Novgorod Oblast in the south, and with Lyubytinsky District of Novgorod Oblast in the southwest. The area of the district is 7,200 square kilometers (2,800 sq mi). Its administrative center is the town of Boksitogorsk. Population (excluding the administrative center): 15,695 (2010 census); 17,698 (2002 Census); 49,452 (1989 Soviet census).

== Geography ==
The district is located on the Tikhvin Ridge, a hilly area connecting with the Vepsian Upland, which separates the basins of the Baltic and Caspian Seas. The altitudes range from 150 to 250 meters (490 to 820 ft) above sea level. The western portion of the district is mostly flat with the altitudes between 50 and 100 meters (160 and 330 ft) above sea level. The district has deposits of bauxite, limestone, dolomite, and peat.

The western part of the district lies in the basin of the Syas River, a tributary of Lake Ladoga. The biggest tributaries of the Syas within the district are the Tikhvinka and the Volozhba. The northeastern part of the district belongs to the basin of the Pasha River, a tributary of the Svir, another major tributary of Lake Ladoga. The center and the southwest of the district lie in the basins of the Kolp River, a tributary of the Suda, and the Chagodoshcha, a tributary of the Mologa. Both the Kolp and the Chagodoshcha originate in the district and are a part of the Volga River's basin.

A considerable part of the district is covered with swamps. There are many lakes, especially in the east of the district.

The Ragusha River, a tributary of the Volozhba in the south of the district, in the basin of the Syas River, disappears underground for about 4 kilometers (2.5 mi) and then reappears. This area is protected as a natural monument.

== History ==
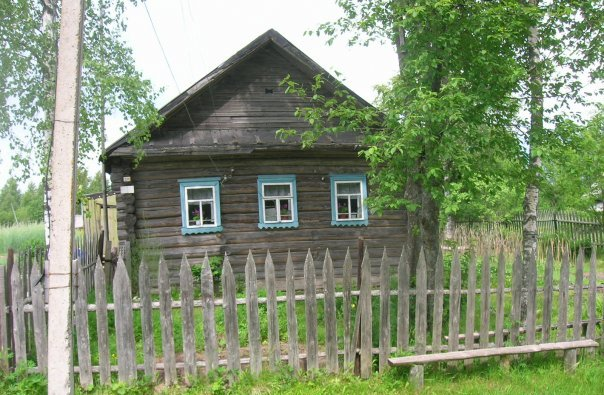
A wooden house in the village of Kosye Kharchevni

The area was populated by Balto-Finnic peoples, whose descendants, Vepsians, still live in the district. Until the 15th century, it was a part of the Novgorod Republic. In the 13th century, Antony Dymsky, a monk looking for a secluded area, founded a monastery, which is currently known as Antoniyevo-Dymsky Monastery. The territory was included into Obozerskaya Pyatina, one of the pyatinas which Novgorod lands were divided into. After the fall of the republic, the region was, together will all of the Novgorod lands, annexed by the Grand Duchy of Moscow.

In the course of the administrative reform carried out in 1708 by Peter the Great, the territory was included into Ingermanland Governorate (known since 1710 as Saint Petersburg Governorate). In 1727, separate Novgorod Governorate was split off. In 1776, the area was transferred to Novgorod Viceroyalty. In 1796, the viceroyalty was abolished, and the territory, which was split between Tikhvinsky and Ustyuzhensky Uyezds, was transferred to Novgorod Governorate. Until the end of the 19th century, the area was sparsely populated. In 1802, the Tikhvinskaya water system, which connected the basins of the Neva and the Volga, was opened. A railroad was built in the end of the 19th century. In 1916, bauxite deposits were discovered. In 1918, the area was transferred to newly established Cherepovets Governorate.

On August 1, 1927, the uyezds were abolished and the territory was split between Tikhvinsky, Yefimovsky, and Pikalyovsky Districts. The governorates were also abolished. Tikhvinsky and Pikalyovsky Districts were a part of Leningrad Okrug of Leningrad Oblast, whereas Yefimovsky District was a part of Cherepovets Okrug of Leningrad Oblast. On July 23, 1930, the okrugs were abolished as well, and the districts were directly subordinated to the oblast. In 1941, during World War II, German troops tried to encircle Leningrad. In November 1941, they occupied the town of Tikhvin and held it for a month. The current area of Boksitogorsky District was not occupied, but for several months it was immediately adjacent to the front line.

In 1950, Boksitogorsk was granted town status and on July 25, 1952, Boksitogorsky District with the administrative center in the town of Boksitogorsk was established. It included areas which previously belonged to Tikhvinsky and Yefimovsky Districts. In 1954, the urban-type settlement of Pikalyovo was granted town status. On February 1, 1963, in the course of Nikita Khrushchev's administrative reform, the district was abolished, and the town of Boksitogorsk was elevated in status to that of a town of oblast significance. On January 12, 1965, the district was re-established. In 1991, Pikalyovo was granted the status of a town of oblast significance.

On August 1, 1927, Yefimovsky District with the administrative center in the settlement of Yefimovsky was established as a part of Cherepovets Okrug of Leningrad Oblast. On February 1, 1963, the district was abolished, and, after a short period, merged into Boksitogorsky District.

On August 1, 1927, Pikalyovsky District with the administrative center in the selo of Pikalyovo was also established as a part of Leningrad Okrug of Leningrad Oblast. In 1932, Pikalyovsky District was abolished and split between Yefimovsky, Tikhvinsky, Dregelsky, Kapshinsky, and Khvoyninsky Districts. Dregelsky District is currently a part of Lyubytinsky District of Novgorod Oblast. The rest of the territory of former Pikalyovsky District is currently a part of Boksitogorsky District.

Another district established on August 1, 1927 as a part of Leningrad Okrug of Leningrad Oblast was Kapshinsky District, with the administrative center in the settlement of Shugozero. On February 1, 1963, the district was abolished and, after a short period, split between Boksitogorsky and Tikhvinsky Districts.

== Administrative and municipal divisions ==
As an administrative division, the district is divided into ten settlement municipal formations. As a municipal division, the district is incorporated as Boksitogorsky Municipal District and is divided into three urban and seven rural settlements.

== Economy ==
=== Industry ===
The economy of Boksitogorsky District is based on timber industry and food industry.

=== Agriculture ===
In the district, there are two mid-scale farms and four enterprises engaged in fish farming. The main agricultural specializations are cattle breeding and trout farming.

=== Transportation ===
A railroad connecting St. Petersburg and Vologda crosses the district from west to east. Yefimovsky and Podborovye are the principal stations within the district. A secondary line connects Podborovye with Chagoda and Kabozha, thus making a connection to the line between St. Petersburg and Sonkovo.

A114 highway, connecting Vologda to Cherepovets and St. Petersburg, crosses the district as well. A road branches off in Dymi and runs through Boksitogorsk to the settlement of Nebolchi in Novgorod Oblast. There are also local roads.

A considerable part of the Tikhvinskaya water system, one of the waterways constructed in the early 19th century to connect the basins of the Volga and Neva Rivers, lies in Boksitogorsky District. The waterway runs from the Syas upstream the Tikhvinka River. Lake Yelgino is connected by the Tikhvin Canal, 6 kilometers (3.7 mi) with the upper course of the Volchina River. The waterway then follows downstream the Gorun River, the Chagodoshcha River, and the Mologa River. Currently, it is not used for any commercial navigation.

== Culture and recreation ==
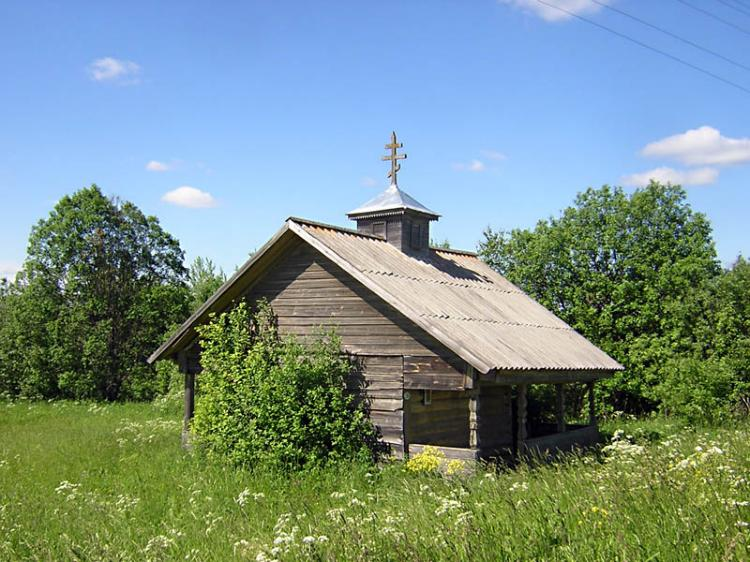
The assumption Chapel in the village of Zagolodno

The district contains nine cultural heritage monuments of federal significance as well as sixty-eight objects classified as cultural and historical heritage of local significance. Five of the federal monuments are related to the events connected with the times of the Great Patriotic War of 1941–1945. The other four are the wooden Church of Archangel Michael in the village of Nosovo, the wooden Church of the Nativity of the Theotokos in the village of Listvenka, the grave of a military engineer Viktor Krenke in the village of Kolbeki, and a monument commemorating the visits of Peter the Great between 1712 and 1716 in the urban-type settlement of Yefimovsky.

The only museum in the district is located in the village of Astrachi and highlights the events of 1941, when the German Army tried to encircle Leningrad and was stopped in this area.
