= Sazonovo =

Sazonovo (Russian: Сазоново) is the name of several inhabited localities in Russia.

== Urban localities ==
- Sazonovo, Chagodoshchensky District, Vologda Oblast, a work settlement in Chagodoshchensky District of Vologda Oblast

== Rural localities ==
- Sazonovo, Arkhangelsk Oblast, a village in Krechetovsky Selsoviet of Kargopolsky District of Arkhangelsk Oblast
- Sazonovo, Kaluga Oblast, a village in Medynsky District of Kaluga Oblast
- Sazonovo, Ryazanovsky, Yegoryevsky District, Moscow Oblast, a village under the administrative jurisdiction of the work settlement of Ryazanovsky in Yegoryevsky District of Moscow Oblast
- Sazonovo, Yegoryevsk, Yegoryevsky District, Moscow Oblast, a village under the administrative jurisdiction of the Town of Yegoryevsk in Yegoryevsky District of Moscow Oblast
- Sazonovo, Loknyansky District, Pskov Oblast, a village in Loknyansky District, Pskov Oblast
- Sazonovo, Novorzhevsky District, Pskov Oblast, a village in Novorzhevsky District, Pskov Oblast
- Sazonovo, Opochetsky District, Pskov Oblast, a village in Opochetsky District, Pskov Oblast
- Sazonovo, Ryazan Oblast, a village under the administrative jurisdiction of the work settlement of Starozhilovo in Starozhilovsky District of Ryazan Oblast
- Sazonovo, Saratov Oblast, a settlement in Atkarsky District of Saratov Oblast
- Sazonovo, Smolensk Oblast, a village in Stepanikovskoye Rural Settlement of Vyazemsky District of Smolensk Oblast
- Sazonovo, Oleninsky District, Tver Oblast, a village in Oleninsky District, Tver Oblast
- Sazonovo (Sharapovskoye Rural Settlement), Zapadnodvinsky District, Tver Oblast, a village in Zapadnodvinsky District, Tver Oblast; municipally, a part of Sharapovskoye Rural Settlement of that district
- Sazonovo (Zapadnodvinskoye Rural Settlement), Zapadnodvinsky District, Tver Oblast, a village in Zapadnodvinsky District, Tver Oblast; municipally, a part of Zapadnodvinskoye Rural Settlement of that district
- Sazonovo, Kirillovsky District, Vologda Oblast, a village in Volokoslavinsky Selsoviet of Kirillovsky District of Vologda Oblast
- Sazonovo, Vologodsky District, Vologda Oblast, a village in Bereznikovsky Selsoviet of Vologodsky District of Vologda Oblast
- Sazonovo, Yaroslavl Oblast, a village in Pomogalovsky Rural Okrug of Tutayevsky District of Yaroslavl Oblast
