= Anisimovo =

Anisimovo (Russian: Анисимово) is the name of several rural localities in Russia:

- Anisimovo, Altai Krai, a selo in Anisimovsky Selsoviet of Talmensky District of Altai Krai
- Anisimovo, Lezhnevsky District, Ivanovo Oblast, a village in Lezhnevsky District, Ivanovo Oblast
- Anisimovo, Pestyakovsky District, Ivanovo Oblast, a village in Pestyakovsky District, Ivanovo Oblast
- Anisimovo, Kaluga Oblast, a village in Maloyaroslavetsky District of Kaluga Oblast
- Anisimovo, Kemerovo Oblast, a selo in Krasulinskaya Rural Territory of Novokuznetsky District of Kemerovo Oblast
- Anisimovo, Kostroma Oblast, a village in Raslovskoye Settlement of Sudislavsky District of Kostroma Oblast
- Anisimovo, Leningrad Oblast, a village in Anisimovskoye Settlement Municipal Formation of Boksitogorsky District of Leningrad Oblast
- Anisimovo, Koverninsky District, Nizhny Novgorod Oblast, a village in Khokhlomsky Selsoviet of Koverninsky District of Nizhny Novgorod Oblast
- Anisimovo, Varnavinsky District, Nizhny Novgorod Oblast, a village in Mikhaleninsky Selsoviet of Varnavinsky District of Nizhny Novgorod Oblast
- Anisimovo, Novgorod Oblast, a village in Laptevskoye Settlement of Pestovsky District of Novgorod Oblast
- Anisimovo, Cherdynsky District, Perm Krai, a village in Cherdynsky District, Perm Krai
- Anisimovo, Ilyinsky District, Perm Krai, a village in Ilyinsky District, Perm Krai
- Anisimovo, Ostrovsky District, Pskov Oblast, a village in Ostrovsky District, Pskov Oblast
- Anisimovo, Pskovsky District, Pskov Oblast, a village in Pskovsky District, Pskov Oblast
- Anisimovo, Velikoluksky District, Pskov Oblast, a village in Velikoluksky District, Pskov Oblast
- Anisimovo, Bologovsky District, Tver Oblast, a village in Bologovsky District, Tver Oblast
- Anisimovo, Kalininsky District, Tver Oblast, a village in Kalininsky District, Tver Oblast
- Anisimovo, Krasnokholmsky District, Tver Oblast, a village in Krasnokholmsky District, Tver Oblast
- Anisimovo, Sonkovsky District, Tver Oblast, a village in Sonkovsky District, Tver Oblast
- Anisimovo, Udomelsky District, Tver Oblast, a village in Udomelsky District, Tver Oblast
- Anisimovo, Chagodoshchensky District, Vologda Oblast, a village in Pervomaysky Selsoviet of Chagodoshchensky District of Vologda Oblast
- Anisimovo, Gryazovetsky District, Vologda Oblast, a village in Sidorovsky Selsoviet of Gryazovetsky District of Vologda Oblast
- Anisimovo, Sheksninsky District, Vologda Oblast, a village in Yershovsky Selsoviet of Sheksninsky District of Vologda Oblast
- Anisimovo, Yaroslavl Oblast, a village in Klimovsky Rural Okrug of Nekrasovsky District of Yaroslavl Oblast
