= Zalozno =

Zalozno Залозно
- Village
- Location within Vologda Oblast Location within Russia
- Coordinates: 59°06′N 35°39′E
- Country: Russia
- Region: Vologda Oblast
- District: Chagodoshchensky District
- Time zone: UTC+3:00

Zalozno (Russian: Залозно) is a rural locality (a village) in Megrinskoye Rural Settlement, Chagodoshchensky District, Vologda Oblast, Russia. The population was 33 as of 2002.

== Geography ==
Zalozno is located 24 km (15 mi) southeast of Chagoda (the district's administrative centre) by road. Megrino is the nearest rural locality.
