= Kabozha =

Kabozha (Russian: Кабожа) is the name of several rural localities in Russia:

- Kabozha, Khvoyninsky District, Novgorod Oblast, a railway station in Kabozhskoye Settlement of Khvoyninsky District of Novgorod Oblast
- Kabozha, Moshenskoy District, Novgorod Oblast, a village in Kalininskoye Settlement of Moshenskoy District of Novgorod Oblast
- Kabozha, Vologda Oblast, a village in Belokrestsky Selsoviet of Chagodoshchensky District of Vologda Oblast
