= Lukinskoye =

Lukinskoye is the name of several rural localities in Russia:

- Lukinskoye, Vladimir Oblast
- Lukinskoye, Chagodoshchensky District, Vologda Oblast
- Lukinskoye, Cherepovetsky District, Vologda Oblast
