= Seredka =

Seredka (Russian: Середка) or Seryodka (Серёдка) is the name of several rural localities in Russia:

- Seredka, Lodeynopolsky District, Leningrad Oblast, a village in Alekhovshchinskoye Settlement Municipal Formation of Lodeynopolsky District of Leningrad Oblast
- Seredka, Tikhvinsky District, Leningrad Oblast, a village in Koskovskoye Settlement Municipal Formation of Tikhvinsky District of Leningrad Oblast
- Seredka, Novgorod Oblast, a village under the administrative jurisdiction of the urban-type settlement of Nebolchi, Lyubytinsky District, Novgorod Oblast
- Seryodka, Pskovsky District, Pskov Oblast, a selo in Pskovsky District, Pskov Oblast
- Seredka, Strugo-Krasnensky District, Pskov Oblast, a village in Strugo-Krasnensky District, Pskov Oblast
- Seredka, Tver Oblast, a village in Penovsky District of Tver Oblast
- Seredka, Vologda Oblast, a village in Megrinsky Selsoviet of Chagodoshchensky District of Vologda Oblast
- Seredka, Breytovsky District, Yaroslavl Oblast, a village in Filimonovsky Rural Okrug of Breytovsky District of Yaroslavl Oblast
- Seredka, Latskovsky Rural Okrug, Nekouzsky District, Yaroslavl Oblast, a village in Latskovsky Rural Okrug of Nekouzsky District of Yaroslavl Oblast
- Seredka, Rozhalovsky Rural Okrug, Nekouzsky District, Yaroslavl Oblast, a village in Rozhalovsky Rural Okrug of Nekouzsky District of Yaroslavl Oblast
