= Novinka, Chagodoshchensky District, Vologda Oblast =

Novinka Новинка
- Village
- Location within Vologda Oblast Location within Russia
- Coordinates: 59°08′N 35°00′E
- Country: Russia
- Region: Vologda Oblast
- District: Chagodoshchensky District
- Time zone: UTC+3:00

Novinka (Russian: Новинка) is a rural locality (a village) in Pervomayskoye Rural Settlement, Chagodoshchensky District, Vologda Oblast, Russia. The population was 10 as of 2002.

== Geography ==
Novinka is located 29 km (18 mi) west of Chagoda (the district's administrative centre) by road. Smerdomlya is the nearest rural locality.
