= Selishche, Chagodoshchensky District, Vologda Oblast =

Selishche Селище
- Village
- Location within Vologda Oblast Location within Russia
- Coordinates: 58°52′23″N 35°36′34″E
- Country: Russia
- Region: Vologda Oblast
- District: Chagodoshchensky District
- Time zone: UTC+3:00

Selishche (Russian: Селище) is a rural locality (a village) in Pokrovskoye Rural Settlement, Chagodoshchensky District, Vologda Oblast, Russia. The population was 2 as of 2002.

== Geography ==
Selishche is located 48 km (30 mi) southeast of Chagoda (the district's administrative centre) by road. Zhernovitsy is the nearest rural locality.
