= Usadishchi =

Usadishchi Усадищи
- Village
- Location within Vologda Oblast Location within Russia
- Coordinates: 58°51′N 35°12′E
- Country: Russia
- Region: Vologda Oblast
- District: Chagodoshchensky District
- Time zone: UTC+3:00

Usadishchi (Russian: Усадищи) is a rural locality (a village) in Lukinskoye Rural Settlement, Chagodoshchensky District, Vologda Oblast, Russia. The population was 3 as of 2002.

== Geography ==
Usadishchi is located 48 km (30 mi) south of Chagoda (the district's administrative centre) by road. Naumovskoye is the nearest rural locality.
