= Sirotovo =

Sirotovo Сиротово
- Village
- Location within Vologda Oblast Location within Russia
- Coordinates: 58°52′N 35°27′E
- Country: Russia
- Region: Vologda Oblast
- District: Chagodoshchensky District
- Time zone: UTC+3:00

Sirotovo (Russian: Сиротово) is a rural locality (a village) in Lukinskoye Rural Settlement, Chagodoshchensky District, Vologda Oblast, Russia. The population was 20 as of 2002.

== Geography ==
Sirotovo is located 51 km (32 mi) south of Chagoda (the district's administrative centre) by road. Olisovo is the nearest rural locality.
