= Semovo =

Semovo Семово
- Village
- Location within Vologda Oblast Location within Russia
- Coordinates: 58°58′N 35°18′E
- Country: Russia
- Region: Vologda Oblast
- District: Chagodoshchensky District
- Time zone: UTC+3:00

Semovo (Russian: Семово) is a rural locality (a village) in Izboishchskoye Rural Settlement, Chagodoshchensky District, Vologda Oblast, Russia. The population was 8 as of 2002.

== Geography ==
Semovo is located 34 km (21 mi) south of Chagoda (the district's administrative centre) by road. Trukhino is the nearest rural locality.
