= Valye =

Valye Вялье
- Village
- Location within Vologda Oblast Location within Russia
- Coordinates: 59°09′N 35°10′E
- Country: Russia
- Region: Vologda Oblast
- District: Chagodoshchensky District
- Time zone: UTC+3:00

Valye (Russian: Вялье) is a rural locality (a village) in Pervomayskoye Rural Settlement, Chagodoshchensky District, Vologda Oblast, Russia. The population was 5 as of 2002.

== Geography ==
Valye is located 19 km (12 mi) west of Chagoda (the district's administrative centre) by road. Pervomaysky is the nearest rural locality.
