= Grigoryevo, Chagodoshchensky District, Vologda Oblast =

Grigoryevo Григорьево
- Village
- Location within Vologda Oblast Location within Russia
- Coordinates: 58°53′N 35°17′E
- Country: Russia
- Region: Vologda Oblast
- District: Chagodoshchensky District
- Time zone: UTC+3:00

Grigoryevo (Russian: Григорьево) is a rural locality (a village) in Lukinskoye Rural Settlement, Chagodoshchensky District, Vologda Oblast, Russia. The population was 5 as of 2002.

== Geography ==
Grigoryevo is located 40 km (25 mi) south of Chagoda (the district's administrative centre) by road. Anishino is the nearest rural locality.
