= Lvov Dvor =

Lvov Dvor Львов Двор
- Village
- Location within Vologda Oblast Location within Russia
- Coordinates: 59°13′N 35°40′E
- Country: Russia
- Region: Vologda Oblast
- District: Chagodoshchensky District
- Time zone: UTC+3:00

Lvov Dvor (Russian: Львов Двор) is a rural locality (a village) in Megrinskoye Rural Settlement, Chagodoshchensky District, Vologda Oblast, Russia. The population was 6 as of 2002.

== Geography ==
Lvov Dvor is located 26 km (16 mi) northeast of Chagoda (the district's administrative centre) by road. Seredka is the nearest rural locality.
