= Belye Kresty =

Belye Kresty Белые Кресты
- Selo
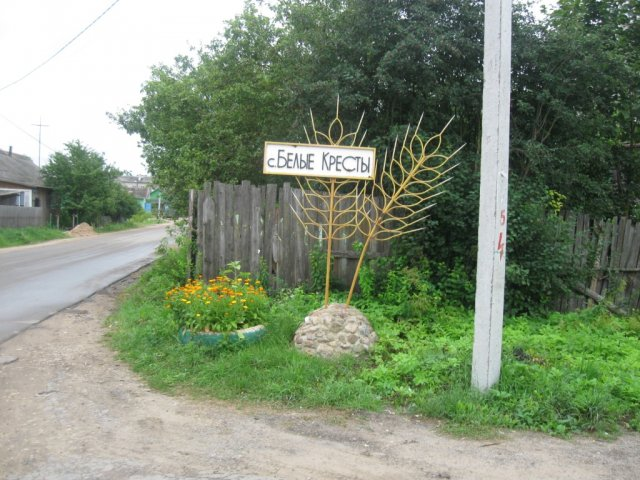

- Location within Vologda Oblast Location within Russia
- Coordinates: 59°05′N 35°20′E
- Country: Russia
- Region: Vologda Oblast
- District: Chagodoshchensky District
- Time zone: UTC+3:00

Belye Kresty (Russian: Белые Кресты) is a rural locality (a selo) and the administrative center of Belokrestskoye Rural Settlement, Chagodoshchensky District, Vologda Oblast, Russia. The population was 430 as of 2002. There are 9 streets.

== Geography ==
Belye Kresty is located 15 km (9.3 mi) southwest of Chagoda (the district's administrative centre) by road. Sazonovo is the nearest rural locality.
