= Sholokhovo, Chagodoshchensky District, Vologda Oblast =

Sholokhovo Шолохово
- Village
- Location within Vologda Oblast Location within Russia
- Coordinates: 58°59′N 35°17′E
- Country: Russia
- Region: Vologda Oblast
- District: Chagodoshchensky District
- Time zone: UTC+3:00

Sholokhovo (Russian: Шолохово) is a rural locality (a village) in Izboishchskoye Rural Settlement, Chagodoshchensky District, Vologda Oblast, Russia. The population was 4 as of 2002.

== Geography ==
Sholokhovo is located 29 km (18 mi) south of Chagoda (the district's administrative centre) by road. Izboishchi is the nearest rural locality.
