= Fishovo =

Fishovo Фишово
- Village
- Location within Vologda Oblast Location within Russia
- Coordinates: 58°57′N 35°32′E
- Country: Russia
- Region: Vologda Oblast
- District: Chagodoshchensky District
- Time zone: UTC+3:00

Fishovo (Russian: Фишово) is a rural locality (a village) in Pokrovskoye Rural Settlement, Chagodoshchensky District, Vologda Oblast, Russia. The population was 24 as of 2002.

== Geography ==
Fishovo is located 35 km (22 mi) southeast of Chagoda (the district's administrative centre) by road. Zubovo is the nearest rural locality.
