= Smerdomsky =

Smerdomsky Смердомский
- Settlement
- Location within Vologda Oblast Location within Russia
- Coordinates: 59°10′N 35°03′E
- Country: Russia
- Region: Vologda Oblast
- District: Chagodoshchensky District
- Time zone: UTC+3:00

Smerdomsky (Russian: Смердомский) is a rural locality (a settlement) in Pervomayskoye Rural Settlement, Chagodoshchensky District, Vologda Oblast, Russia. The population was 751 as of 2002. There are 11 streets.

== Geography ==
Smerdomsky is located 25 km (16 mi) northwest of Chagoda (the district's administrative centre) by road. Pervomaysky is the nearest rural locality.
