= Podlipye =

Podlipye Подлипье
- Village
- Location within Vologda Oblast Location within Russia
- Coordinates: 58°49′N 35°14′E
- Country: Russia
- Region: Vologda Oblast
- District: Chagodoshchensky District
- Time zone: UTC+3:00

Podlipye (Russian: Подлипье) is a rural locality (a village) in Lukinskoye Rural Settlement, Chagodoshchensky District, Vologda Oblast, Russia. The population was 2 as of 2002.

== Geography ==
Podlipye is located 50 km (31 mi) south of Chagoda (the district's administrative centre) by road. Baslovo is the nearest rural locality.
