= Leshutino =

Leshutino Лешутино
- Village
- Location within Vologda Oblast Location within Russia
- Coordinates: 59°06′N 35°09′E
- Country: Russia
- Region: Vologda Oblast
- District: Chagodoshchensky District
- Time zone: UTC+3:00

Leshutino (Russian: Лешутино) is a rural locality (a village) in Belokrestskoye Rural Settlement, Chagodoshchensky District, Vologda Oblast, Russia. The population was 21 as of 2002.

== Geography ==
Leshutino is located 18 km (11 mi) southwest of Chagoda (the district's administrative centre) by road. Zaluzhye is the nearest rural locality.
