= Kochubino =

Kochubino Кочубино
- Village
- Location within Vologda Oblast Location within Russia
- Coordinates: 59°08′N 35°33′E
- Country: Russia
- Region: Vologda Oblast
- District: Chagodoshchensky District
- Time zone: UTC+3:00

Kochubino (Russian: Кочубино) is a rural locality (a village) in Megrinskoye Rural Settlement, Chagodoshchensky District, Vologda Oblast, Russia. The population was 20 as of 2002.

== Geography ==
Kochubino is located 14 km (8.7 mi) east of Chagoda (the district's administrative centre) by road. Megrino is the nearest rural locality.
