= Pustyn, Chagodoshchensky District, Vologda Oblast =

Pustyn Пустынь
- Village
- Location within Vologda Oblast Location within Russia
- Coordinates: 59°02′N 35°48′E
- Country: Russia
- Region: Vologda Oblast
- District: Chagodoshchensky District
- Time zone: UTC+3:00

Pustyn (Russian: Пустынь) is a rural locality (a village) in Megrinskoye Rural Settlement, Chagodoshchensky District, Vologda Oblast, Russia. The population was 10 as of 2002.

== Geography ==
Pustyn is located 38 km (24 mi) southeast of Chagoda (the district's administrative centre) by road. Zalozno is the nearest rural locality.
