= Anishino =

Anishino Анишино
- Village
- Location within Vologda Oblast Location within Russia
- Coordinates: 58°53′N 35°19′E
- Country: Russia
- Region: Vologda Oblast
- District: Chagodoshchensky District
- Time zone: UTC+3:00

Anishino (Russian: Анишино) is a rural locality (a village) and the administrative center of Lukinskoye Rural Settlement, Chagodoshchensky District, Vologda Oblast, Russia. The population was 321 as of 2002. There are 4 streets.

== Geography ==
Anishino is located 41 km (25 mi) south of Chagoda (the district's administrative centre) by road. Krasnaya Gorka is the nearest rural locality.
