= Pervomaysky, Chagodoshchensky District, Vologda Oblast =

Pervomaysky Первомайский
- Settlement
- Location within Vologda Oblast Location within Russia
- Coordinates: 59°10′N 35°07′E
- Country: Russia
- Region: Vologda Oblast
- District: Chagodoshchensky District
- Time zone: UTC+3:00

Pervomaysky (Russian: Первомайский) is a rural locality (a settlement) in Pervomayskoye Rural Settlement, Chagodoshchensky District, Vologda Oblast, Russia. The population was 256 as of 2002. There are 3 streets.

== Geography ==
Pervomaysky is located 23 km (14 mi) northwest of Chagoda (the district's administrative centre) by road. Oksyukovo is the nearest rural locality.
