= Pes (river) =

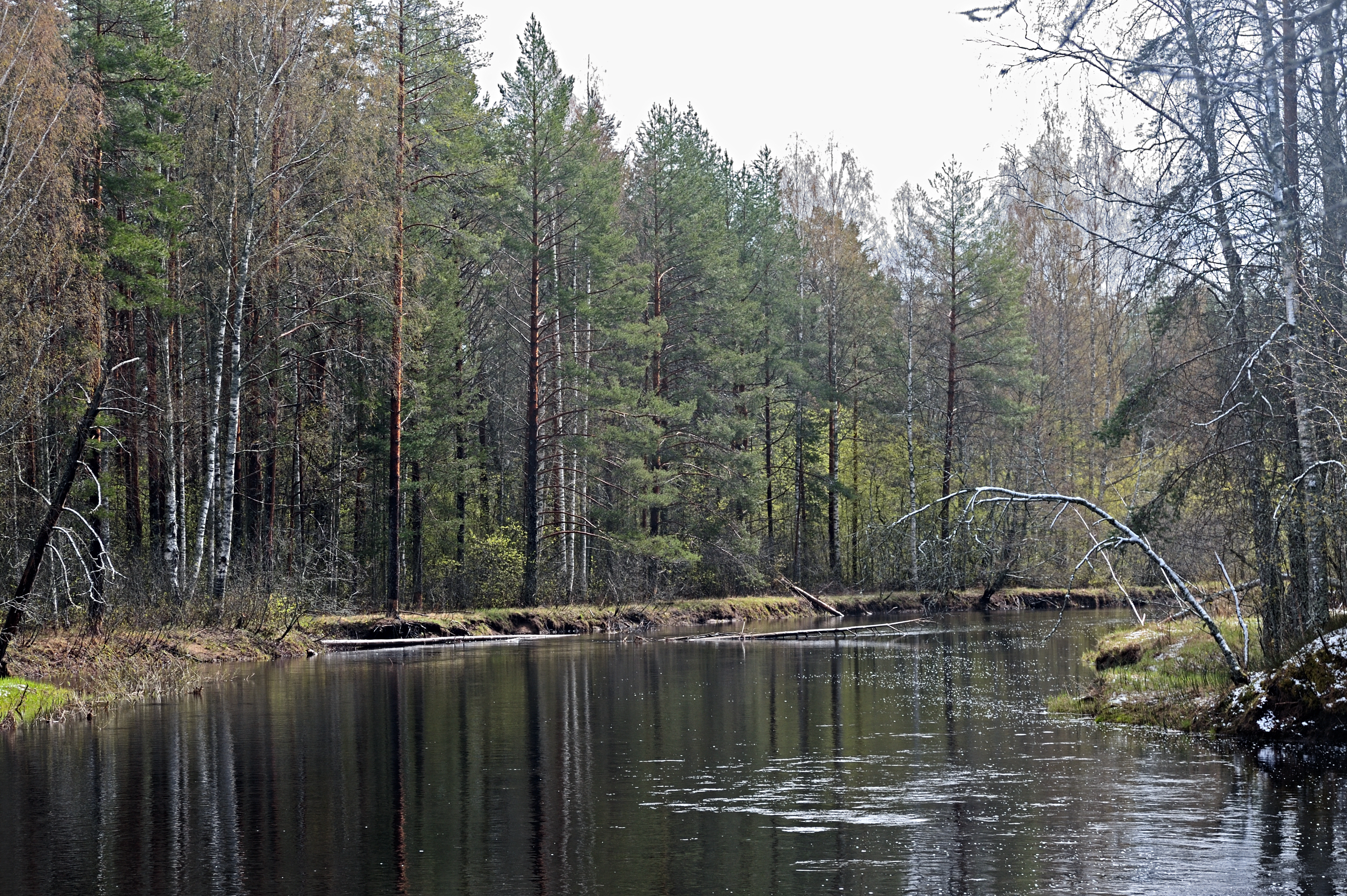

- Map of the Rybinsk Reservoir basin. The Pes is shown on the map.
- Native name: Песь (Russian)

Location
- Country: Russia

Physical characteristics
- Source
  - location: Lake Rakitinskoye
- Mouth: Chagodoshcha
  - coordinates: 59°08′58″N 35°16′54″E
- Length: 145 km (90 mi)
- Basin size: 2,730 km^{2} (1,050 mi^{2})
- Discharge
  - average: 6.4 m^{3}/s (230 cu ft/s)

Basin features
- Progression: Chagodoshcha→ Mologa→ Volga→ Caspian Sea

The Pes (Russian: Песь) is a river in Khvoyninsky District of Novgorod Oblast and in Chagodoshchensky District of Vologda Oblast in Russia. It is a right tributary of the Chagodoshcha. It is 145 kilometres (90 mi) long, and the area of its basin is 2,730 square kilometres (1,050 sq mi). The principal tributary of the Pes is the Rattsa (left). The urban-type settlements of Khvoynaya and Sazonovo are located on the banks of the Pes.

The source of the Pes is Lake Rakitinskoye in the west of Khvoyninsky District. The Medveda is the principal tributary of Lake Rakitinskoye. The Pes flows in an easterly direction, passes through the settlement of Khvoynaya, accepts the Kushavera from the right, enters Vologda Oblast, and turns northeast. In the settlement of Sazonovo, it accepts the Rattsa from the left. The mouth of the Pes is near the urban-type settlement of Chagoda.

The Pes river basin comprises the major part (western and central) of Khvoyninsky District, some areas in the east of Lyubytinsky District of Novgorod Oblast, and the southwest of Chagodoshchensky district. In particular, it includes many lakes located in the southwest of Khvoyninsky District.

Until the 1990s, the Pes was used for timber rafting.
