= Kostyleva Gora =

Kostyleva Gora Костылева Гора
- Village
- Location within Vologda Oblast Location within Russia
- Coordinates: 59°02′N 35°21′E
- Country: Russia
- Region: Vologda Oblast
- District: Chagodoshchensky District
- Time zone: UTC+3:00

Kostyleva Gora (Russian: Костылева Гора) is a rural locality (a village) in Belokrestskoye Rural Settlement, Chagodoshchensky District, Vologda Oblast, Russia. The population was 4 as of 2002.

== Geography ==
Kostyleva Gora is located 22 km (14 mi) south of Chagoda (the district's administrative centre) by road. Trukhnovo is the nearest rural locality.
