= Chikusovo =

Chikusovo Чикусово
- Village
- Location within Vologda Oblast Location within Russia
- Coordinates: 58°51′N 35°21′E
- Country: Russia
- Region: Vologda Oblast
- District: Chagodoshchensky District
- Time zone: UTC+3:00

Chikusovo (Russian: Чикусово) is a rural locality (a village) in Lukinskoye Rural Settlement, Chagodoshchensky District, Vologda Oblast, Russia. The population was 19 as of 2002.

== Geography ==
Chikusovo is located 45 km (28 mi) south of Chagoda (the district's administrative centre) by road. Lukinskoye is the nearest rural locality.
