= Berezye =

Berezye Березье
- Village
- Location within Vologda Oblast Location within Russia
- Coordinates: 59°04′N 35°16′E
- Country: Russia
- Region: Vologda Oblast
- District: Chagodoshchensky District
- Time zone: UTC+3:00

Berezye (Russian: Березье) is a rural locality (a village) in Belokrestskoye Rural Settlement, Chagodoshchensky District, Vologda Oblast, Russia. The population was 6 as of 2002.

== Geography ==
Berezye is located 15 km (9.3 mi) southwest of Chagoda (the district's administrative centre) by road. Paport is the nearest rural locality.
