= Chagoda, Vologda Oblast =

Chagoda Чагода
- Village
- Location within Vologda Oblast Location within Russia
- Coordinates: 59°08′N 35°17′E
- Country: Russia
- Region: Vologda Oblast
- District: Chagodoshchensky District
- Time zone: UTC+3:00

Chagoda (Russian: Чагода) is a rural locality (a village) in Belokrestskoye Rural Settlement, Chagodoshchensky District, Vologda Oblast, Russia. The population was 14 as of 2002.

== Geography ==
Chagoda is located 7 km (4.3 mi) southwest of Chagoda (the district's administrative centre) by road. Panik is the nearest rural locality.
