= Zhernovitsy =

Zhernovitsy Жерновицы
- Village
- Location within Vologda Oblast Location within Russia
- Coordinates: 58°52′N 35°35′E
- Country: Russia
- Region: Vologda Oblast
- District: Chagodoshchensky District
- Time zone: UTC+3:00

Zhernovitsy (Russian: Жерновицы) is a rural locality (a village) in Pokrovskoye Rural Settlement, Chagodoshchensky District, Vologda Oblast, Russia. The population was 1 as of 2002.

== Geography ==
Zhernovitsy is located 49 km (30 mi) southeast of Chagoda (the district's administrative centre) by road. Selishche is the nearest rural locality.
