= Zagorye, Chagodoshchensky District, Vologda Oblast =

Zagorye Загорье
- Village
- Location within Vologda Oblast Location within Russia
- Coordinates: 59°02′N 35°15′E
- Country: Russia
- Region: Vologda Oblast
- District: Chagodoshchensky District
- Time zone: UTC+3:00

Zagorye (Russian: Загорье) is a rural locality (a village) in Belokrestskoye Rural Settlement, Chagodoshchensky District, Vologda Oblast, Russia. The population was 10 as of 2002.

== Geography ==
Zagorye is located 21 km (13 mi) southwest of Chagoda (the district's administrative centre) by road. Zapolye is the nearest rural locality.
