= Bortnikovo =

Bortnikovo Бортниково
- Village
- Location within Vologda Oblast Location within Russia
- Coordinates: 59°01′N 35°08′E
- Country: Russia
- Region: Vologda Oblast
- District: Chagodoshchensky District
- Time zone: UTC+3:00

Bortnikovo (Russian: Бортниково) is a rural locality (a village) in Belokrestskoye Rural Settlement, Chagodoshchensky District, Vologda Oblast, Russia. The population was 45 as of 2002.

== Geography ==
Bortnikovo is located 25 km (16 mi) southwest of Chagoda (the district's administrative centre) by road. Belye Kresty is the nearest rural locality.
