= Naumovskoye, Chagodoshchensky District, Vologda Oblast =

Naumovskoye Наумовское
- Village
- Location within Vologda Oblast Location within Russia
- Coordinates: 58°50′N 35°13′E
- Country: Russia
- Region: Vologda Oblast
- District: Chagodoshchensky District
- Time zone: UTC+3:00

Naumovskoye (Russian: Наумовское) is a rural locality (a village) in Lukinskoye Rural Settlement, Chagodoshchensky District, Vologda Oblast, Russia. The population was 9 as of 2002.

== Geography ==
Naumovskoye is located 47 km (29 mi) south of Chagoda (the district's administrative centre) by road. Belskoye is the nearest rural locality.
