= Zaruchevye, Chagodoshchensky District, Vologda Oblast =

Zaruchevye Заручевье
- Village
- Location within Vologda Oblast Location within Russia
- Coordinates: 59°08′N 34°59′E
- Country: Russia
- Region: Vologda Oblast
- District: Chagodoshchensky District
- Time zone: UTC+3:00

Zaruchevye (Russian: Заручевье) is a rural locality (a village) in Pervomayskoye Rural Settlement, Chagodoshchensky District, Vologda Oblast, Russia. The population was 6 as of 2002.

== Geography ==
Zaruchevye is located 31 km (19 mi) west of Chagoda (the district's administrative centre) by road. Ignashino is the nearest rural locality.
