= Oksyukovo =

Oksyukovo Оксюково
- Village
- Location within Vologda Oblast Location within Russia
- Coordinates: 59°11′N 35°06′E
- Country: Russia
- Region: Vologda Oblast
- District: Chagodoshchensky District
- Time zone: UTC+3:00

Oksyukovo (Russian: Оксюково) is a rural locality (a village) in Pervomayskoye Rural Settlement, Chagodoshchensky District, Vologda Oblast, Russia. The population was 22 as of 2002.

== Geography ==
Oksyukovo is located 24 km (15 mi) northwest of Chagoda (the district's administrative centre) by road. Pervomaysky is the nearest rural locality.
