= Metelishchi =

Metelishchi Метелищи
- Village
- Location within Vologda Oblast Location within Russia
- Coordinates: 59°02′N 35°14′E
- Country: Russia
- Region: Vologda Oblast
- District: Chagodoshchensky District
- Time zone: UTC+3:00

Metelishchi (Russian: Метелищи) is a rural locality (a village) in Belokrestskoye Rural Settlement, Chagodoshchensky District, Vologda Oblast, Russia. The population was 9 as of 2002.

== Geography ==
Metelishchi is located 19 km (12 mi) southwest of Chagoda (the district's administrative centre) by road. Zapolye is the nearest rural locality.
