= Grechnevo =

Grechnevo Гречнево
- Village
- Location within Vologda Oblast Location within Russia
- Coordinates: 58°52′N 35°35′E
- Country: Russia
- Region: Vologda Oblast
- District: Chagodoshchensky District
- Time zone: UTC+3:00

Grechnevo (Russian: Гречнево) is a rural locality (a village) in Pokrovskoye Rural Settlement, Chagodoshchensky District, Vologda Oblast, Russia. The population was 1 as of 2002.

== Geography ==
Grechnevo is located 47 km (29 mi) southeast of Chagoda, the district's administrative centre, by road. Selishche is the nearest rural locality.
