= Kolobovo, Vologda Oblast =

Kolobovo Колобово
- Village
- Location within Vologda Oblast Location within Russia
- Coordinates: 59°03′N 35°20′E
- Country: Russia
- Region: Vologda Oblast
- District: Chagodoshchensky District
- Time zone: UTC+3:00

Kolobovo (Russian: Колобово) is a rural locality (a village) in Belokrestskoye Rural Settlement, Chagodoshchensky District, Vologda Oblast, Russia. The population was 19 as of 2002.

== Geography ==
Kolobovo is located 19 km (12 mi) south of Chagoda (the district's administrative centre) by road. Baranovo is the nearest rural locality.
