= Gora, Chagodoshchensky District, Vologda Oblast =

Gora Гора
- Village
- Location within Vologda Oblast Location within Russia
- Coordinates: 59°02′N 35°21′E
- Country: Russia
- Region: Vologda Oblast
- District: Chagodoshchensky District
- Time zone: UTC+3:00

Gora (Russian: Гора) is a rural locality (a village) in Pokrovskoye Rural Settlement, Chagodoshchensky District, Vologda Oblast, Russia. The population was 23 as of 2002.

== Geography ==
Gora is located 41 km (25 mi) southeast of Chagoda (the district's administrative centre) by road. Remenevo is the nearest rural locality.
