= Kharchikha =

Kharchikha Харчиха
- Village
- Location within Vologda Oblast Location within Russia
- Coordinates: 59°00′N 35°14′E
- Country: Russia
- Region: Vologda Oblast
- District: Chagodoshchensky District
- Time zone: UTC+3:00

Kharchikha (Russian: Харчиха) is a rural locality (a village) in Izboishchskoye Rural Settlement, Chagodoshchensky District, Vologda Oblast, Russia. The population was 8 as of 2002.

== Geography ==
Kharchikha is located 24 km (15 mi) southwest of Chagoda (the district's administrative centre) by road. Klypino is the nearest rural locality.
