= Olisovo =

Olisovo Олисово
- Village
- Location within Vologda Oblast Location within Russia
- Coordinates: 58°53′N 35°27′E
- Country: Russia
- Region: Vologda Oblast
- District: Chagodoshchensky District
- Time zone: UTC+3:00

Olisovo (Russian: Олисово) is a rural locality (a village) in Lukinskoye Rural Settlement, Chagodoshchensky District, Vologda Oblast, Russia. The population was 14 as of 2002.

== Geography ==
Olisovo is located 51 km (32 mi) south of Chagoda (the district's administrative centre) by road. Sirotovo is the nearest rural locality.
