= Puchnino =

Puchnino Пучнино
- Village
- Location within Vologda Oblast Location within Russia
- Coordinates: 59°09′N 34°53′E
- Country: Russia
- Region: Vologda Oblast
- District: Chagodoshchensky District
- Time zone: UTC+3:00

Puchnino (Russian: Пучнино) is a rural locality (a village) in Pervomayskoye Rural Settlement, Chagodoshchensky District, Vologda Oblast, Russia. The population was 7 as of 2002.

== Geography ==
Puchnino is located 35 km (22 mi) west of Chagoda (the district's administrative centre) by road. Novaya is the nearest rural locality.
