= Yerokhovo =

Yerokhovo Ерохово
- Village
- Location within Vologda Oblast Location within Russia
- Coordinates: 59°04′N 35°14′E
- Country: Russia
- Region: Vologda Oblast
- District: Chagodoshchensky District
- Time zone: UTC+3:00

Yerokhovo (Russian: Ерохово) is a rural locality (a village) in Belokrestskoye Rural Settlement, Chagodoshchensky District, Vologda Oblast, Russia. The population was 44 as of 2002.

== Geography ==
Yerokhovo is located 10 km (6.2 mi) southwest of Chagoda (the district's administrative centre) by road. Belye Kresty is the nearest rural locality.
