= Izboishchi =

Izboishchi Избоищи
- Village
- Location within Vologda Oblast Location within Russia
- Coordinates: 58°59′N 35°17′E
- Country: Russia
- Region: Vologda Oblast
- District: Chagodoshchensky District
- Time zone: UTC+3:00

Izboishchi (Russian: Избоищи) is a rural locality (a village) and the administrative center of Izboishchskoye Rural Settlement, Chagodoshchensky District, Vologda Oblast, Russia. The population was 263 as of 2002. There are 5 streets.

== Geography ==
Izboishchi is located 29 km (18 mi) south of Chagoda (the district's administrative centre) by road. Trukhino is the nearest rural locality.
