= Megrino =

Megrino Мегрино
- Village
- Location within Vologda Oblast Location within Russia
- Coordinates: 59°08′N 35°35′E
- Country: Russia
- Region: Vologda Oblast
- District: Chagodoshchensky District
- Time zone: UTC+3:00

Megrino (Russian: Мегрино) is a rural locality (a village) and the administrative center of Megrinskoye Rural Settlement, Chagodoshchensky District, Vologda Oblast, Russia. The population was 233 as of 2002. There are 3 streets.

== Geography ==
Megrino is located 15 km (9.3 mi) southeast of Chagoda (the district's administrative centre) by road. Gorka is the nearest rural locality.
