= Kabozha, Vologda Oblast =

Kabozha Кабожа
- Village
- Location within Vologda Oblast Location within Russia
- Coordinates: 59°01′N 35°25′E
- Country: Russia
- Region: Vologda Oblast
- District: Chagodoshchensky District
- Time zone: UTC+3:00

Kabozha (Russian: Кабожа) is a rural locality (a village) in Belokrestskoye Rural Settlement, Chagodoshchensky District, Vologda Oblast, Russia. The population was 8 as of 2002.

== Geography ==
Kabozha is located 26 km (16 mi) southeast of Chagoda (the district's administrative centre) by road. Trukhnovo is the nearest rural locality.
