= Borisovo, Chagodoshchensky District, Vologda Oblast =

Borisovo Борисово
- Settlement
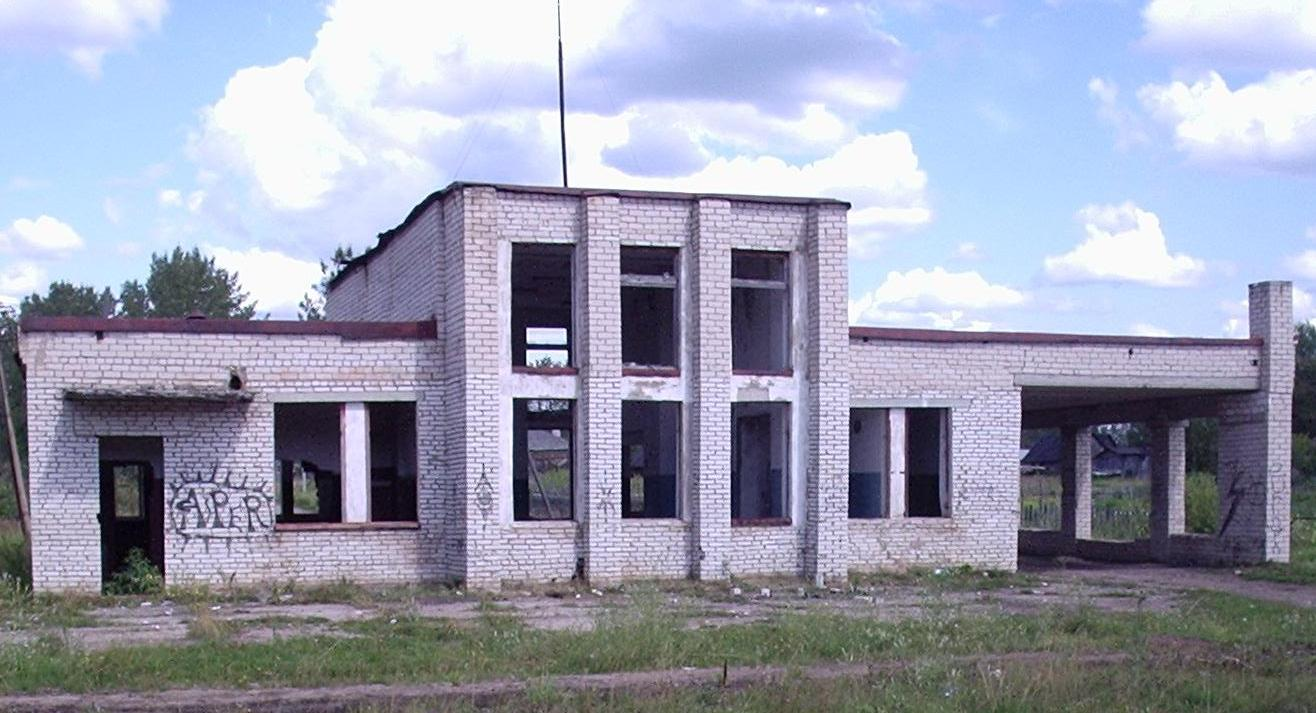
- Borisovo, Chagoschensky District, Vologda Oblast; Railway station

- Location within Vologda Oblast Location within Russia
- Coordinates: 59°06′N 35°22′E
- Country: Russia
- Region: Vologda Oblast
- District: Chagodoshchensky District
- Time zone: UTC+3:00

Borisovo (Russian: Борисово) is a rural locality (a settlement) and the administrative center of Borisovskoye Rural Settlement, Chagodoshchensky District, Vologda Oblast, Russia. The population was 515 as of 2002. There are 6 streets.

== Geography ==
Borisovo is located 9 km (5.6 mi) south of Chagoda (the district's administrative centre) by road. Malashkino is the nearest rural locality.
