= Lukinskoye, Chagodoshchensky District, Vologda Oblast =

Lukinskoye Лукинское
- Village
- Location within Vologda Oblast Location within Russia
- Coordinates: 58°52′N 35°20′E
- Country: Russia
- Region: Vologda Oblast
- District: Chagodoshchensky District
- Time zone: UTC+3:00

Lukinskoye (Russian: Лукинское) is a rural locality (village) in Lukinskoye Rural Settlement, Chagodoshchensky District, Vologda Oblast, Russia. The population was 41 as of 2002.

== Geography ==
Lukinskoye is located 43 km (27 mi) south of Chagoda (the district's administrative centre) by road. Krasnaya Gorka is the nearest rural locality.
