= Trukhino =

Trukhino Трухино
- Village
- Location within Vologda Oblast Location within Russia
- Coordinates: 58°58′N 35°16′E
- Country: Russia
- Region: Vologda Oblast
- District: Chagodoshchensky District

Population (2002)
  - Total: 56
- Time zone: UTC+3:00

Trukhino (Russian: Трухино) is a rural locality (a village) in Izboishchskoye Rural Settlement, Chagodoshchensky District, Vologda Oblast, Russia. The population was 56 as of 2002.

== Geography ==
Trukhino is located 30 km (19 mi) south of Chagoda (the district's administrative centre) by road. Semovo is the nearest rural locality.
