= Seredka, Vologda Oblast =

Seredka Середка
- Village
- Location within Vologda Oblast Location within Russia
- Coordinates: 59°13′N 35°39′E
- Country: Russia
- Region: Vologda Oblast
- District: Chagodoshchensky District
- Time zone: UTC+3:00

Seredka (Russian: Середка) is a rural locality (a village) in Megrinskoye Rural Settlement, Chagodoshchensky District, Vologda Oblast, Russia. The population was 19 as of 2002.

== Geography ==
Seredka is located km northeast of Chagoda (the district's administrative centre) by road. Lvov Dvor is the nearest rural locality.
