= Khvoyninsky District =

Khvoyninsky District Хвойнинский район (Russian)
- District
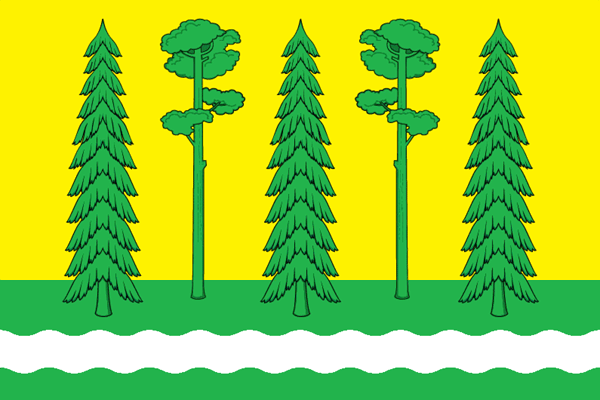
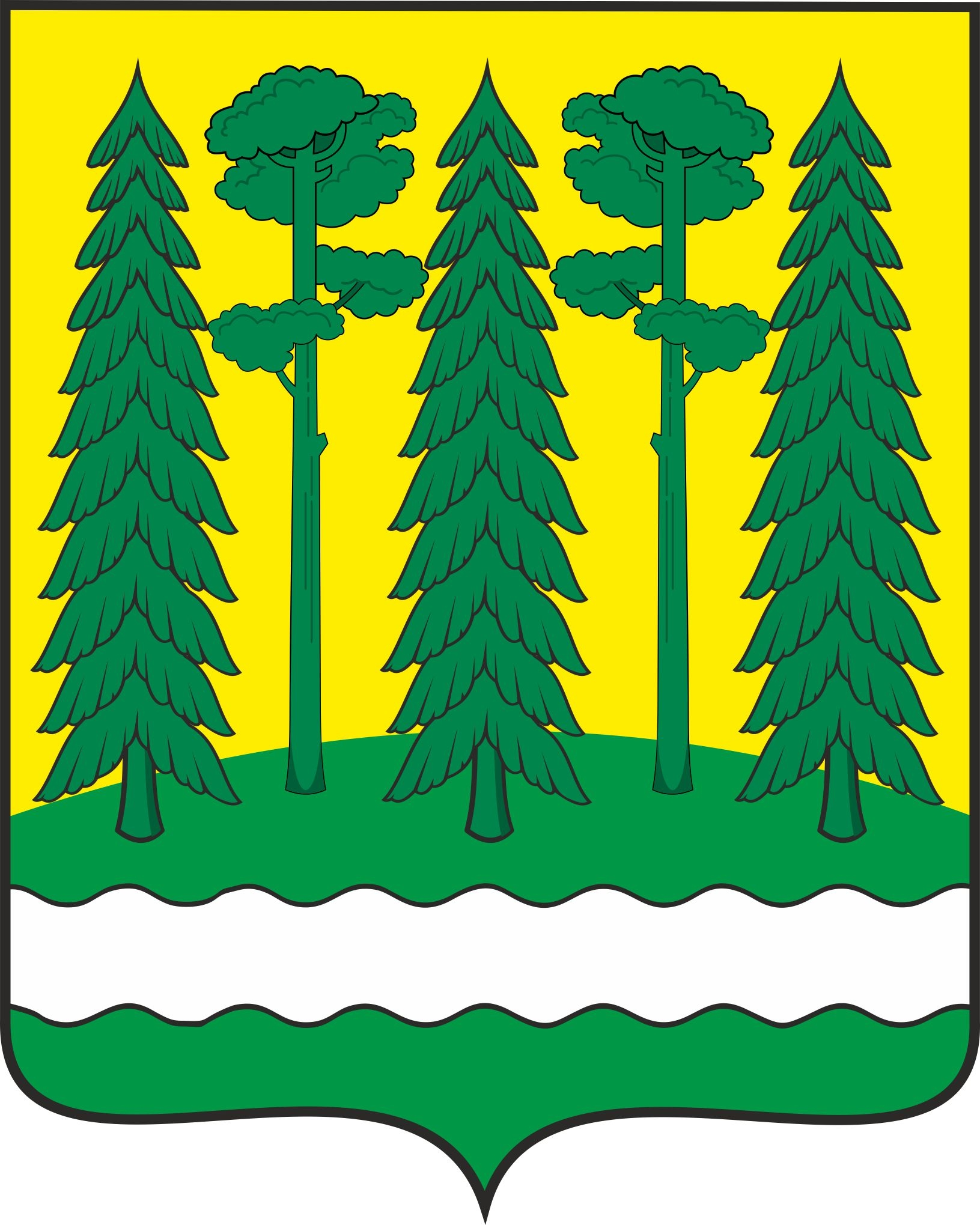
- Flag Coat of arms
- Location of Khvoyninsky District in Novgorod Oblast
- Coordinates: 58°54′N 34°30′E
- Country: Russia
- Federal subject: Novgorod Oblast
- Established: October 1, 1927
- Administrative center: Khvoynaya

Area
  - Total: 3,200 km^{2} (1,200 sq mi)

Population (2010 Census)
  - Total: 15,552
  - Density: 4.9/km^{2} (13/sq mi)
  - Urban: 41.1%
  - Rural: 58.9%

Administrative structure
  - Administrative divisions: 1 Urban-type settlements, 10 Settlements
  - Inhabited localities: 1 urban-type settlements, 150 rural localities

Municipal structure
  - Municipally incorporated as: Khvoyninsky Municipal District
  - Municipal divisions: 1 urban settlements, 10 rural settlements
- Time zone: UTC+3 (MSK)
- OKTMO ID: 49545000
- Website: http://khvoinaya.ru/

Khvoyninsky District (Russian: Хвойнинский район) is an administrative and municipal district (raion), one of the twenty-one in Novgorod Oblast, Russia. It is located in the northeast of the oblast and borders with Boksitogorsky District of Leningrad Oblast in the north, Chagodoshchensky District of Vologda Oblast in the northeast, Pestovsky District in the southeast, Moshenskoy District in the south, Borovichsky District in the southwest, and with Lyubytinsky District in the west. The area of the district is 3,200 square kilometers (1,200 sq mi). Its administrative center is the urban locality (a work settlement) of Khvoynaya. Population: 15,552 (2010 census); 17,173 (2002 Census); 19,649 (1989 Soviet census). The population of Khvoynaya accounts for 41.1% of the district's total population.

== Geography ==
Almost the whole area of the district lies in the basin of the Mologa River. The Kobozha, a major left tributary of the Mologa, crosses the district from south to north. The Pes flows through the center of the district and into Vologda Oblast, where it joins the Chagodoshcha, another major tributary of the Mologa. The rivers in the southwestern part of the district drain into the Uver, a right tributary of the Msta. The district is thus divided between the basins of the Atlantic Ocean and the Caspian Sea.

There are many lakes in the district, especially in the southwest. The biggest ones are Lakes Gorodno, Yamnoye, Vidimirskoye, and Igor. Lake Igor is shared with Moshenskoy District.

== History ==
In the course of the administrative reform carried out in 1708 by Peter the Great, the area was included into Ingermanland Governorate (known since 1710 as Saint Petersburg Governorate). In 1727, separate Novgorod Governorate was split off. In 1776, the area was transferred to Novgorod Viceroyalty. In 1796, the viceroyalty was abolished, and the area, which was part of Borovichsky Uyezd, was transferred to Novgorod Governorate.

In August 1927, the governorates and uyezds were abolished. Minetsky District, with the administrative center in the selo of Mintsy, was established within Borovichi Okrug of Leningrad Oblast effective October 1, 1927. It included Kusheverskaya and Minetskaya Volosts, and a part of Konehanskaya Volost of Borovichsky Uyezd of Novgorod Governorate, as well as a part of Anisimovskaya Volost of Tikhvinsky Uyezd of Cherepovets Governorate. On July 23, 1930, the okrugs were abolished, and the districts were directly subordinated to the oblast. On June 8, 1931, the district's administrative center was transferred to the railway station of Khvoynaya, and the district was renamed Khvoyninsky. On January 1, 1932, a part of abolished Konchansky and Pikalyovsky Districts was merged into Khvoyninsky District. On July 5, 1944, Khvoyninsky District was transferred to newly established Novgorod Oblast, where it remained ever since with a brief interruption between 1963 and 1965. In the course of the abortive administrative reform by Nikita Khrushchev, the district was abolished on December 10, 1962 and merged into Pestovsky Rural District. On December 22, 1962, Khvoyninsky Industrial District was established. On December 11, 1964, Pestovo was granted town status. On January 12, 1965, a part of Khvoyninsky Industrial District was transferred to Lyubytinsky District and the rest was transformed into a regular district. On January 14, 1965, most of the rural territories transferred in 1962 to Pestovsky Rural District were returned to Khvoyninsky District. On August 27, 1965, several inhabited localities of Khvoyninsky District were transferred to Moshenskoy District. On April 13, 1967, several inhabited localities of Lyubytinsky District were transferred to Khvoyninsky District.

=== Abolished districts ===
Effective October 1, 1927, Konchansky District with the administrative center in the selo of Konchanskoye was established as a part of Borovichi Okrug of Leningrad Oblast. On January 1, 1932, Konchansky District was abolished and split between Borovichsky, Moshenskoy, and Khvoyninsky Districts.

Another district established in 1927 as a part of Leningrad Okrug of Leningrad Oblast was Pikalyovsky District, with the administrative center in the selo of Pikalyovo. On January 1, 1932, Pikalyovsky District was abolished and split between Khvoyninsky, Yefimovsky, Tikhvinsky, Dregelsky, and Kapshinsky Districts.

== Economy ==
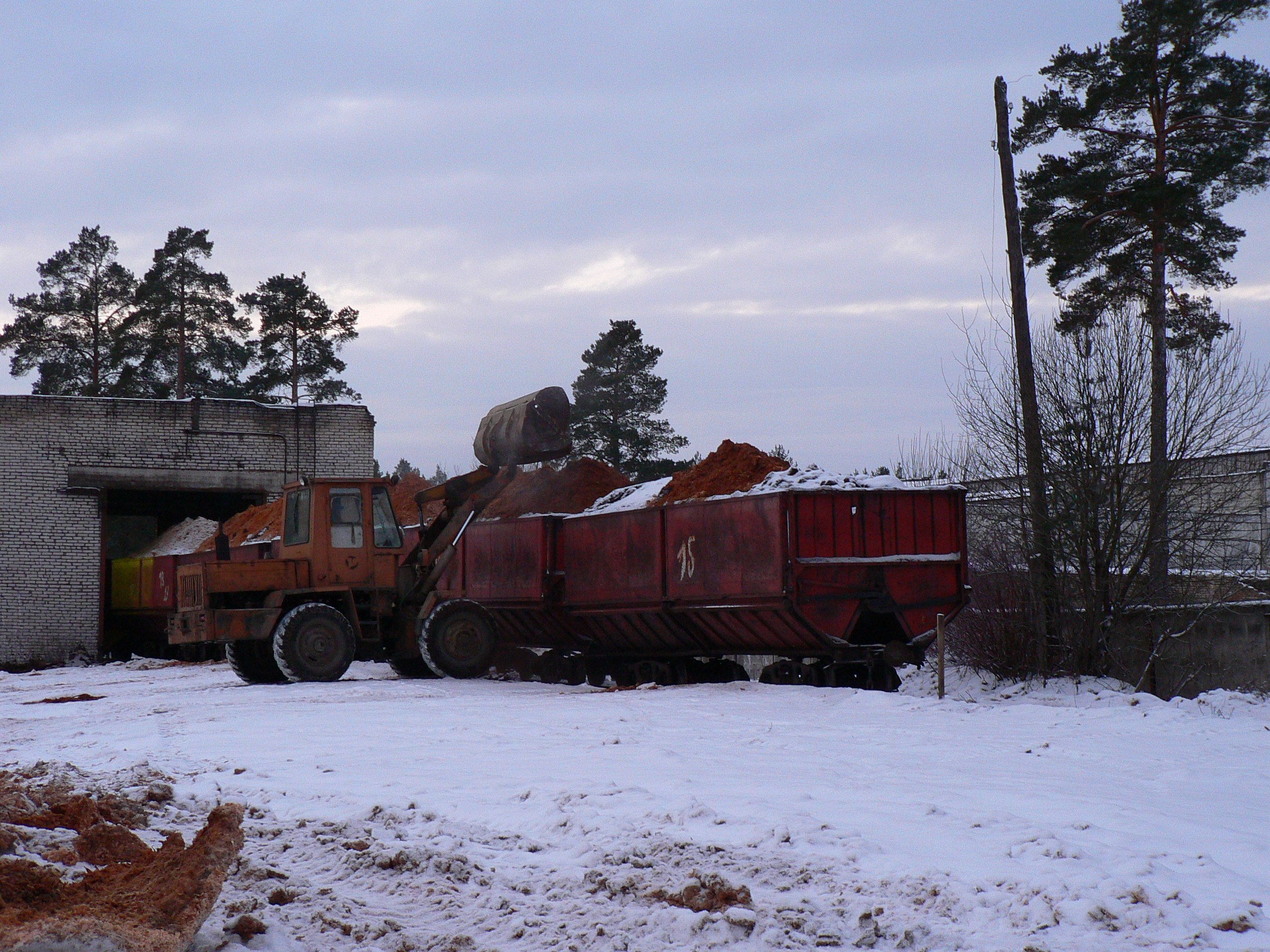
Kushaverskoye peat railway

=== Industry ===
There are enterprises of timber industry and food industry in the district.

=== Agriculture ===
The agriculture within the district mostly specializes in cattle breeding.

=== Transportation ===
The railroad connecting Sonkovo and Mga crosses the district. The main railway station is Khvoynaya. The Kushaverskoye peat narrow gauge railway for hauling peat operates in the district.

In Kabozha, another railway branches off to the north. It passes through Chagoda and runs to Podborovye in Leningrad Oblast, which is located on the line connecting Saint Petersburg to Vologda via Cherepovets.

Roads connect Khvoynaya to Borovichi and Lyubytino. There are also local roads.

== Culture and recreation ==
The district contains 5 cultural heritage monuments of federal significance and additionally 146 objects classified as cultural and historical heritage of local significance. Four of the five federal monuments are archaeological sites, and the fifth one is the Church of St. John the Warrior in the selo of Migoloshchi.

The only museum in the district, the Khvoyninsky District Museum, is located in Khvoynaya.

== Notable residents ==
- Vladimir Kokovtsov (1853 in Borovichi – 1943), Prime Minister of Russia 1911–1914
