= Kobozha =

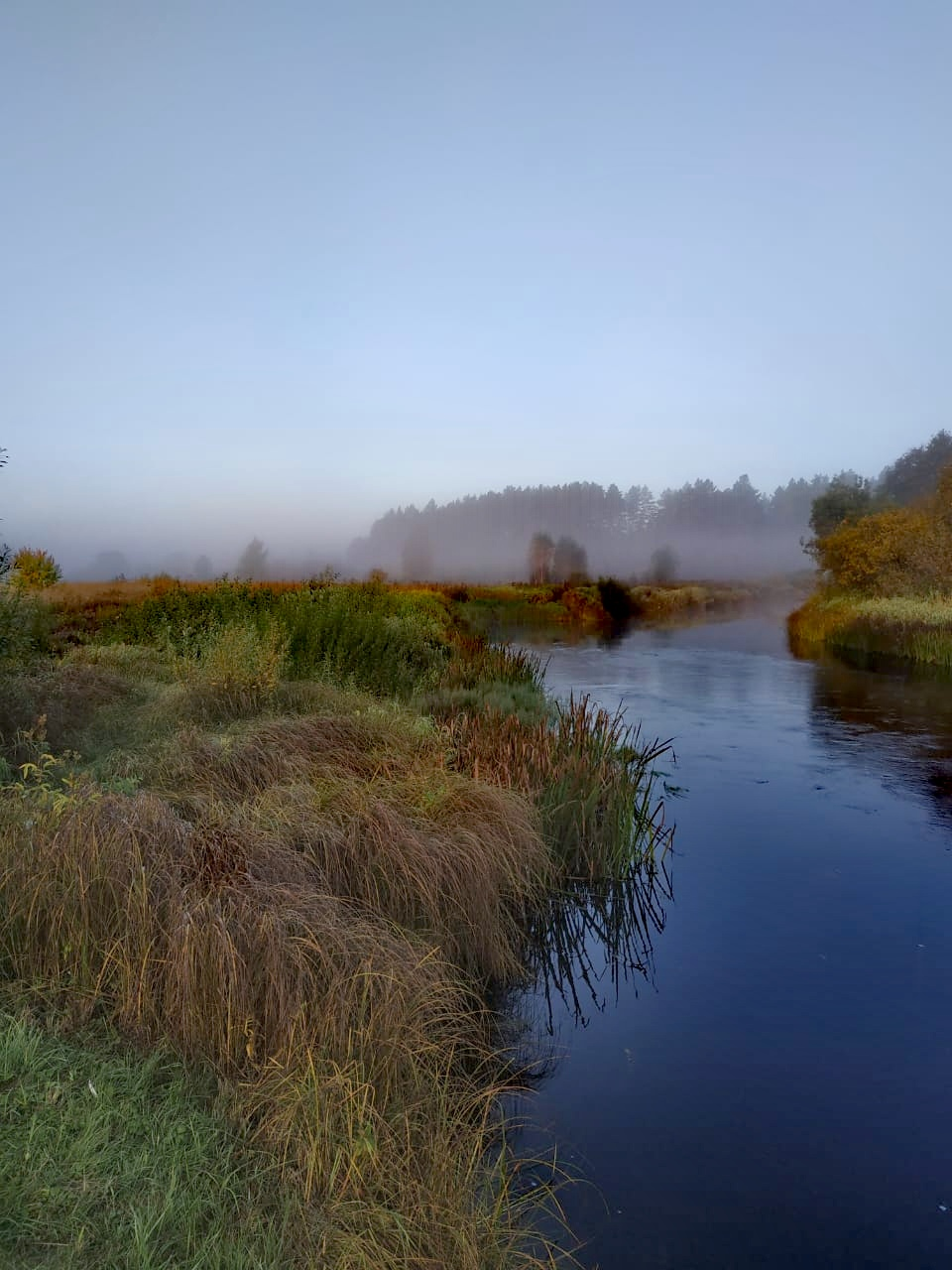

- Map of the Rybinsk Reservoir basin. The Kobozha is shown on the map.
- Native name: Кобожа (Russian)

Location
- Country: Russia

Physical characteristics
- Source
  - location: Lake Velikoye
- Mouth: Mologa
  - coordinates: 58°51′42″N 36°17′10″E
- Length: 184 km (114 mi)
- Basin size: 2,660 km^{2} (1,030 mi^{2})
- Discharge
  - average: 19.5 m^{3}/s (690 cu ft/s)

Basin features
- Progression: Mologa→ Volga→ Caspian Sea

The Kobozha (Russian: Кобожа) is a river in Moshenskoy and Khvoyninsky Districts of Novgorod Oblast and in Chagodoshchensky and Ustyuzhensky Districts of Vologda Oblast in Russia. It is a left tributary of the Mologa. It is 184 kilometres (114 mi) long, and the area of its basin is 2,660 square kilometres (1,030 sq mi).

The source of the Kobozha is in Lake Velikoye in the eastern part of Moshenskoy District, in the east of the Valday Hills. The river flows in a northerly direction, crosses Khvoyninsky District, passing the railway station of Kabozha, and enters Vologda Oblast, where it turns northeast, smoothly turns southeast, and enters Ustyuzhensky District. The mouth of the Kobozha is in the village of Sofrontsevo.

The Kobozha river basin comprises the eastern parts of Moshenskoy and Khvoyninsky districts, as well as the southern part of Chagodoshchensky District and minor areas in Ustyuzhensky District. The areas west of the basin belong to the Msta basin and thus to the basins of the Baltic Sea and the Atlantic Ocean. The Kobozha belongs to the basin of the Caspian Sea.

Until the 1990s, the Kobozha was used for timber rafting.
