= Kushaverskoye peat railway =

Coordinates: 58.83785°N 34.99539°E

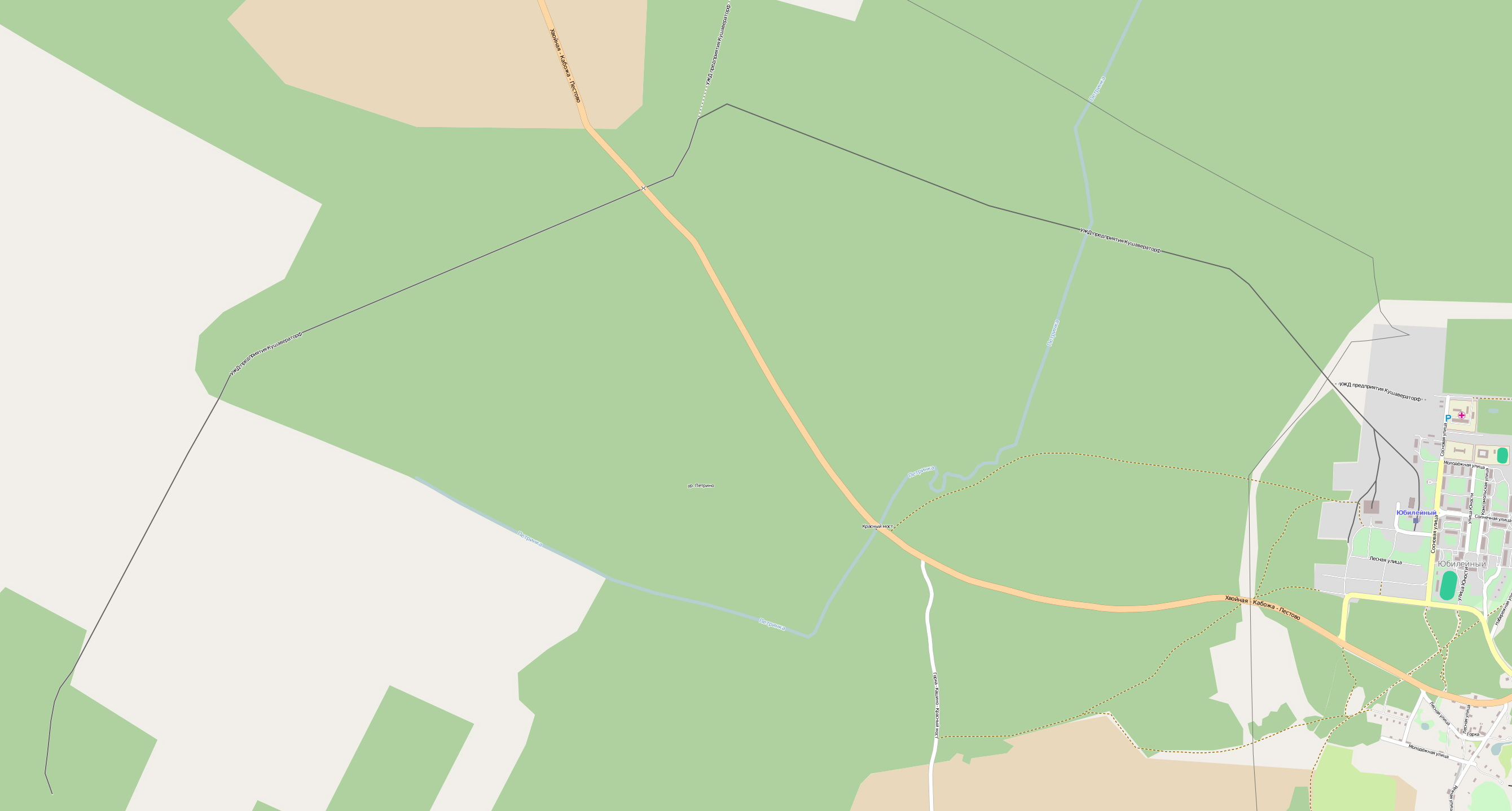

Overview
- Locale: Novgorod Oblast, Russia
- Termini: Yubileyny
- Website: www.ruspeatland.ru

Service
- Type: Narrow-gauge railway
- Operator: LLC «Kushavera peat»

History
- Opened: 1967

Technical
- Line length: 16 kilometres (9.9 mi)
- Track gauge: 750 mm (2 ft 5 1/2 in)

The Kushaverskoye peat railway is located in Novgorod Oblast, Russia. The peat railway was opened in 1967, and has a total length of 16 kilometres (9.9 mi) and is operational as of 2016. The track gauge is 750 mm (2 ft 5 1/2 in) and operates year-round.

== Current status ==
The Kushaverskoye peat railway's first line was constructed in 1967, in the area of Khvoyninsky District, Novgorod Oblast from the village Yubileyny to the swamp peat fields. The peat railway was built for hauling milling peat and workers and operates year-round. The total length of the Kushaverskoye peat narrow-gauge railway at the peak of its development exceeded 60 kilometres (37 mi), of which 16 kilometres (9.9 mi) is currently operational.

== Rolling stock ==
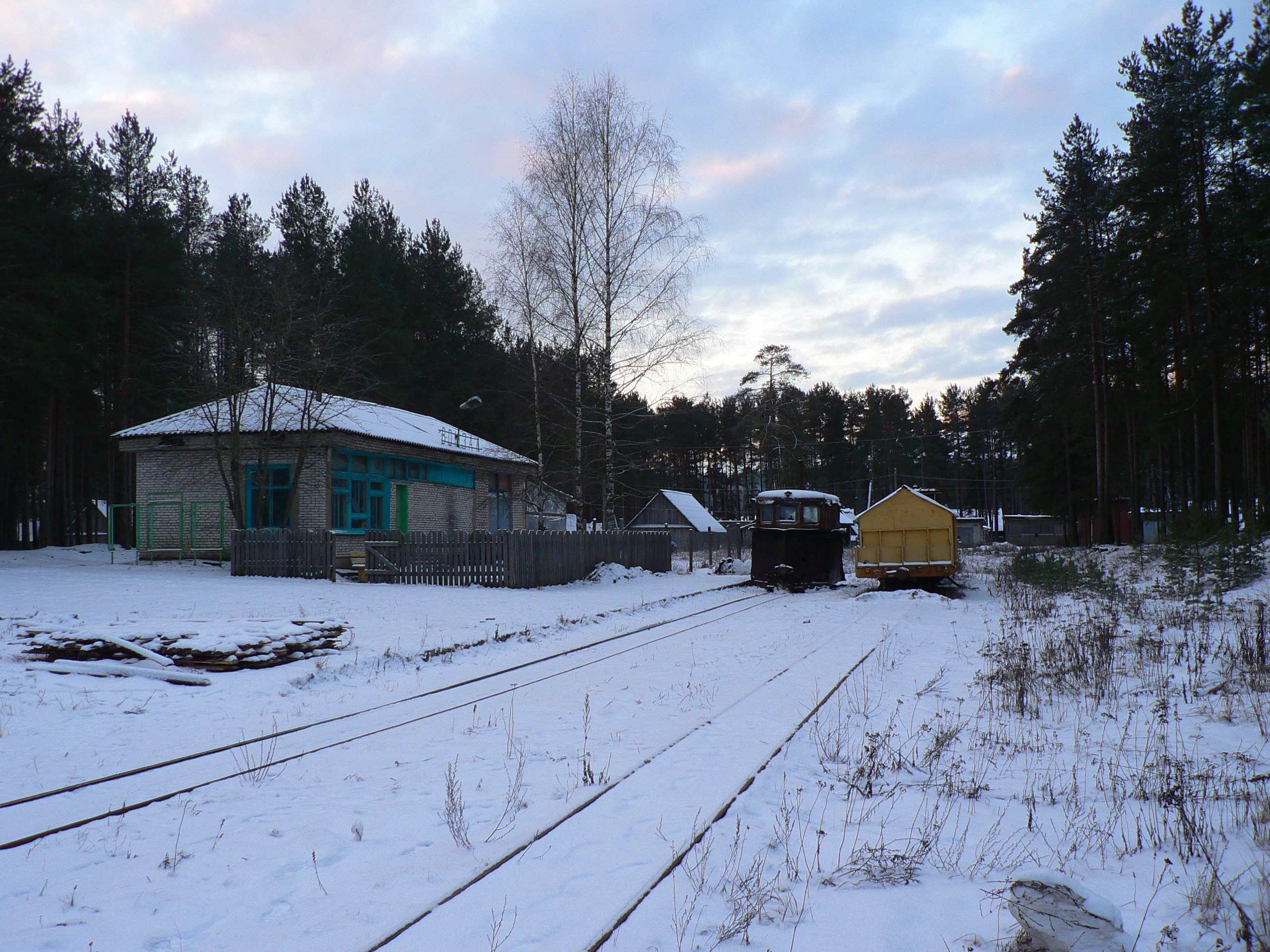
Station

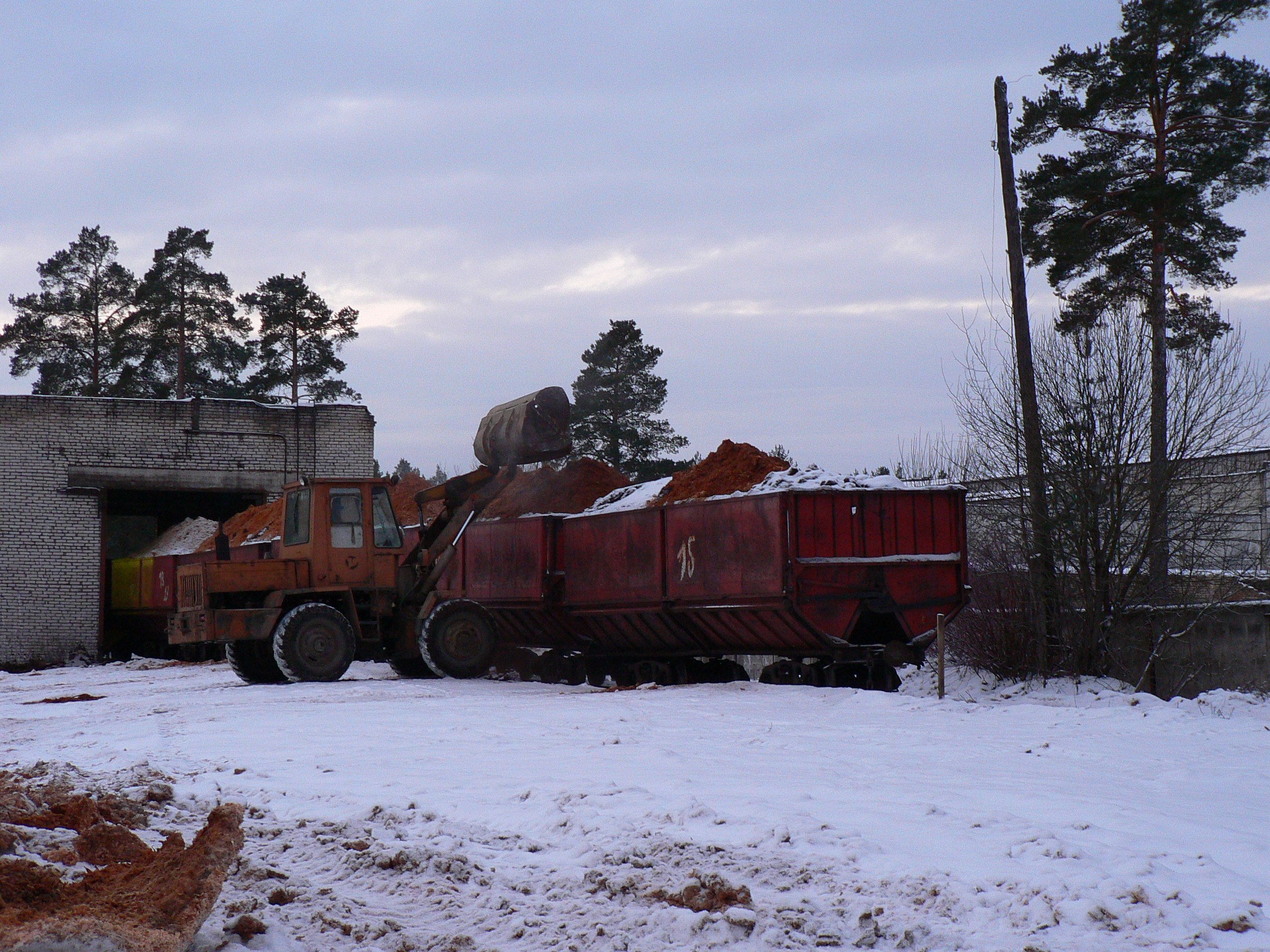
Open wagon TSV-6a for peat

=== Locomotives ===
- TU6D – No. 0236
- TU6P – No. 0013
- TU6A – No. 3263, 3187
- ESU2A – No. 568, 733, 822

=== Railroad car ===
- Flatcar
- Tank car
- Snowplow
- Tank car – fire train
- Passenger car
- Open wagon for peat
- Hopper car to transport track ballast

=== Work trains ===
- Crane GK-5
- Track laying cranes PPR2ma

== Gallery ==
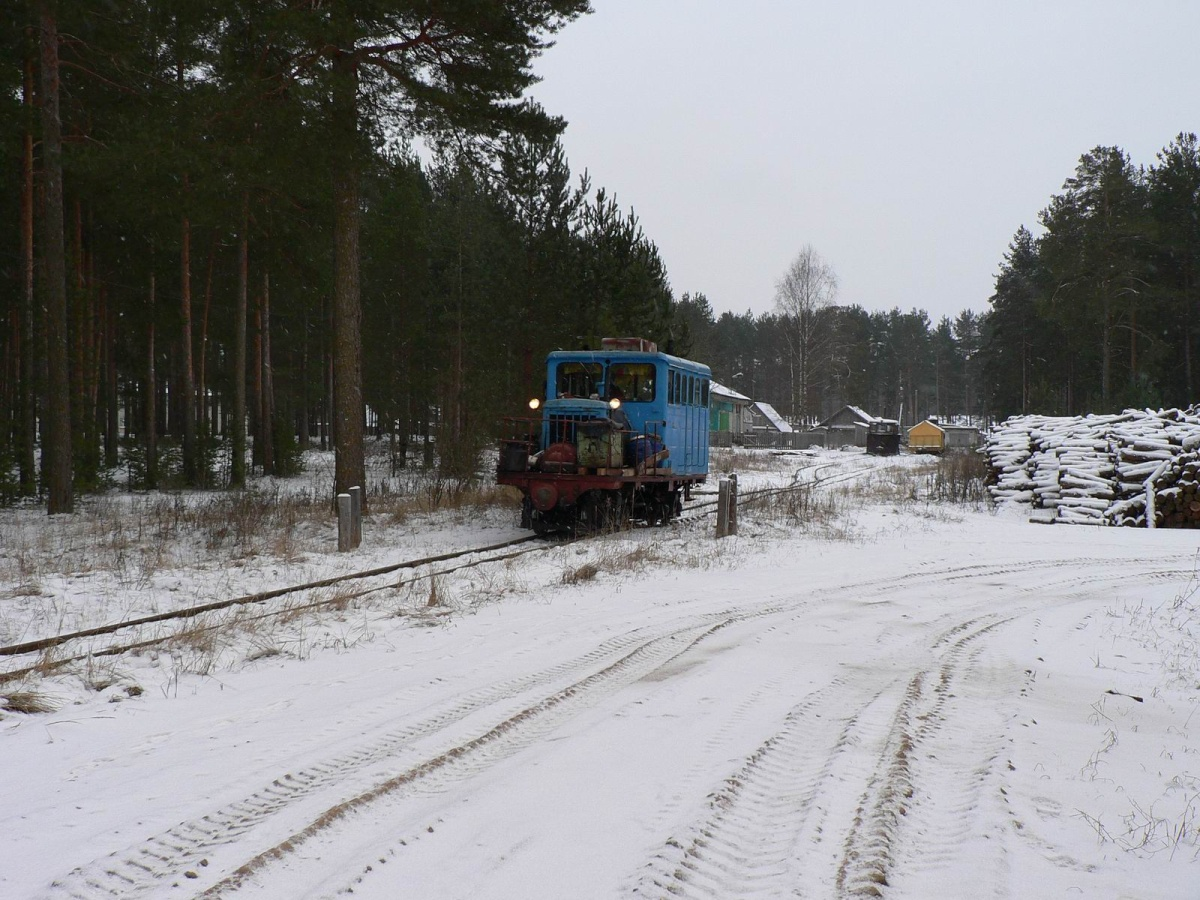
Locomotive ESU2A-568

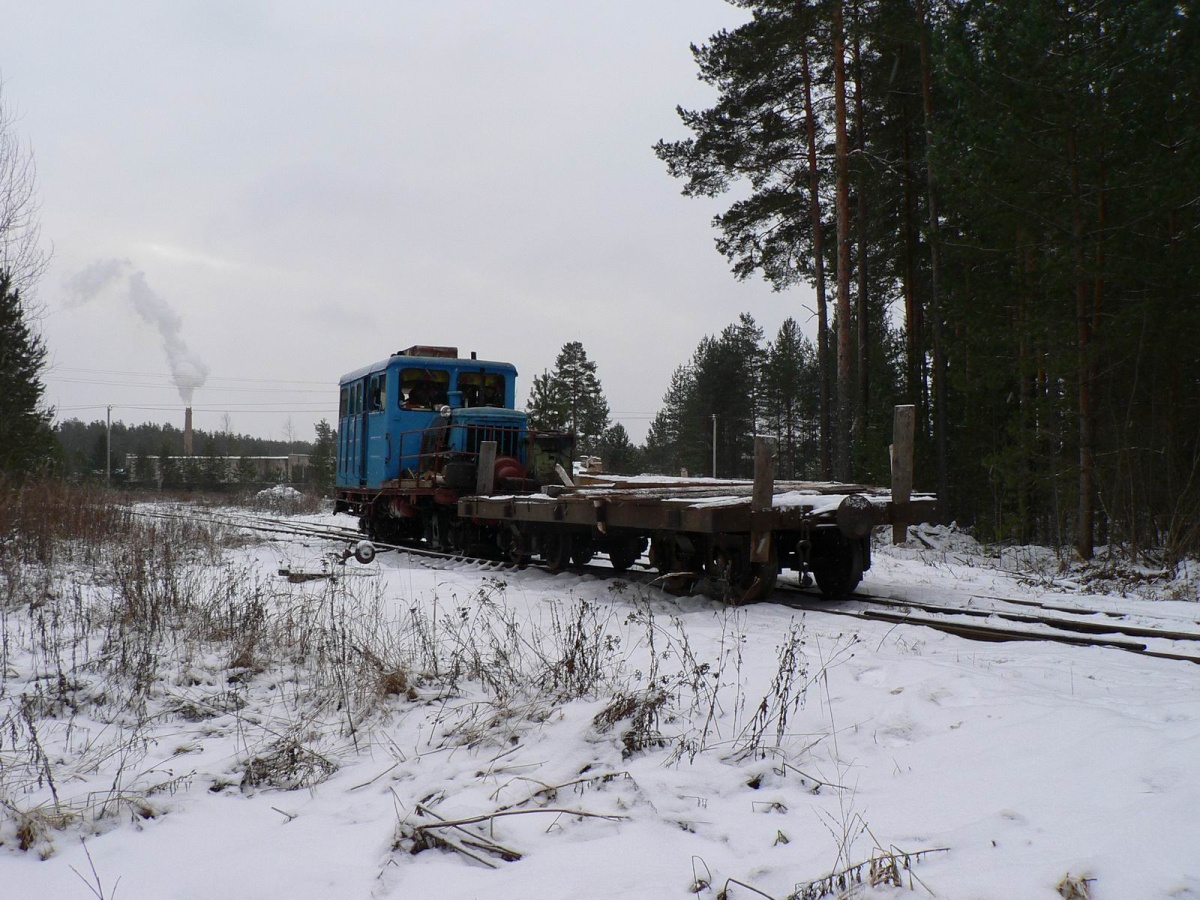
Locomotive ESU2A-568 with freight train

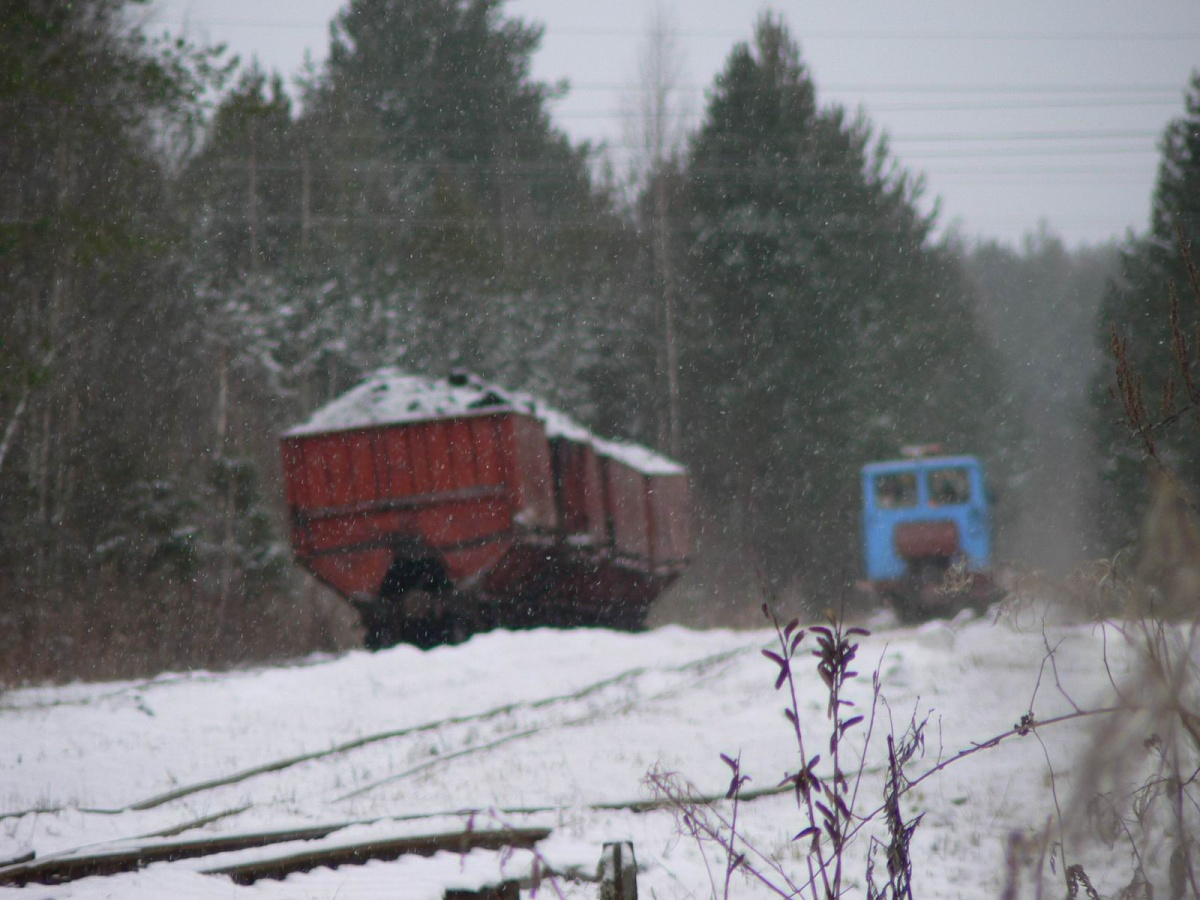
Station

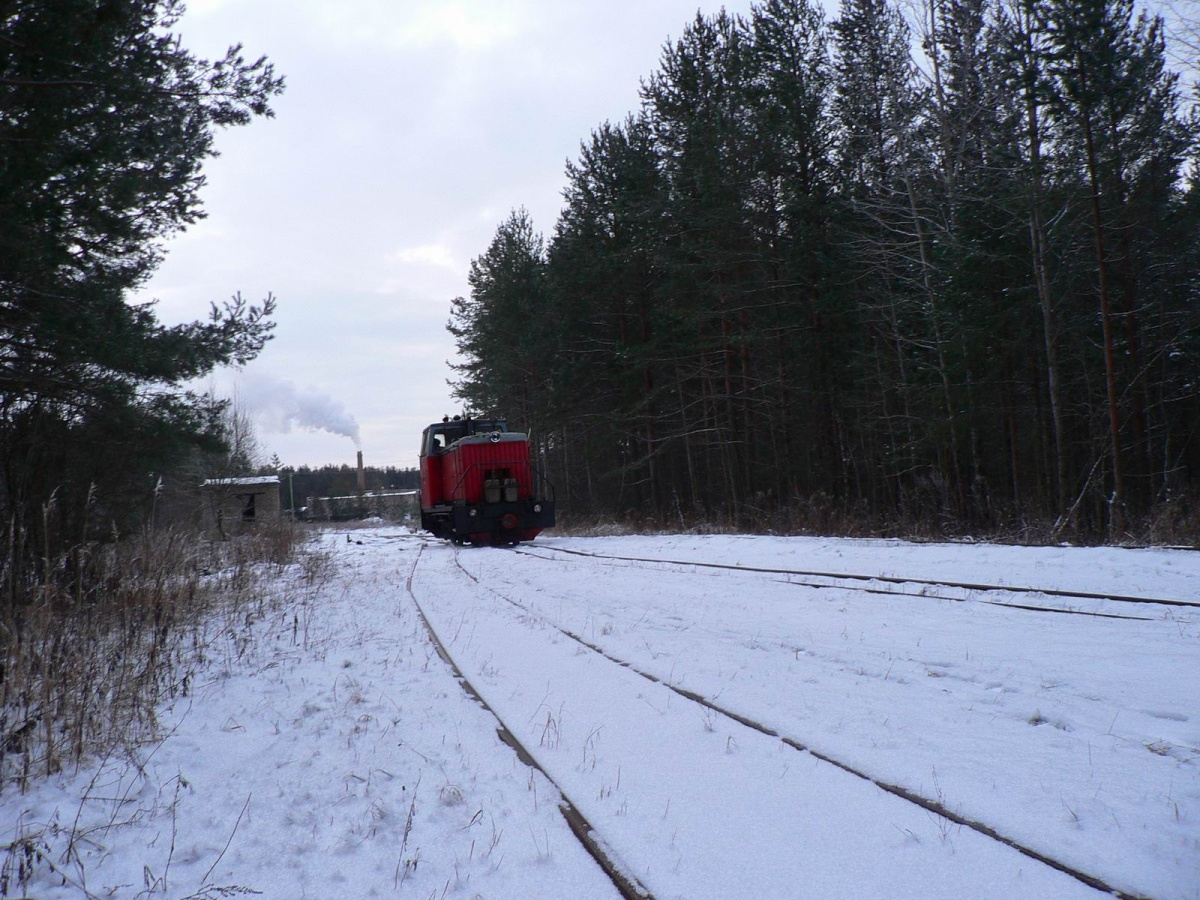
Locomotive TU6A-3187

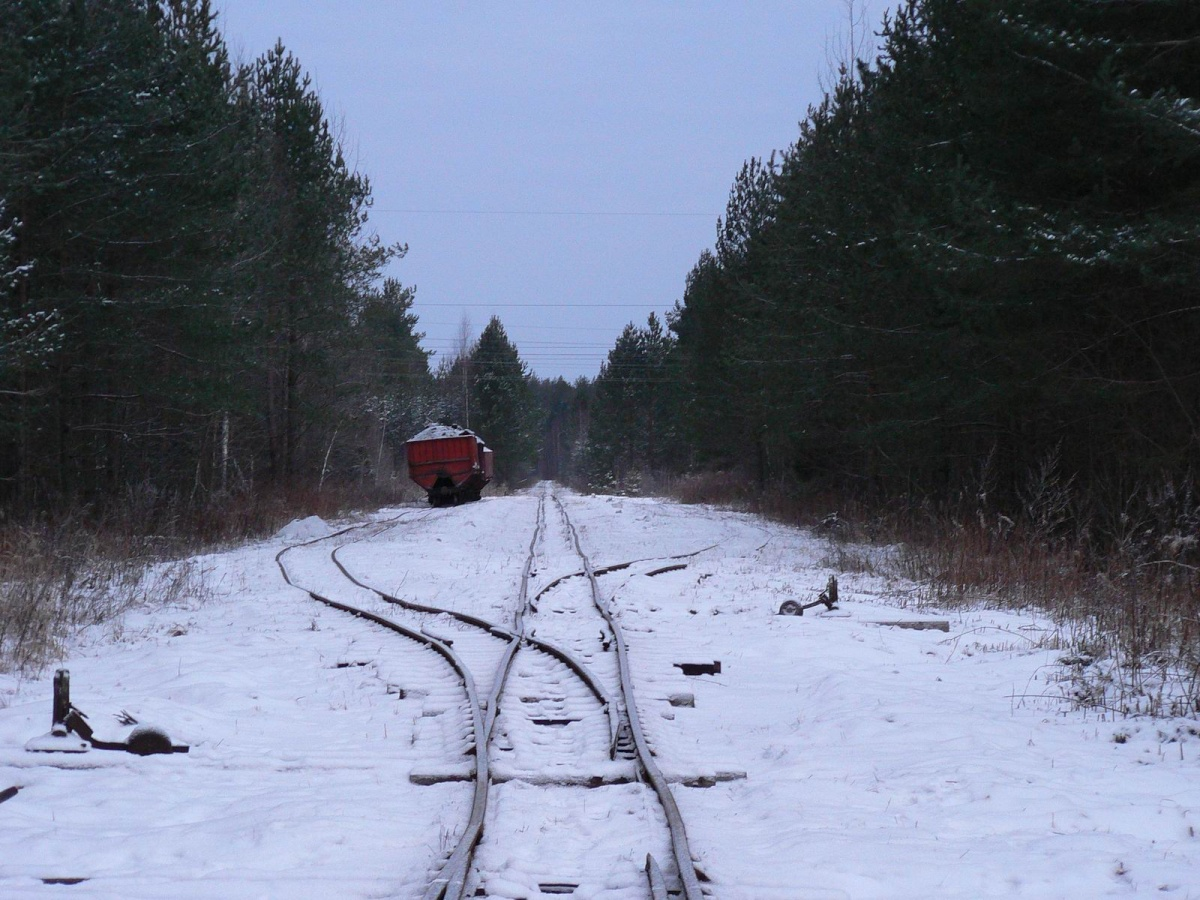
Station

== See also ==
- Narrow-gauge railways in Russia
