= Anisimovo, Chagodoshchensky District, Vologda Oblast =

Anisimovo Анисимово
- Village
- Location within Vologda Oblast Location within Russia
- Coordinates: 59°10′N 35°07′E
- Country: Russia
- Region: Vologda Oblast
- District: Chagodoshchensky District
- Time zone: UTC+3:00

Anisimovo (Russian: Анисимово) is a rural locality (a village) in Pervomayskoye Rural Settlement, Chagodoshchensky District, Vologda Oblast, Russia. The population was 224 as of 2002. There are 9 streets.

== Geography ==
Anisimovo is located 23 km (14 mi) west of Chagoda (the district's administrative centre) by road. Pervomaysky is the nearest rural locality.
