= Khvoynaya, Khvoyninsky District, Novgorod Oblast =

Khvoynaya Хвойная
- Work settlement
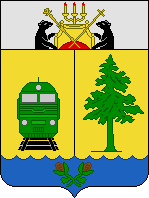
- Coat of arms
- Interactive map of Khvoynaya
- Location of Khvoynaya Khvoynaya (Novgorod Oblast)
- Coordinates: 58°54′N 34°30′E
- Country: Russia
- Federal subject: Novgorod Oblast
- Administrative district: Khvoyninsky District
- Founded: 1927
- Urban-type settlement status since: 1935

Population (2010 Census)
  - Total: 6,394
  - Estimate (2025): 5,884 (−8%)

Administrative status
  - Capital of: Khvoyninsky District

Municipal status
  - Municipal district: Khvoyninsky Municipal District
  - Urban settlement: Khvoyninskoye Urban Settlement
  - Capital of: Khvoyninsky Municipal District, Khvoyninskoye Urban Settlement
- Time zone: UTC+3 (MSK)
- Postal code: 174581
- OKTMO ID: 49645151051

Khvoynaya (Russian: Хво́йная) is an urban locality (a work settlement) and the administrative center of Khvoyninsky District of Novgorod Oblast, Russia, located at the confluence of the Pes and Talka Rivers. Municipally, it is incorporated as Khvoyninskoye Urban Settlement, the only urban settlement in the district. Population: 6,394 (2010 census); 6,791 (2002 census); 7,583 (1989 Soviet census).

== History ==
The settlement of Khvoynaya was founded in 1927 to serve the station on the railroad connecting Sonkovo and Mga. The name in Russian means "in the needle-trees" and was given because the station was located in the pine forest. After August 1, 1927 it was part of Minetsky District of Borovichi Okrug of Leningrad Oblast. On July 23, 1930 the okrugs were abolished, and the districts became directly subordinate to the oblast. On June 8, 1931 the district center was transferred to Khvoynaya, and the district was renamed into Khvoyninsky District. On August 20, 1935 Khvoynaya was granted the status of an urban-type settlement. On July 5, 1944, Khvoyninsky District was transferred to newly established Novgorod Oblast and remained there ever since, with a brief interruption between 1963 and 1965, when the district was abolished as a part of aborted Khrushchyov administrative reform.

== Economy ==
=== Industry ===
There are enterprises of timber industry and food industry in Khvoynaya.

=== Transportation ===
Khvoynaya was founded as a railway station on the railroad connecting Sonkovo and Mga. Later, the motive power depot was transferred to Khvoynaya.

Roads connect Khvoynaya to Borovichi and Lyubytino. There are also local roads.

== Culture and recreation ==
Khvoynaya hosts the Khvoyninsky District Museum, the only museum in the district.
