= Lukinskoye, Vladimir Oblast =

Lukinskoye Лукинское
- Selo
- Location within Vladimir Oblast Location within Russia
- Coordinates: 55°59′N 40°31′E
- Country: Russia
- Region: Vladimir Oblast
- District: Sudogodsky District
- Time zone: UTC+3:00

Lukinskoye (Russian: Лукинское) is a rural locality (a selo) in Golovinskoye Rural Settlement, Sudogodsky District, Vladimir Oblast, Russia. The population was 3 as of 2010.

== Geography ==
Lukinskoye is located 27 km west of Sudogda (the district's administrative centre) by road. Komary is the nearest rural locality.
