= Sazonovo, Kirillovsky District, Vologda Oblast =

Sazonovo Сазоново
- Village
- Location within Vologda Oblast Location within Russia
- Coordinates: 59°55′N 38°52′E
- Country: Russia
- Region: Vologda Oblast
- District: Kirillovsky District
- Time zone: UTC+3:00

Sazonovo (Russian: Сазоново) is a rural locality (a village) in Nikolotorzhskoye Rural Settlement, Kirillovsky District, Vologda Oblast, Russia. The population was 8 as of 2002.

== Geography ==
Sazonovo is located 36 km northeast of Kirillov (the district's administrative centre) by road. Minchakovo is the nearest rural locality.
