= Sazonovo, Chagodoshchensky District, Vologda Oblast =

Sazonovo Сазоново
- Urban-type settlement
- Interactive map of Sazonovo
- Location of Sazonovo Sazonovo (Vologda Oblast)
- Coordinates: 59°10′N 35°20′E
- Country: Russia
- Federal subject: Vologda Oblast
- Administrative district: Chagodoshchensky District
- Founded: 1923
- Urban-type settlement status since: 1947

Population (2010 Census)
  - Total: 3,226
  - Estimate (2023): 2,680 (−16.9%)

Administrative status
  - Capital of: Belokrestetsky Selsoviet

Municipal status
  - Municipal district: Chagodoshchensky Municipal District
  - Urban settlement: Sazonovo Urban Settlement
  - Capital of: Sazonovo Urban Settlement
- Time zone: UTC+3 (MSK)
- Postal codes: 162431, 162430
- OKTMO ID: 19654162051

Sazonovo (Russian: Сазоново) is an urban locality (an urban-type settlement) in Chagodoshchensky District of Vologda Oblast, Russia, situated on the Pes River, a tributary of the Chagodoshcha River. It serves as the administrative center of Belokrestsky Selsoviet, one of the seven selsoviets into which Chagodoshchensky District is administratively divided. Municipally, it is incorporated as Sazonovo Urban Settlement, one of the two urban settlements in the district. Population: 3,226 (2010 census); 3,578 (2002 census); 4,377 (1989 Soviet census).

== History ==
Sazonovo was founded in 1923 as a selo around the Pokrovsky (since 1924 Sazonovsky) glass-making factory. It had the name of Belye Kresty and belonged to Ustyuzhensky Uyezd of Cherepovets Governorate. On August 1, 1927 Cherepovets Governorate was abolished, and its area became Cherepovets Okrug of Leningrad Oblast. Simultaneously, uyezds were abolished, and Verkhne-Chagodoshchensky District was established, with the center in Belye Kresty. In 1932 the district was renamed into Chagodoshchensky District, and between 1932 and 1935, the district center was located in the urban-type settlement of Bely Bychok (currently Chagoda), but in 1935 it was transferred back to Belye Kresty. On September 23, 1937 Chagodoshchensky District was transferred to newly established Vologda Oblast. In 1947, Belye Kresty was renamed into Sazonovo and obtained the status of urban-type settlement. During the aborted administrative reform of the 1960s, Chagodoshchensky District was briefly disestablished and then reestablished in 1965. After the reestablishment, Chagoda became the district center.

== Economy ==
=== Industry ===
The Pokrovsky glass-making factory was founded in 1860 and renamed into Sazonovsky glass-making factory in 1924 in memory of the worker Denis Sazonov who died in an accident on the factory. It is still in operation.

=== Transportation ===
A114 highway, connecting Vologda to Cherepovets and Saint Petersburg, passes the northern outskirts of Sazonovo. There is a connecting road to Chagoda and local roads, but no other through roads to other districts or to Leningrad or Novgorod Oblasts.

A railway line connecting the stations of Kabozha (in Novgorod Oblast) and Podborovye (Leningrad Oblast) runs through Chagodoshchensky District from the south to the north. The station of Ogaryovo is located in Sazonovo.

A narrow-gauge railroad which connected Sazonovo with the selo of Borisovo and was used for peat transportation and for passenger service has been discontinued.
