= Sazonovo, Vologodsky District, Vologda Oblast =

Sazonovo Сазоново
- Village
- Location within Vologda Oblast Location within Russia
- Coordinates: 59°41′N 39°14′E
- Country: Russia
- Region: Vologda Oblast
- District: Vologodsky District
- Time zone: UTC+3:00

Sazonovo (Russian: Сазоново) is a rural locality (a village) in Novlenskoye Rural Settlement, Vologodsky District, Vologda Oblast, Russia. The population was 9 as of 2002.

== Geography ==
Sazonovo is located 69 km northwest of Vologda (the district's administrative centre) by road. Kobelevo is the nearest rural locality.
