= Lukinskoye, Cherepovetsky District, Vologda Oblast =

Lukinskoye Лукинское
- Village
- Location within Vologda Oblast Location within Russia
- Coordinates: 58°52′N 38°13′E
- Country: Russia
- Region: Vologda Oblast
- District: Cherepovetsky District
- Time zone: UTC+3:00

Lukinskoye (Russian: Лукинское) is a rural locality (a village) in Myaksinskoye Rural Settlement, Cherepovetsky District, Vologda Oblast, Russia. The population was 8 as of 2002.

== Geography ==
Lukinskoye is located 37 km (23 mi) southeast of Cherepovets (the district's administrative centre) by road. Dobrynskoye is the nearest rural locality.
