= Anisimovo, Sheksninsky District, Vologda Oblast =

Anisimovo Анисимово
- Village
- Location within Vologda Oblast Location within Russia
- Coordinates: 59°19′N 38°28′E
- Country: Russia
- Region: Vologda Oblast
- District: Sheksninsky District
- Time zone: UTC+3:00

Anisimovo (Russian: Анисимово) is a rural locality (a village) in Yershovskoye Rural Settlement, Sheksninsky District, Vologda Oblast, Russia. The population was 9 as of 2002.

== Geography ==
Anisimovo is located 27 km (17 mi) north of Sheksna (the district's administrative centre) by road. Lgovo is the nearest rural locality.
