= Chagoda =

Chagoda Чагода
- Urban-type settlement
- Interactive map of Chagoda
- Location of Chagoda Chagoda (Vologda Oblast)
- Coordinates: 59°10′N 35°20′E
- Country: Russia
- Federal subject: Vologda Oblast
- Administrative district: Chagodoshchensky District
- Founded: 1926
- Urban-type settlement status since: 1932

Population (2010 Census)
  - Total: 6,920
  - Estimate (2023): 5,603 (−19%)

Administrative status
  - Capital of: Chagodoshchensky District

Municipal status
  - Municipal district: Chagodoshchensky Municipal District
  - Urban settlement: Chagoda Urban Settlement
  - Capital of: Chagoda Urban Settlement
- Time zone: UTC+3 (MSK)
- Postal code: 162401
- OKTMO ID: 19654151051

Chagoda (Russian: Ча́года) is an urban locality (an urban-type settlement) and the administrative center of Chagodoshchensky District of Vologda Oblast, Russia, situated on the river Chagodoshcha (Volga's basin) 326 kilometers (203 mi) from Vologda. Municipally, it is incorporated as Chagoda Urban Settlement, one of the two urban settlements in the district. Population: 6,920 (2010 census); 7,432 (2002 census); 8,171 (1989 Soviet census).

It was previously known as Bely Bychok (until 1939).

== History ==
The settlement of Chagoda was founded in 1926 as Bely Bychok to serve a new glass making factory. At the time, it belonged to Ustyuzhensky Uyezd of Novgorod Governorate. In June 1918, five uyezds of Novgorod Governorate, including Ustyuzhensky Uyezd, were split off to form Cherepovets Governorate, with the administrative center in Cherepovets. On August 1, 1927 Cherepovets Governorate was abolished, and its area became Cherepovets Okrug of Leningrad Oblast. Simultaneously, uyezds were abolished, and Bely Bychok became part of Verkhne-Chagodoshchensky District (with the center is the selo of Belye Kresty). In 1932 the district was renamed into Chagodoshchensky District, and Bely Bychok obtained the status of urban-type settlement. Between 1932 and 1935, the district center was located in Bely Bychok, but in 1935 it was transferred back to Belye Kresty. On September 23, 1937 Chagodoshchensky District was transferred to newly established Vologda Oblast. In 1939, Bely Bychok was renamed into Chagoda. During the aborted administrative reform of the 1960s, Chagodoshchensky District was briefly disestablished and then reestablished in 1965. After the reestablishment, Chagoda became the administrative center of the district.

== Economy ==
=== Industry ===
Chagoda owes its existence to the glass-making factory. In 1997, the factory stopped operation but subsequently was reopened. Other industrial enterprises belong to food industry (production of bread and butter).

=== Transportation ===
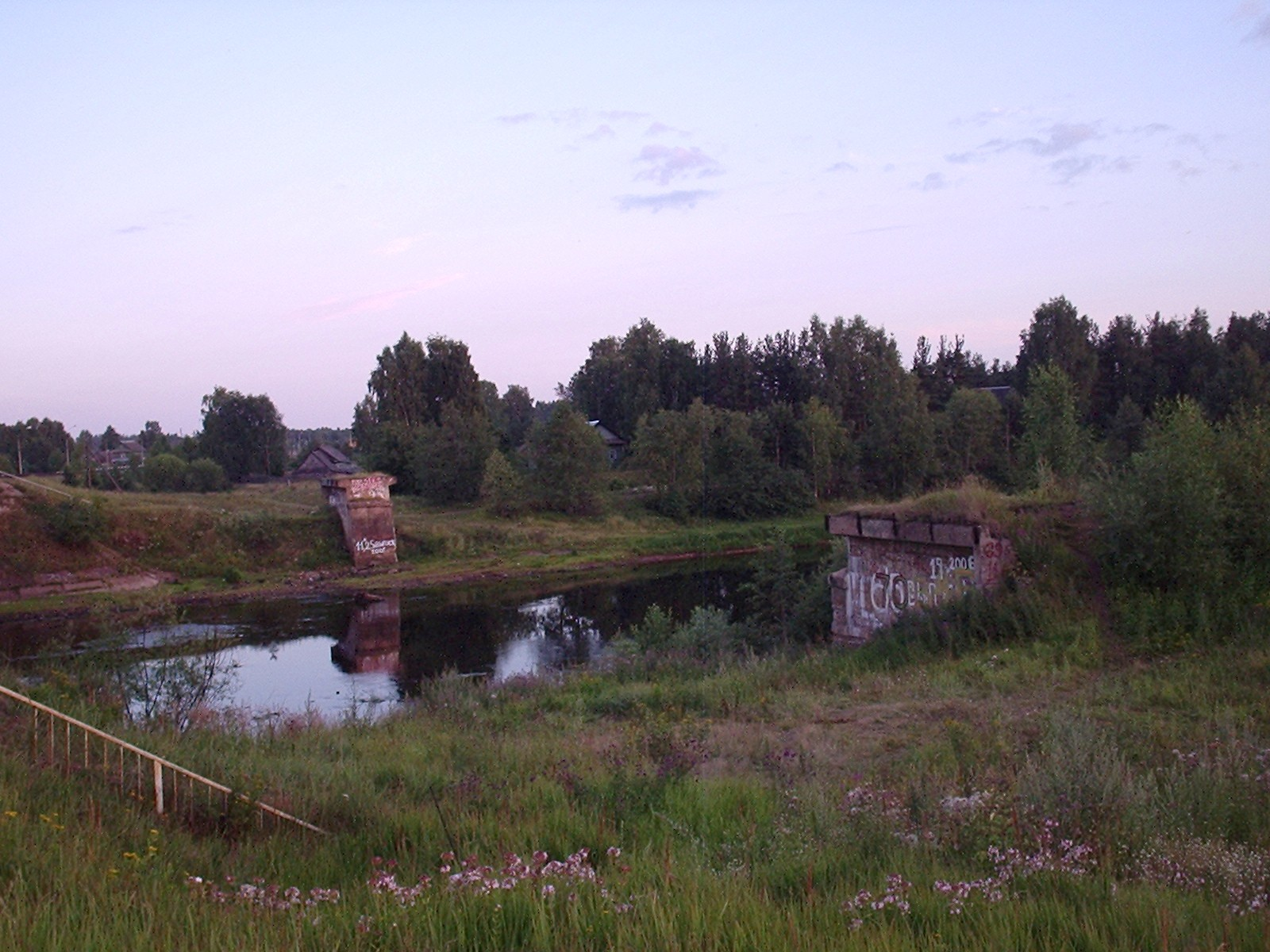
A demolished bridge over the Chagodoshcha River

A114 highway, connecting Vologda to Cherepovets and Saint Petersburg, bypasses Chagoda, which has a connecting road leading to the highway. There are also local roads, but no other through roads to other districts or to Leningrad or Novgorod Oblasts.

A railway line connecting the stations of Kabozha (in Novgorod Oblast) and Podborovye (Leningrad Oblast) runs through Chagoda.

== Culture and recreation ==
The only museum in Chagodoshchensky district, Chagodoshchensky District Museum, is located in Chagoda. It opened on 1994 and displays collections of local interest, including expositions on glass production.
