= Chagodoshchensky District =

Chagodoshchensky District Чагодощенский район (Russian)
- District
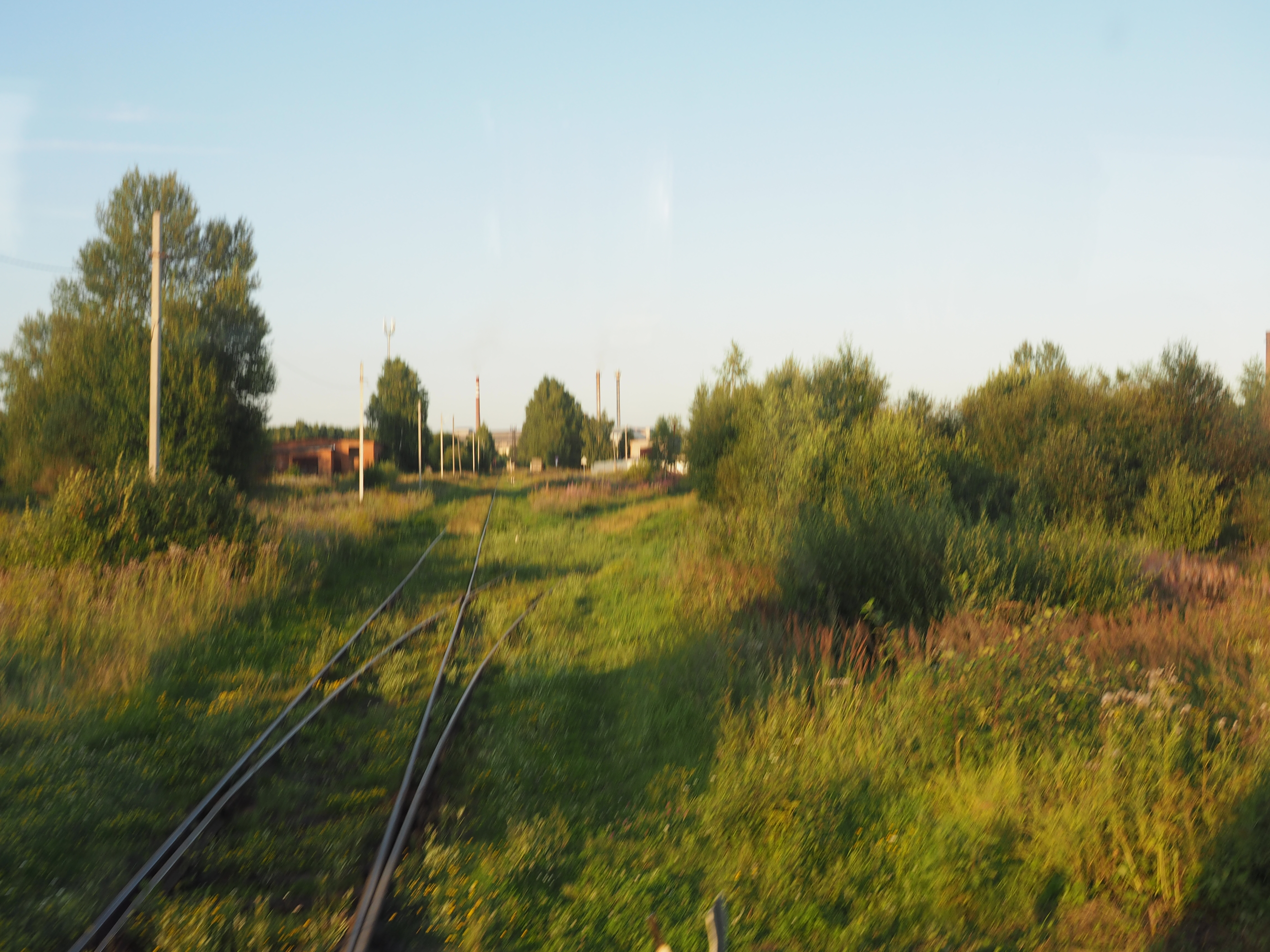
- Landscape in Chagodoshchensky District

- Flag Coat of arms
- Location of Chagodoshchensky District in Vologda Oblast
- Coordinates: 59°10′N 35°20′E
- Country: Russia
- Federal subject: Vologda Oblast
- Established: August 1, 1927
- Administrative center: Chagoda

Area
  - Total: 2,400 km^{2} (930 sq mi)

Population (2010 Census)
  - Total: 13,865
  - Density: 5.8/km^{2} (15/sq mi)
  - Urban: 73.2%
  - Rural: 26.8

Administrative structure
  - Administrative divisions: 2 Urban-type settlements, 7 Selsoviets
  - Inhabited localities: 2 urban-type settlements, 90 rural localities

Municipal structure
  - Municipally incorporated as: Chagodoshchensky Municipal District
  - Municipal divisions: 2 urban settlements, 7 rural settlements
- Time zone: UTC+3 (MSK)
- OKTMO ID: 19654000
- Website: http://www.chagoda.ru/

Chagodoshchensky District (Russian: Чагодо́щенский райо́н) is an administrative and municipal district (raion), one of the twenty-six in Vologda Oblast, Russia. It is located in the southwest of the oblast and borders with Babayevsky District in the northeast, Ustyuzhensky District in the southeast, Pestovsky District of Novgorod Oblast in the south, Khvoyninsky District of Novgorod Oblast in the southwest, and with Boksitogorsky District of Leningrad Oblast in the northwest. The area of the district is 2,400 square kilometers (930 sq mi). Its administrative center is the urban locality (a work settlement) of Chagoda. Population: 13,865 (2010 census); 15,624 (2002 Census); 17,866 (1989 Soviet census). The population of Chagoda accounts for 49.9% of the district's total population.

== Geography ==
The whole area of the district belongs to the basins of the Chagodoshcha and the Kobozha Rivers, left tributaries of the Mologa, and ultimately to the basin of the Volga River. Much of the district area is covered by forests. There are also swamps. The biggest swamp, Uglishnoye Boloto, is located in the north of the district and is shared with Babayevsky and Boksitogorsky Districts. The landscape of the district is flat.

== History ==
The area was sparsely populated until the 19th century. In the course of the administrative reform carried out in 1708 by Peter the Great, it was included into Ingermanland Governorate (known since 1710 as Saint Petersburg Governorate). In 1727, separate Novgorod Governorate was split off. In 1776, the area was transferred to Novgorod Viceroyalty. In 1796, the viceroyalty was abolished, and the area, which was a part of Ustyuzhensky Uyezd, was transferred to Novgorod Governorate.

In 1839, the first glass production factory was founded, close to the village of Anisimovo. This factory was in operation until 1914. In 1874 and 1897, two further glass production factories were built. The settlement of Chagoda was founded in 1926 as Bely Bychok to serve a new glass making factory.

In June 1918, five uyezds of Novgorod Governorate, including Ustyuzhensky Uyezd, were split off to form Cherepovets Governorate, with the administrative center in Cherepovets. On August 1, 1927, Cherepovets Governorate was abolished, and its area became Cherepovets Okrug of Leningrad Oblast. Simultaneously, the uyezds were abolished, and Verkhne-Chagodoshchensky District was established, with the administrative center in the selo of Belye Kresty. In 1932, the district was renamed Chagodoshchensky, and Bely Bychok was granted urban-type settlement status. Between 1932 and 1935, the administrative center of the district was in the urban-type settlement of Bely Bychok, but in 1935 it was transferred back to Belye Kresty. On September 23, 1937, Chagodoshchensky District was transferred to newly established Vologda Oblast. In 1939, Bely Bychok was renamed Chagoda. In 1947, Belye Kresty was renamed Sazonovo and was granted urban-type settlement status. During the abortive Khrushchyov administrative reform of the 1960s, Chagodoshchensky District was briefly disestablished in 1962 and then reestablished in 1965. After the reestablishment, Chagoda became the administrative center of the district.

== Economy ==
=== Industry ===
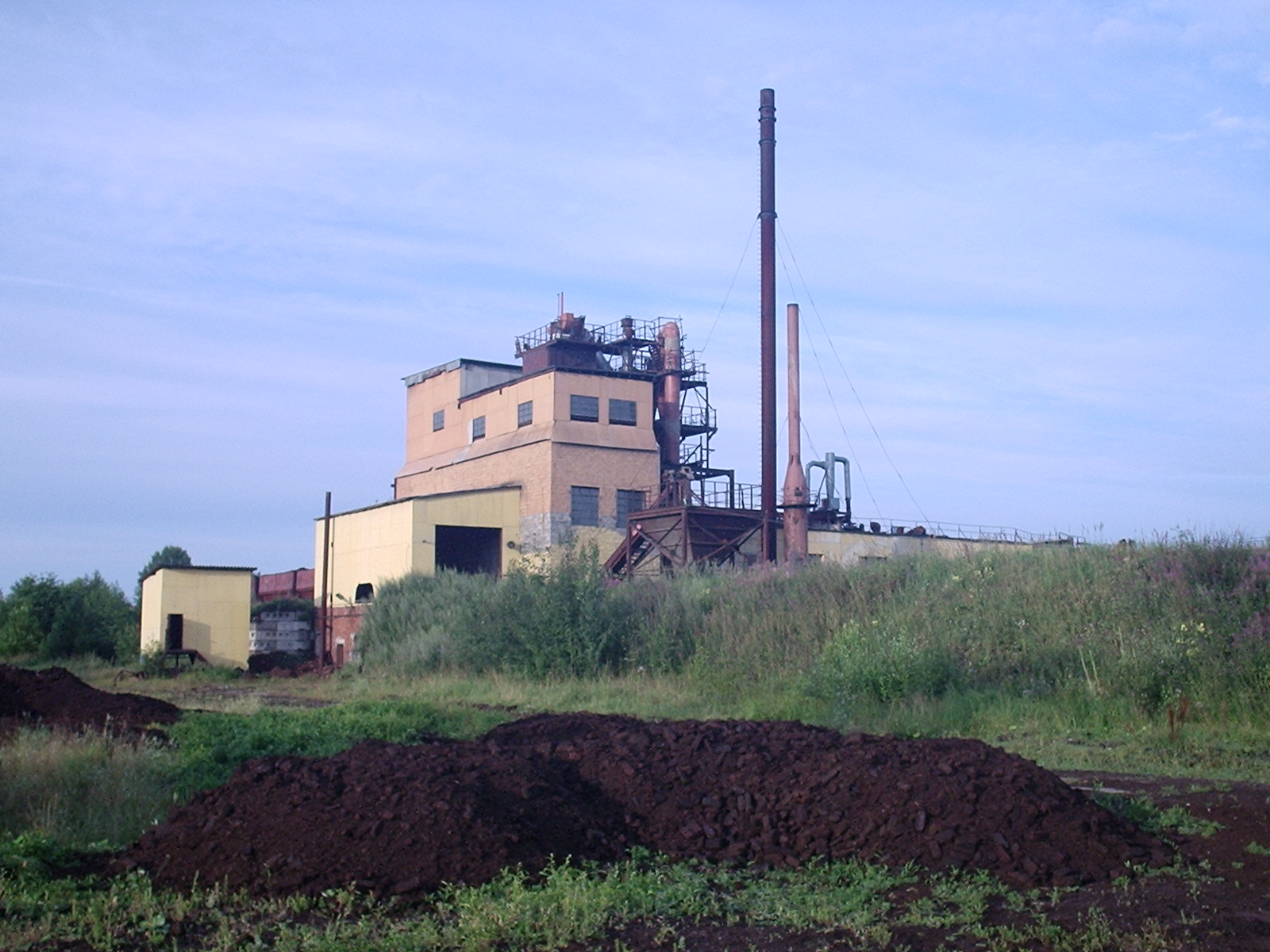
The turf production factory in the settlement of Borisovo

While the district and its administrative center owe their existence to the glass-making industry, this industry branch eventually decayed, and in 1997 the biggest surviving glass-making factory, located in Chagoda, stopped operation. Subsequently, it was reopened. As of 2011, three glass-making factories were operating in the district. Other industrial enterprises in the district belong to timber industry and food industry (production of bread and butter).

=== Agriculture ===
Agriculture in the district is based on milk production.

=== Transportation ===
A114 highway, connecting Vologda to Cherepovets and St. Petersburg, crosses the district from east to west, passing Sazonovo. There is a connecting road to Chagoda and local roads, but no other through roads to other districts or to Leningrad or Novgorod Oblasts.

A railway line connecting the stations of Kabozha (in Novgorod Oblast) and Podborovye (in Leningrad Oblast) runs through the district from south to north. Chagoda has a railway station, whereas Sazonovo is located close to the station of Ogaryovo. The two ends of the line are located on two main lines. Kabozha is located on the line connecting St. Petersburg with Sonkovo and eventually with Moscow, whereas Podborovye is located on the line connecting St. Petersburg to Vologda via Cherepovets.

A considerable part of the Tikhvinskaya water system, one of the waterways constructed in the early 19th century to connect the basins of the Volga and the Neva Rivers, lies in Chagodoshchensky District. The waterway runs from the Syas upstream the Tikhvinka River. Lake Yelgino is connected by the Tikhvin Canal, 6 kilometers (3.7 mi) with the upper course of the Volchina River. The waterway then follows downstream the Gorun River, the Chagodoshcha River, and the Mologa River. Currently, it is not used for any commercial navigation.

== Culture and recreation ==
The only museum in the district, the Chagodoshchensky District Museum, is located in Chagoda. It opened in 1994 and displays collections of local interest, including expositions on glass production.
