= Dobrets =

Dobrets Добрец
- Village
- Location within Vologda Oblast Location within Russia
- Coordinates: 59°09′N 38°20′E
- Country: Russia
- Region: Vologda Oblast
- District: Sheksninsky District
- Time zone: UTC+3:00

Dobrets (Russian: Добрец) is a rural locality (a village) in Zheleznodorozhnoye Rural Settlement, Sheksninsky District, Vologda Oblast, Russia. The population was 72 as of 2002.

== Geography ==
Dobrets is located 15 km southwest of Sheksna (the district's administrative centre) by road. Krasny Kholm (former Matukovo) is the nearest rural locality.

== History ==
First noted in sources in 1477: Belozersk prince. Mikhail Andreevich granted the village of Doboets to the Moscow Simonov Monastery (ASEI, P. No. 390). Soon the village became uninhabited, so the charter of 1485 already speaks of the Dobrets wasteland (ibid., No. 397).

== Etymology of Name ==
From the old Russian male personal name Dobry. The same-root names Dobrilo and Dobrynya were very active in Rus' in the 14th – 16th centuries. Toponyms -ets are often found in the southern part of Belozerye: Pashnets, Yuryevets, Ovinets, etc.
