= Kameshnik, Sheksninsky District, Vologda Oblast =

Kameshnik Камешник
- Village
- Location within Vologda Oblast Location within Russia
- Coordinates: 59°33′N 38°22′E
- Country: Russia
- Region: Vologda Oblast
- District: Sheksninsky District
- Time zone: UTC+3:00

Kameshnik (Russian: Камешник) is a rural locality (a village) and the administrative center of Kameshnikovskoye Rural Settlement, Sheksninsky District, Vologda Oblast, Russia. The population was 66 as of 2002.

== Geography ==
Kameshnik is located 55 km north of Sheksna (the district's administrative centre) by road. Kirgody is the nearest rural locality.
