= Makaryino, Sheksninsky District, Vologda Oblast =

Makaryino Макарьино
- Village
- Location within Vologda Oblast Location within Russia
- Coordinates: 59°05′N 38°32′E
- Country: Russia
- Region: Vologda Oblast
- District: Sheksninsky District
- Time zone: UTC+3:00

Makaryino (Russian: Макарьино) is a rural locality (a village) in Yurochenskoye Rural Settlement, Sheksninsky District, Vologda Oblast, Russia. The population was 8 as of 2002.

== Geography ==
Makaryino is located 22 km south of Sheksna (the district's administrative centre) by road. Sobolevo is the nearest rural locality.
