= Rebyachyevo =

Rebyachyevo Ребячьево
- Village
- Location within Vologda Oblast Location within Russia
- Coordinates: 59°08′N 38°53′E
- Country: Russia
- Region: Vologda Oblast
- District: Sheksninsky District
- Time zone: UTC+3:00

Rebyachyevo (Russian: Ребячьево) is a rural locality (a village) in Domshinskoye Rural Settlement, Sheksninsky District, Vologda Oblast, Russia. The population was 11 as of 2002.

== Geography ==
Rebyachyevo is located 31 km south of Sheksna (the district's administrative centre) by road. Orlovka is the nearest rural locality.
