= Kapustino, Sheksninsky District, Vologda Oblast =

Kapustino Капустино
- Village
- Location within Vologda Oblast Location within Russia
- Coordinates: 59°01′N 38°30′E
- Country: Russia
- Region: Vologda Oblast
- District: Sheksninsky District
- Time zone: UTC+3:00

Kapustino (Russian: Капустино) is a rural locality (a village) in Yurochenskoye Rural Settlement, Sheksninsky District, Vologda Oblast, Russia. The population was 2 as of 2002.

== Geography ==
Kapustino is located 36 km south of Sheksna (the district's administrative centre) by road. Machevo is the nearest rural locality.
