= Gorodskoye =

Gorodskoye Городское
- Village
- Location within Vologda Oblast Location within Russia
- Coordinates: 59°04′N 39°06′E
- Country: Russia
- Region: Vologda Oblast
- District: Sheksninsky District
- Time zone: UTC+3:00

Gorodskoye (Russian: Городское) is a rural locality (a village) in Domshinskoye Rural Settlement, Sheksninsky District, Vologda Oblast, Russia. The population was 2 as of 2002.

== Geography ==
Gorodskoye is located 47 km southeast of Sheksna (the district's administrative centre) by road. Zytsovo is the nearest rural locality.
