= Yershovo, Sheksninsky District, Vologda Oblast =

Yershovo Ершово
- Village
- Location within Vologda Oblast Location within Russia
- Coordinates: 59°21′N 38°24′E
- Country: Russia
- Region: Vologda Oblast
- District: Sheksninsky District
- Time zone: UTC+3:00

Yershovo (Russian: Ершово) is a rural locality (a village) and the administrative center of Yershovskoye Rural Settlement, Sheksninsky District, Vologda Oblast, Russia. The population was 246 as of 2002.

== Geography ==
Yershovo is located 25 km north of Sheksna (the district's administrative centre) by road. Pogorelka is the nearest rural locality.
