= Bolshaya Mushnya =

Bolshaya Mushnya Большая Мушня
- Village
- Location within Vologda Oblast Location within Russia
- Coordinates: 59°23′N 38°22′E
- Country: Russia
- Region: Vologda Oblast
- District: Sheksninsky District
- Time zone: UTC+3:00

Bolshaya Mushnya (Russian: Большая Мушня) is a rural locality (a village) in Yershovskoye Rural Settlement, Sheksninsky District, Vologda Oblast, Russia. The population was 9 as of 2002.

== Geography ==
Bolshaya Mushnya is located 27 km north of Sheksna (the district's administrative centre) by road. Malaya Mushnya is the nearest rural locality.
