= Yefimovo, Sheksninsky District, Vologda Oblast =

Yefimovo Ефимово
- Village
- Location within Vologda Oblast Location within Russia
- Coordinates: 59°00′N 39°01′E
- Country: Russia
- Region: Vologda Oblast
- District: Sheksninsky District
- Time zone: UTC+3:00

Yefimovo (Russian: Ефимово) is a rural locality (a village) in Fominskoye Rural Settlement, Sheksninsky District, Vologda Oblast, Russia. The population was 31 as of 2002.

== Geography ==
Yefimovo is located 47 km southeast of Sheksna (the district's administrative centre) by road. Vorontsovo is the nearest rural locality.
