= Bratkovo =

Bratkovo Братково
- Selo
- Location within Vologda Oblast Location within Russia
- Coordinates: 59°08′N 38°48′E
- Country: Russia
- Region: Vologda Oblast
- District: Sheksninsky District
- Time zone: UTC+3:00

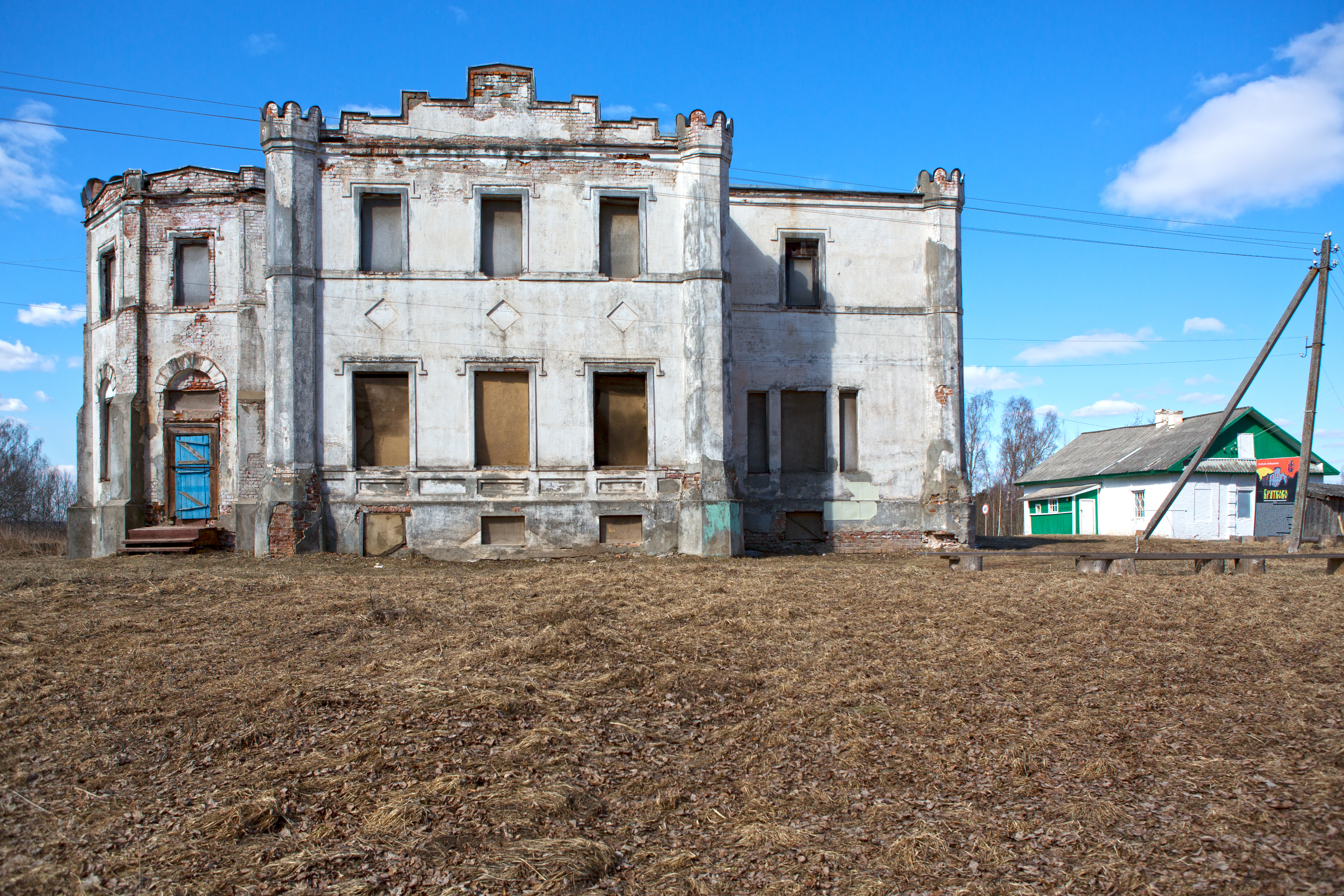

Bratkovo (Russian: Братково) is a rural locality (a selo) in Lyubomirovskoye Rural Settlement, Sheksninsky District, Vologda Oblast, Russia. The population was 91 as of 2002. There are 4 streets.

== Geography ==
Bratkovo is located 28 km (17 mi) southeast of Sheksna (the district's administrative centre) by road. Tsibino is the nearest rural locality.
