= Perkhino, Sheksninsky District, Vologda Oblast =

Perkhino Перхино
- Village
- Location within Vologda Oblast Location within Russia
- Coordinates: 59°14′N 38°35′E
- Country: Russia
- Region: Vologda Oblast
- District: Sheksninsky District
- Time zone: UTC+3:00

Perkhino (Russian: Перхино) is a rural locality (a village) in Churovskoye Rural Settlement, Sheksninsky District, Vologda Oblast, Russia. The population was 4 as of 2002.

== Geography ==
Perkhino is located 39 km northeast of Sheksna (the district's administrative centre) by road. Pestovo is the nearest rural locality.
