= Gushchino =

Gushchino Гущино
- Village
- Location within Vologda Oblast Location within Russia
- Coordinates: 59°19′N 38°40′E
- Country: Russia
- Region: Vologda Oblast
- District: Sheksninsky District
- Time zone: UTC+3:00

Gushchino (Russian: Гущино) is a rural locality (a village) in Sizemskoye Rural Settlement, Sheksninsky District, Vologda Oblast, Russia. The population was 3 as of 2002.

== Geography ==
Gushchino is located 53 km northeast of Sheksna (the district's administrative centre) by road. Rameshka is the nearest rural locality.
