= Pervino =

Pervino Первино
- Village
- Location within Vologda Oblast Location within Russia
- Coordinates: 59°07′N 38°50′E
- Country: Russia
- Region: Vologda Oblast
- District: Sheksninsky District
- Time zone: UTC+3:00

Pervino (Russian: Первино) is a rural locality (a village) in Lyubomirovskoye Rural Settlement, Sheksninsky District, Vologda Oblast, Russia. The population was 1 as of 2002.

== Geography ==
Pervino is located 31 km southeast of Sheksna (the district's administrative centre) by road. Bratkovo is the nearest rural locality.
