= Kameshnitsa =

Kameshnitsa Камешница
- Village
- Location within Vologda Oblast Location within Russia
- Coordinates: 59°30′N 38°28′E
- Country: Russia
- Region: Vologda Oblast
- District: Sheksninsky District
- Time zone: UTC+3:00

Kameshnitsa (Russian: Камешница) is a rural locality (a village) in Ramenskoye Rural Settlement, Sheksninsky District, Vologda Oblast, Russia. The population was 8 as of 2002.

== Geography ==
Kameshnitsa is located 46 km north of Sheksna (the district's administrative centre) by road. Novo is the nearest rural locality.
