= Bolshoye Mitenino =

Bolshoye Mitenino Большое Митенино
- Village
- Location within Vologda Oblast Location within Russia
- Coordinates: 59°11′N 38°32′E
- Country: Russia
- Region: Vologda Oblast
- District: Sheksninsky District
- Time zone: UTC+3:00

Bolshoye Mitenino (Russian: Большое Митенино) is a rural locality (a village) in Nikolskoye Rural Settlement, Sheksninsky District, Vologda Oblast, Russia. The population was 31 as of 2002.

== Geography ==
Bolshoye Mitenino is located three km east of Sheksna (the district's administrative centre) by road. Maloye Mitenino is the nearest rural locality.
