= Zolotukha, Vologda Oblast =

Zolotukha Золотуха
- Village
- Location within Vologda Oblast Location within Russia
- Coordinates: 59°30′N 38°31′E
- Country: Russia
- Region: Vologda Oblast
- District: Sheksninsky District
- Time zone: UTC+3:00

Zolotukha (Russian: Золотуха) is a rural locality (a village) in Ramenskoye Rural Settlement, Sheksninsky District, Vologda Oblast, Russia. The population was 17 as of 2002.

== Geography ==
Zolotukha is located 82 km north of Sheksna (the district's administrative centre) by road. Filyakovo is the nearest rural locality.
