= Alferovo, Sheksninsky District, Vologda Oblast =

Alferovo Алферово
- Village
- Location within Vologda Oblast Location within Russia
- Coordinates: 59°07′N 38°54′E
- Country: Russia
- Region: Vologda Oblast
- District: Sheksninsky District
- Time zone: UTC+3:00

Alferovo (Russian: Алферово) is a rural locality (a village) in Domshinskoye Rural Settlement, Sheksninsky District, Vologda Oblast, Russia. The population was 9 as of 2002.

== Geography ==
Alferovo is located 33 km (21 mi) southeast of Sheksna (the district's administrative centre) by road. Cherneyevo is the nearest rural locality.
