= Antipino, Sheksninsky District, Vologda Oblast =

Village in Russia

Coordinates: 59.1983°N 38.3361°E

Antipino (Антипино) is a village in Sheksninsky District of the Vologda Oblast.

It's part of the Zheleznodorozhnoye Selsovet (village council).

The village is 21 km (13 mi) by road from the district center Sheksna, and 3 km by road from the nearest municipal center Pacha. The nearest populated places are Pacha, Kichino, and Sobolino.

In 2002, the village had a population of 5.

== History ==
In 1866, Antipino consisted of 18 households, 44 men, and 62 women. There were some Spasov raskolniks.

In 1895, the Kazan Antipinskaya church (Казанская Антипинская церковь) was built in Antipino, and the village belonged to its parish thereafter. In 1912, the village of 34 lots with buildings, with 51 living quarters. There were 84 men and 94 women. Church land adjacent to the village had 3 buildings (including a school), 2 men and 4 women.
