= Churovskoye =

Churovskoye Чуровское
- Selo
- Location within Vologda Oblast Location within Russia
- Coordinates: 59°15′N 38°35′E
- Country: Russia
- Region: Vologda Oblast
- District: Sheksninsky District
- Time zone: UTC+3:00

Churovskoye (Russian: Чуровское) is a rural locality (a selo) and the administrative center of Churovskoye Rural Settlement, Sheksninsky District, Vologda Oblast, Russia. The population was 625 as of 2002.

== Geography ==
Churovskoye is located 44 km northeast of Sheksna (the district's administrative centre) by road. Uloshkovo is the nearest rural locality.
