= Razbuy =

Razbuy Разбуй
- Village
- Location within Vologda Oblast Location within Russia
- Coordinates: 59°16′N 38°37′E
- Country: Russia
- Region: Vologda Oblast
- District: Sheksninsky District
- Time zone: UTC+3:00

Razbuy (Russian: Разбуй) is a rural locality (a village) in Churovskoye Rural Settlement, Sheksninsky District, Vologda Oblast, Russia. The population was 7 as of 2002.

== Geography ==
Razbuy is located 13 km northeast of Sheksna (the district's administrative centre) by road. Uloshkovo is the nearest rural locality.
