= Nesterovo, Sheksninsky District, Vologda Oblast =

Nesterovo Нестерово
- Village
- Location within Vologda Oblast Location within Russia
- Coordinates: 59°07′N 39°00′E
- Country: Russia
- Region: Vologda Oblast
- District: Sheksninsky District
- Time zone: UTC+3:00

Nesterovo (Russian: Нестерово) is a rural locality (a village) and the administrative center of Domshinskoye Rural Settlement, Sheksninsky District, Vologda Oblast, Russia. The population was 87 as of 2002.

== Geography ==
Nesterovo is located 38 km southeast of Sheksna (the district's administrative centre) by road. Mititsyno is the nearest rural locality.
