= Mititsyno =

Mititsyno Митицыно
- Village
- Location within Vologda Oblast Location within Russia
- Coordinates: 59°06′N 38°59′E
- Country: Russia
- Region: Vologda Oblast
- District: Sheksninsky District
- Time zone: UTC+3:00

Mititsyno (Russian: Митицыно) is a rural locality (a village) in Domshinskoye Rural Settlement, Sheksninsky District, Vologda Oblast, Russia. The population was 164 as of 2002.

== Geography ==
Mititsyno is located 38 km southeast of Sheksna (the district's administrative centre) by road. Nesterovo is the nearest rural locality.
