= Koluberevo =

Koluberevo Колуберево
- Village
- Location within Vologda Oblast Location within Russia
- Coordinates: 59°24′N 38°37′E
- Country: Russia
- Region: Vologda Oblast
- District: Sheksninsky District
- Time zone: UTC+3:00

Koluberevo (Russian: Колуберево) is a rural locality (a village) in Sizemskoye Rural Settlement, Sheksninsky District, Vologda Oblast, Russia. The population was 12 as of 2002.

== Geography ==
Koluberevo is located 60 km north of Sheksna (the district's administrative centre) by road. Saunino is the nearest rural locality.
