= Demsino =

Demsino Демсино
- Village
- Location within Vologda Oblast Location within Russia
- Coordinates: 59°13′N 38°37′E
- Country: Russia
- Region: Vologda Oblast
- District: Sheksninsky District
- Time zone: UTC+3:00

Demsino (Russian: Демсино) is a rural locality (a village) in Churovskoye Rural Settlement, Sheksninsky District, Vologda Oblast, Russia. The population was 87 as of 2002.

== Geography ==
Demsino is located 10.5 km east of Sheksna (the district's administrative centre) by road and 391 km north of Moscow, the country's capital. Slizovo is the nearest rural locality.
