= Kochino =

Kochino Кочино
- Village
- Location within Vologda Oblast Location within Russia
- Coordinates: 59°11′N 38°26′E
- Country: Russia
- Region: Vologda Oblast
- District: Sheksninsky District
- Time zone: UTC+3:00

Kochino (Russian: Кочино) is a rural locality (a village) in Nifantovskoye Rural Settlement, Sheksninsky District, Vologda Oblast, Russia. The population was 6 as of 2002.

== Geography ==
Kochino is located 9 km southwest of Sheksna (the district's administrative centre) by road. Tarkanovo is the nearest rural locality.
