= Bolshoy Ovinets =

Bolshoy Ovinets Большой Овинец
- Village
- Location within Vologda Oblast Location within Russia
- Coordinates: 59°24′N 38°40′E
- Country: Russia
- Region: Vologda Oblast
- District: Sheksninsky District
- Time zone: UTC+3:00

Bolshoy Ovinets (Russian: Большой Овинец) is a rural locality (a village) in Sizemskoye Rural Settlement, Sheksninsky District, Vologda Oblast, Russia. The population was 7 as of 2002.

== Geography ==
Bolshoy Ovinets is located 61 km north of Sheksna (the district's administrative centre) by road. Kiselyovo is the nearest rural locality.
