= Kurovo, Sheksninsky District, Vologda Oblast =

Kurovo Курово
- Village
- Location within Vologda Oblast Location within Russia
- Coordinates: 59°11′N 38°15′E
- Country: Russia
- Region: Vologda Oblast
- District: Sheksninsky District
- Time zone: UTC+3:00

Kurovo (Russian: Курово) is a rural locality (a village) in Zheleznodorozhnoye Rural Settlement, Sheksninsky District, Vologda Oblast, Russia. The population was 1 as of 2002.

== Geography ==
Kurovo is located 19 km west of Sheksna (the district's administrative centre) by road. Sokolovo is the nearest rural locality.
