= Sızma, Vologda Oblast =

Sızma Сизьма
- Selo
- Location within Vologda Oblast Location within Russia
- Coordinates: 59°24′N 38°42′E
- Country: Russia
- Region: Vologda Oblast
- District: Sheksninsky District
- Time zone: UTC+3:00

Sızma (Russian: Сизьма) is a rural locality (a selo) in Sizemskoye Rural Settlement, Sheksninsky District, Vologda Oblast, Russia. The population was 233 as of 2002. There are 5 streets.

== Geography ==
Sızma is located 63 km north of Sheksna (the district's administrative centre) by road. Zverinets is the nearest rural locality.
