= Pankino =

Pankino Панькино
- Village
- Location within Vologda Oblast Location within Russia
- Coordinates: 59°14′N 38°43′E
- Country: Russia
- Region: Vologda Oblast
- District: Sheksninsky District
- Time zone: UTC+3:00

Pankino (Russian: Панькино) is a rural locality (a village) in Chyobsarskoye Urban Settlement, Sheksninsky District, Vologda Oblast, Russia. The population was 2 as of 2002.

== Geography ==
Pankino is located 39 km east of Sheksna (the district's administrative centre) by road. Gerasimovo is the nearest rural locality.
