= Zverinets, Vologda Oblast =

Zverinets Зверинец
- Village
- Location within Vologda Oblast Location within Russia
- Coordinates: 59°25′N 38°41′E
- Country: Russia
- Region: Vologda Oblast
- District: Sheksninsky District
- Time zone: UTC+3:00

Zverinets (Russian: Зверинец) is a rural locality (a village) in Sizemskoye Rural Settlement, Sheksninsky District, Vologda Oblast, Russia. The population was 11 as of 2002.

== Geography ==
Zverinets is located 63 km north of Sheksna (the district's administrative centre) by road. Malyino is the nearest rural locality.
