= Maly Ovinets =

Maly Ovinets Малый Овинец
- Village
- Location within Vologda Oblast Location within Russia
- Coordinates: 59°23′N 38°41′E
- Country: Russia
- Region: Vologda Oblast
- District: Sheksninsky District
- Time zone: UTC+3:00

Maly Ovinets (Russian: Малый Овинец) is a rural locality (a village) in Sizemskoye Rural Settlement, Sheksninsky District, Vologda Oblast, Russia. The population was 24 as of 2002.

== Geography ==
Maly Ovinets is located 66 km north of Sheksna (the district's administrative centre) by road. Polyana is the nearest rural locality.
