= Nokshino, Sheksninsky District, Vologda Oblast =

Nokshino Нокшино
- Village
- Location within Vologda Oblast Location within Russia
- Coordinates: 59°03′N 38°41′E
- Country: Russia
- Region: Vologda Oblast
- District: Sheksninsky District
- Time zone: UTC+3:00

Nokshino (Russian: Нокшино) is a rural locality (a village) in Lyubomirovskoye Rural Settlement, Sheksninsky District, Vologda Oblast, Russia. The population was 5 as of 2002.

== Geography ==
Nokshino is located 30 km southeast of Sheksna (the district's administrative centre) by road. Dumino is the nearest rural locality.
