= Loginovo, Sheksninsky District, Vologda Oblast =

Loginovo Логиново
- Village
- Location within Vologda Oblast Location within Russia
- Coordinates: 59°20′N 38°23′E
- Country: Russia
- Region: Vologda Oblast
- District: Sheksninsky District
- Time zone: UTC+3:00

Loginovo (Russian: Логиново) is a rural locality (a village) in Yershovskoye Rural Settlement, Sheksninsky District, Vologda Oblast, Russia. The population was 8 as of 2002.

== Geography ==
Loginovo is located 20 km north of Sheksna (the district's administrative centre) by road. Afanasovo is the nearest rural locality.
