= Bekarevo =

Bekarevo Бекарево
- Village
- Location within Vologda Oblast Location within Russia
- Coordinates: 59°02′N 38°27′E
- Country: Russia
- Region: Vologda Oblast
- District: Sheksninsky District
- Time zone: UTC+3:00

Bekarevo (Russian: Бекарево) is a rural locality (a village) in Yurochenskoye Rural Settlement, Sheksninsky District, Vologda Oblast, Russia. The population was 13 as of 2002.

== Geography ==
Bekarevo is located 38 km south of Sheksna (the district's administrative centre) by road. Kuzminskoye is the nearest rural locality.
