= Demenskoye =

Demenskoye Деменское
- Village
- Location within Vologda Oblast Location within Russia
- Coordinates: 59°11′N 38°28′E
- Country: Russia
- Region: Vologda Oblast
- District: Sheksninsky District
- Time zone: UTC+3:00

Demenskoye (Russian: Деменское) is a rural locality (a village) in Nikolskoye Rural Settlement, Sheksninsky District, Vologda Oblast, Russia. The population was 21 as of 2002.

== Geography ==
Demenskoye is located 3 km southwest of Sheksna (the district's administrative centre) by road. Progress is the nearest rural locality.
