= Vorkop =

Vorkop Воркопь
- Village
- Location within Vologda Oblast Location within Russia
- Coordinates: 59°21′N 38°25′E
- Country: Russia
- Region: Vologda Oblast
- District: Sheksninsky District
- Time zone: UTC+3:00

Vorkop (Russian: Воркопь) is a rural locality (a village) in Yershovskoye Rural Settlement, Sheksninsky District, Vologda Oblast, Russia. The population was 20 as of 2002.

== Geography ==
Vorkop is located 26 km north of Sheksna (the district's administrative centre) by road. Pogorelka is the nearest rural locality.
