= Gramotino =

Gramotino Грамотино
- Village
- Location within Vologda Oblast Location within Russia
- Coordinates: 59°06′N 38°34′E
- Country: Russia
- Region: Vologda Oblast
- District: Sheksninsky District
- Time zone: UTC+3:00

Gramotino (Russian: Грамотино) is a rural locality (a village) in Ugolskoye Rural Settlement, Sheksninsky District, Vologda Oblast, Russia. The population was 6 as of 2002.

== Geography ==
Gramotino is located 18 km south of Sheksna (the district's administrative centre) by road. Kovshovo is the nearest rural locality.
