= Aristovo, Sheksninsky District, Vologda Oblast =

Aristovo Аристово
- Village
- Location within Vologda Oblast Location within Russia
- Coordinates: 59°29′N 38°29′E
- Country: Russia
- Region: Vologda Oblast
- District: Sheksninsky District
- Time zone: UTC+3:00

Aristovo (Russian: Аристово) is a rural locality (a village) in Ramenskoye Rural Settlement, Sheksninsky District, Vologda Oblast, Russia. The population was 39 as of 2002.

== Geography ==
Aristovo is located 43 km (27 mi) north of Sheksna (the district's administrative centre) by road. Ramenye is the nearest rural locality.
