= Zhayno =

Zhayno Жайно
- Village
- Location within Vologda Oblast Location within Russia
- Coordinates: 59°11′N 38°41′E
- Country: Russia
- Region: Vologda Oblast
- District: Sheksninsky District
- Time zone: UTC+3:00

Zhayno (Russian: Жайно) is a rural locality (a village) in Chyobsarskoye Urban Settlement, Sheksninsky District, Vologda Oblast, Russia. The population was 4 as of 2002.

== Geography ==
Zhayno is located 32 km east of Sheksna (the district's administrative centre) by road. Churilovo is the nearest rural locality.
