= Levinskaya, Sheksninsky District, Vologda Oblast =

Levinskaya Левинская
- Village
- Location within Vologda Oblast Location within Russia
- Coordinates: 59°29′N 38°30′E
- Country: Russia
- Region: Vologda Oblast
- District: Sheksninsky District
- Time zone: UTC+3:00

Levinskaya (Russian: Левинская) is a rural locality (a village) in Ramenskoye Rural Settlement, Sheksninsky District, Vologda Oblast, Russia. The population was 40 as of 2002.

== Geography ==
Levinskaya is located 49 km north of Sheksna (the district's administrative centre) by road. Bolshaya Stepanovskaya is the nearest rural locality.
