= Nefedkovo =

Nefedkovo Нефедково
- Village
- Location within Vologda Oblast Location within Russia
- Coordinates: 59°12′N 38°45′E
- Country: Russia
- Region: Vologda Oblast
- District: Sheksninsky District
- Time zone: UTC+3:00

Nefedkovo (Russian: Нефедково) is a rural locality (a village) in Chyobsarskoye Urban Settlement, Sheksninsky District, Vologda Oblast, Russia. The population was 1 as of 2002.

== Geography ==
Nefedkovo is located 34 km east of Sheksna (the district's administrative centre) by road. Gorka is the nearest rural locality.
