= Nizkiye =

Nizkiye Низкие
- Village
- Location within Vologda Oblast Location within Russia
- Coordinates: 59°07′N 38°41′E
- Country: Russia
- Region: Vologda Oblast
- District: Sheksninsky District
- Time zone: UTC+3:00

Nizkiye (Russian: Низкие) is a rural locality (a village) in Ugolskoye Rural Settlement, Sheksninsky District, Vologda Oblast, Russia. The population was at 9 as of 2002.

== Geography ==
Nizkiye is located 19 km southeast of Sheksna (the district's administrative centre) by road. Savinskoye is the nearest rural locality.
