= Kichino =

Kichino Кичино
- Village
- Location within Vologda Oblast Location within Russia
- Coordinates: 59°11′N 38°21′E
- Country: Russia
- Region: Vologda Oblast
- District: Sheksninsky District
- Time zone: UTC+3:00

Kichino (Russian: Кичино) is a rural locality (a village) in Zheleznodorozhnoye Rural Settlement, Sheksninsky District, Vologda Oblast, Russia. The population was 30 as of 2002.

== Geography ==
Kichino is located 12 km west of Sheksna (the district's administrative centre) by road. Antipino is the nearest rural locality.
