= Machevo =

Machevo Мачево
- Village
- Location within Vologda Oblast Location within Russia
- Coordinates: 59°00′N 38°31′E
- Country: Russia
- Region: Vologda Oblast
- District: Sheksninsky District
- Time zone: UTC+3:00

Machevo (Russian: Мачево) is a rural locality (a village) in Yurochenskoye Rural Settlement, Sheksninsky District, Vologda Oblast, Russia. The population was 21 as of 2002.

== Geography ==
Machevo is located 37 km south of Sheksna (the district's administrative centre) by road. Glyadkovo is the nearest rural locality.
