= Khoroshevo, Sheksninsky District, Vologda Oblast =

Khoroshevo Хорошево
- Village
- Location within Vologda Oblast Location within Russia
- Coordinates: 59°20′N 38°31′E
- Country: Russia
- Region: Vologda Oblast
- District: Sheksninsky District
- Time zone: UTC+3:00

Khoroshevo (Russian: Хорошево) is a rural locality (a village) in Sizemskoye Rural Settlement, Sheksninsky District, Vologda Oblast, Russia. The population was 4 as of 2002.

== Geography ==
Khoroshevo is located 30 km north of Sheksna (the district's administrative centre) by road. Florida is the nearest rural locality.
