= Khodyrevo =

Khodyrevo Ходырево
- Village
- Location within Vologda Oblast Location within Russia
- Coordinates: 59°06′N 38°48′E
- Country: Russia
- Region: Vologda Oblast
- District: Sheksninsky District
- Time zone: UTC+3:00

Khodyrevo (Russian: Ходырево) is a rural locality (a village) in Lyubomirovskoye Rural Settlement, Sheksninsky District, Vologda Oblast, Russia. The population was 4 as of 2002.

== Geography ==
Khodyrevo is located 35 km southeast of Sheksna (the district's administrative centre) by road. Boryatino is the nearest rural locality.
