= Pyzheyevo =

Pyzheyevo Пыжеево
- Village
- Location within Vologda Oblast Location within Russia
- Coordinates: 59°22′N 38°31′E
- Country: Russia
- Region: Vologda Oblast
- District: Sheksninsky District
- Time zone: UTC+3:00

Pyzheyevo (Russian: Пыжеево) is a rural locality (a village) in Sizemskoye Rural Settlement, Sheksninsky District, Vologda Oblast, Russia. The population was 22 as of 2002.

== Geography ==
Pyzheyevo is located 65 km north of Sheksna (the district's administrative centre) by road. Florida is the nearest rural locality.
