= Sologost =

Sologost Сологость
- Village
- Location within Vologda Oblast Location within Russia
- Coordinates: 59°21′N 38°16′E
- Country: Russia
- Region: Vologda Oblast
- District: Sheksninsky District
- Time zone: UTC+3:00

Sologost (Russian: Сологость) is a rural locality (a village) in Yershovskoye Rural Settlement, Sheksninsky District, Vologda Oblast, Russia. The population was 7 as of 2002.

== Geography ==
Sologost is located 32 km northwest of Sheksna (the district's administrative centre) by road. Sosnovka is the nearest rural locality.
