= Troshino, Sheksninsky District, Vologda Oblast =

Troshino Трошино
- Village
- Location within Vologda Oblast Location within Russia
- Coordinates: 59°17′N 38°39′E
- Country: Russia
- Region: Vologda Oblast
- District: Sheksninsky District
- Time zone: UTC+3:00

Troshino (Russian: Трошино) is a rural locality (a village) in Sizemskoye Rural Settlement, Sheksninsky District, Vologda Oblast, Russia. The population was 5 as of 2002.

== Geography ==
Troshino is located 52 km northeast of Sheksna (the district's administrative centre) by road. Samsonitsa is the nearest rural locality.
