= Gvozdevo =

Gvozdevo Гвоздево
- Village
- Location within Vologda Oblast Location within Russia
- Coordinates: 58°58′N 39°06′E
- Country: Russia
- Region: Vologda Oblast
- District: Sheksninsky District
- Time zone: UTC+3:00

Gvozdevo (Russian: Гвоздево) is a rural locality (a village) in Fominskoye Rural Settlement, Sheksninsky District, Vologda Oblast, Russia. The population was 29 as of 2002.

== Geography ==
Gvozdevo is located 53 km southeast of Sheksna (the district's administrative centre) by road. Aksyonovo is the nearest rural locality.
