= Dubki, Vologda Oblast =

Dubki Дубки
- Village
- Location within Vologda Oblast Location within Russia
- Coordinates: 59°25′N 38°43′E
- Country: Russia
- Region: Vologda Oblast
- District: Sheksninsky District
- Time zone: UTC+3:00

Dubki (Russian: Дубки) is a rural locality (a village) in Sizemskoye Rural Settlement, Sheksninsky District, Vologda Oblast, Russia. The population was 35 as of 2010.

== Geography ==
Dubki is located 64 km northeast of Sheksna (the district's administrative centre) by road. Sizma is the nearest rural locality.
