= Dyakonovskoye =

Dyakonovskoye Дьяконовское
- Village
- Location within Vologda Oblast Location within Russia
- Coordinates: 59°15′N 38°24′E
- Country: Russia
- Region: Vologda Oblast
- District: Sheksninsky District
- Time zone: UTC+3:00

Dyakonovskoye (Russian: Дьяконовское) is a rural locality (a village) in Nifantovskoye Rural Settlement, Sheksninsky District, Vologda Oblast, Russia. The population was 38 as of 2002. There are 2 streets.

== Geography ==
Dyakonovskoye is located 11 km northwest of Sheksna (the district's administrative centre) by road. Ivankovo is the nearest rural locality.
