= Mineyka, Sheksninsky District, Vologda Oblast =

Mineyka Минейка
- Village
- Location within Vologda Oblast Location within Russia
- Coordinates: 59°09′N 38°52′E
- Country: Russia
- Region: Vologda Oblast
- District: Sheksninsky District
- Time zone: UTC+3:00

Mineyka (Russian: Минейка) is a rural locality (a village) in Domshinskoye Rural Settlement, Sheksninsky District, Vologda Oblast, Russia. The population was 3023 as of 2020.

== Geography ==
Mineyka is located 32 km southeast of Sheksna (the district's administrative centre) by road. Orlovka is the nearest rural locality.
