= Yeremino, Sheksninsky District, Vologda Oblast =

Yeremino Еремино
- Village
- Location within Vologda Oblast Location within Russia
- Coordinates: 59°25′N 38°46′E
- Country: Russia
- Region: Vologda Oblast
- District: Sheksninsky District
- Time zone: UTC+3:00

Yeremino (Russian: Еремино) is a rural locality (a village) in Sizemskoye Rural Settlement, Sheksninsky District, Vologda Oblast, Russia. The population was 11 as of 2002.

== Geography ==
Yeremino is located 67 km northeast of Sheksna (the district's administrative centre) by road. Kuzminskoye is the nearest rural locality.
