= Lyutchik =

Lyutchik Лютчик
- Village
- Location within Vologda Oblast Location within Russia
- Coordinates: 59°13′N 38°32′E
- Country: Russia
- Region: Vologda Oblast
- District: Sheksninsky District
- Time zone: UTC+3:00

Lyutchik (Russian: Лютчик) is a rural locality (a village) in Nikolskoye Rural Settlement, Sheksninsky District, Vologda Oblast, Russia. The population was 18 as of 2002.

== Geography ==
Lyutchik is located 7 km northeast of Sheksna (the district's administrative centre) by road. Sheksna is the nearest rural locality.
