= Molodki =

Molodki Молодки
- Village
- Location within Vologda Oblast Location within Russia
- Coordinates: 59°10′N 38°47′E
- Country: Russia
- Region: Vologda Oblast
- District: Sheksninsky District
- Time zone: UTC+3:00

Molodki (Russian: Молодки) is a rural locality (a village) in Chyobsarskoye Urban Settlement, Sheksninsky District, Vologda Oblast, Russia. The population was 17 as of 2002.

== Geography ==
Molodki is located 25 km east of Sheksna (the district's administrative centre) by road. Slavyanka is the nearest rural locality.
