= Chyobsara =

Chyobsara Чёбсара
- Urban-type settlement
- Interactive map of Chyobsara
- Location of Chyobsara Chyobsara (Vologda Oblast)
- Coordinates: 59°12′N 38°50′E
- Country: Russia
- Federal subject: Vologda Oblast
- Administrative district: Sheksninsky District
- Founded: 1898
- Urban-type settlement status since: 1931

Population (2010 Census)
  - Total: 1,440
  - Estimate (2012): 1,400 (−2.8%)

Municipal status
  - Municipal district: Sheksninsky Municipal District
  - Urban settlement: Chyobsarskoye Urban Settlement
  - Capital of: Chyobsarskoye Urban Settlement
- Time zone: UTC+3 (MSK)
- Postal code: 162580
- OKTMO ID: 19658162051

Chyobsara (Russian: Чёбсара) is an urban locality (an urban-type settlement) in Sheksninsky District of Vologda Oblast, Russia, located 73 kilometers (45 mi) from Vologda. Municipally, it is incorporated as Chyobsarskoye Urban Settlement, one of the two urban settlements in the district. Population: 1,440 (2010 census); 1,776 (2002 census); 2,732 (1989 Soviet census).

== History ==
The settlement was founded as a railway station in 1898. At the moment, it was located in Vologodsky Uyezd of Vologda Governorate. On July 15, 1929, several governorates, including Vologda Governorate, were merged into Northern Krai, and the uyezds were abolished. Instead, Chyobsarsky District with the administrative center in the railway station of Chyobsara was established as part of Vologda Okrug. In 1931, Chyobsara was granted the status of an urban-type settlement.

In 1936, Northern Krai was transformed into Northern Oblast. In 1937, Northern Oblast was split into Arkhangelsk Oblast and Vologda Oblast. Chyobsarsky District remained in Vologda Oblast.

On December 13, 1962 Chyobsarsky District was abolished. Its area was split between Vologodsky and Cherepovetsky Districts. This was a part of later aborted Khrushchyov administrative reform. On January 12, 1965 Chyobsara became a part of newly established Sheksninsky District with the administrative center in Sheksna.

== Economy ==
=== Industry ===
In Chyobsara, there are several enterprises of timber industry.

=== Transportation ===
Chyobsara is connected by a local road with A114 highway. The highway connects Vologda with Cherepovets and Saint Petersburg.

In Chyobsara, there is a railway station on the railroad connecting Vologda with Cherepovets and Saint Petersburg.
