= Gubino, Sheksninsky District, Vologda Oblast =

Gubino Губино
- Village
- Location within Vologda Oblast Location within Russia
- Coordinates: 59°08′N 39°04′E
- Country: Russia
- Region: Vologda Oblast
- District: Sheksninsky District
- Time zone: UTC+3:00

Gubino (Russian: Губино) is a rural locality (a village) in Domshinskoye Rural Settlement, Sheksninsky District, Vologda Oblast, Russia. The population was 7 as of 2002.

== Geography ==
Gubino is located 44 km east of Sheksna (the district's administrative centre) by road. Volkovo is the nearest rural locality.
