= Dudkino, Sheksninsky District, Vologda Oblast =

Dudkino Дудкино
- Village
- Location within Vologda Oblast Location within Russia
- Coordinates: 59°13′N 38°45′E
- Country: Russia
- Region: Vologda Oblast
- District: Sheksninsky District
- Time zone: UTC+3:00

Dudkino (Russian: Дудкино) is a rural locality (a village) in Chyobsarskoye Urban Settlement, Sheksninsky District, Vologda Oblast, Russia. The population was 3 as of 2002.

== Geography ==
Dudkino is located 35 km east of Sheksna (the district's administrative centre) by road. Gorka is the nearest rural locality.
