= Bratovets =

Bratovets Братовец
- Village
- Location within Vologda Oblast Location within Russia
- Coordinates: 59°10′N 38°28′E
- Country: Russia
- Region: Vologda Oblast
- District: Sheksninsky District
- Time zone: UTC+3:00

Bratovets (Russian: Братовец) is a rural locality (a village) in Nikolskoye Rural Settlement, Sheksninsky District, Vologda Oblast, Russia. The population was 32 as of 2002.

== Geography ==
Bratovets is located 3 km southwest of Sheksna (the district's administrative centre) by road. Chagino is the nearest rural locality.
