= Gologuzka =

Gologuzka Гологузка
- Village
- Location within Vologda Oblast Location within Russia
- Coordinates: 59°17′N 38°33′E
- Country: Russia
- Region: Vologda Oblast
- District: Sheksninsky District
- Time zone: UTC+3:00

Gologuzka (Russian: Гологузка) is a rural locality (a village) in Churovskoye Rural Settlement, Sheksninsky District, Vologda Oblast, Russia. The population was 1 as of 2002.

== Geography ==
Gologuzka is located 50 km north of Sheksna (the district's administrative centre) by road. Myshkino is the nearest rural locality.
