= Ankimarovo =

Ankimarovo Анкимарово
- Village
- Location within Vologda Oblast Location within Russia
- Coordinates: 59°26′N 38°28′E
- Country: Russia
- Region: Vologda Oblast
- District: Sheksninsky District
- Time zone: UTC+3:00

Ankimarovo (Russian: Анкимарово) is a rural locality (a village) in Ramenskoye Rural Settlement, Sheksninsky District, Vologda Oblast, Russia. The population was 2 as of 2002.

== Geography ==
Ankimarovo is located 74 km (46 mi) north of Sheksna (the district's administrative centre) by road. Bolshoy Dvor is the nearest rural locality.
