= Lupanda =

Lupanda Лупанда
- Village
- Location within Vologda Oblast Location within Russia
- Coordinates: 59°05′N 38°58′E
- Country: Russia
- Region: Vologda Oblast
- District: Sheksninsky District
- Time zone: UTC+3:00

Lupanda (Russian: Лупанда) is a rural locality (a village) in Domshinskoye Rural Settlement, Sheksninsky District, Vologda Oblast, Russia. The population was 2 as of 2002.

== Geography ==
Lupanda is located 42 km southeast of Sheksna (the district's administrative centre) by road. Dor is the nearest rural locality.
