= Rylovo, Sheksninsky District, Vologda Oblast =

Rylovo Рылово
- Village
- Location within Vologda Oblast Location within Russia
- Coordinates: 59°09′N 38°35′E
- Country: Russia
- Region: Vologda Oblast
- District: Sheksninsky District
- Time zone: UTC+3:00

Rylovo (Russian: Рылово) is a rural locality (a village) in Ugolskoye Rural Settlement, Sheksninsky District, Vologda Oblast, Russia. The population was 7 as of 2002. There are 3 streets.

== Geography ==
Rylovo is located 9 km southeast of Sheksna (the district's administrative centre) by road. Bylino is the nearest rural locality.
