= Zadnyaya, Sheksninsky District, Vologda Oblast =

Zadnyaya Задняя
- Village
- Location within Vologda Oblast Location within Russia
- Coordinates: 59°31′N 38°19′E
- Country: Russia
- Region: Vologda Oblast
- District: Sheksninsky District
- Time zone: UTC+3:00

Zadnyaya (Russian: Задняя) is a rural locality (a village) in Kameshnikovskoye Rural Settlement, Sheksninsky District, Vologda Oblast, Russia. The population was 17 as of 2002.

== Geography ==
Zadnyaya is located 59 km north of Sheksna (the district's administrative centre) by road. Kalikino is the nearest rural locality.
