= Leushkino, Sheksninsky District, Vologda Oblast =

Leushkino Леушкино
- Village
- Location within Vologda Oblast Location within Russia
- Coordinates: 59°06′N 39°01′E
- Country: Russia
- Region: Vologda Oblast
- District: Sheksninsky District
- Time zone: UTC+3:00

Leushkino (Russian: Леушкино) is a rural locality (a village) in Domshinskoye Rural Settlement, Sheksninsky District, Vologda Oblast, Russia. The population was 6 as of 2002.

== Geography ==
Leushkino is located 40 km southeast of Sheksna (the district's administrative centre) by road. Globena is the nearest rural locality.
