= Myshkino, Sheksninsky District, Vologda Oblast =

Myshkino Мышкино
- Village
- Location within Vologda Oblast Location within Russia
- Coordinates: 59°17′N 38°32′E
- Country: Russia
- Region: Vologda Oblast
- District: Sheksninsky District
- Time zone: UTC+3:00

Myshkino (Russian: Мышкино) is a rural locality (a village) in Churovskoye Rural Settlement, Sheksninsky District, Vologda Oblast, Russia. The population was 3 as of 2002.

== Geography ==
Myshkino is located 52 km north of Sheksna (the district's administrative centre) by road. Beregovoy is the nearest rural locality.
