= Syromyatkino =

Syromyatkino Сыромяткино
- Village
- Location within Vologda Oblast Location within Russia
- Coordinates: 59°25′N 38°47′E
- Country: Russia
- Region: Vologda Oblast
- District: Sheksninsky District
- Time zone: UTC+3:00

Syromyatkino (Russian: Сыромяткино) is a rural locality (a village) in Sizemskoye Rural Settlement, Sheksninsky District, Vologda Oblast, Russia. The population was 27 as of 2002.

== Geography ==
Syromyatkino is located 69 km north of Sheksna (the district's administrative centre) by road. Pochinok is the nearest rural locality.
