= Starovo, Sheksninsky District, Vologda Oblast =

Starovo Старово
- Village
- Location within Vologda Oblast Location within Russia
- Coordinates: 59°14′N 38°35′E
- Country: Russia
- Region: Vologda Oblast
- District: Sheksninsky District
- Time zone: UTC+3:00

Starovo (Russian: Старово) is a rural locality (a village) in Churovskoye Rural Settlement, Sheksninsky District, Vologda Oblast, Russia. The population was 10 as of 2002.

== Geography ==
Starovo is located 42 km northeast of Sheksna (the district's administrative centre) by road. Borisovo is the nearest rural locality.
