= Spitsy =

Spitsy Спицы
- Village
- Location within Vologda Oblast Location within Russia
- Coordinates: 59°04′N 38°55′E
- Country: Russia
- Region: Vologda Oblast
- District: Sheksninsky District
- Time zone: UTC+3:00

Spitsy (Russian: Спицы) is a rural locality (a village) in Domshinskoye Rural Settlement, Sheksninsky District, Vologda Oblast, Russia. The population was 28 as of 2002.

== Geography ==
Spitsy is located 44 km southeast of Sheksna (the district's administrative centre) by road. Katayevo is the nearest rural locality.
