= Roshcha, Vologda Oblast =

Roshcha Роща
- Passing loop
- Location within Vologda Oblast Location within Russia
- Coordinates: 59°12′N 38°40′E
- Country: Russia
- Region: Vologda Oblast
- District: Sheksninsky District
- Time zone: UTC+3:00

Roshcha (Russian: Роща) is a rural locality (a passing loop) in Churovskoye Rural Settlement, Sheksninsky District, Vologda Oblast, Russia. The population was 5 in 2002.

== Geography ==
Roshcha is located 13 km east of Sheksna (the district's administrative centre) by road. Zhayno is the nearest rural locality.
