= Boyarovo =

Boyarovo Боярово
- Village
- Location within Vologda Oblast Location within Russia
- Coordinates: 59°04′N 38°53′E
- Country: Russia
- Region: Vologda Oblast
- District: Sheksninsky District
- Time zone: UTC+3:00

Boyarovo (Russian: Боярово) is a rural locality (a village) in Domshinskoye Rural Settlement, Sheksninsky District, Vologda Oblast, Russia. The population was 1 as of 2002.

== Geography ==
Boyarovo is located 39 km southeast of Sheksna (the district's administrative centre) by road. Davydovo is the nearest rural locality.
