= Kirgody =

Kirgody Киргоды
- Village
- Location within Vologda Oblast Location within Russia
- Coordinates: 59°34′N 38°22′E
- Country: Russia
- Region: Vologda Oblast
- District: Sheksninsky District
- Time zone: UTC+3:00

Kirgody (Russian: Киргоды) is a rural locality (a village) in Kameshnikovskoye Rural Settlement, Sheksninsky District, Vologda Oblast, Russia. The population was 93 as of 2002.

== Geography ==
Kirgody is located 57 km north of Sheksna (the district's administrative centre) by road. Kameshnik is the nearest rural locality.
