= Pashnets =

Pashnets Пашнец
- Village
- Location within Vologda Oblast Location within Russia
- Coordinates: 59°14′N 38°17′E
- Country: Russia
- Region: Vologda Oblast
- District: Sheksninsky District
- Time zone: UTC+3:00

Pashnets (Russian: Пашнец) is a rural locality (a village) in Zheleznodorozhnoye Rural Settlement, Sheksninsky District, Vologda Oblast, Russia. The population was 7 as of 2002.

== Geography ==
Pashnets is located 23 km northwest of Sheksna (the district's administrative centre) by road. Berendyukha is the nearest rural locality.
