= Gavrilovo, Sheksninsky District, Vologda Oblast =

Gavrilovo Гаврилово
- Village
- Location within Vologda Oblast Location within Russia
- Coordinates: 59°18′N 38°35′E
- Country: Russia
- Region: Vologda Oblast
- District: Sheksninsky District
- Time zone: UTC+3:00

Gavrilovo (Russian: Гаврилово) is a rural locality (a village) in Sizemskoye Rural Settlement, Sheksninsky District, Vologda Oblast, Russia. The population was 1 as of 2002.

== Geography ==
Gavrilovo is located 49 km northeast of Sheksna (the district's administrative centre) by road. Aksenovo is the nearest rural locality.
