= Prokino, Sheksninsky District, Vologda Oblast =

Prokino Прокино
- Village
- Location within Vologda Oblast Location within Russia
- Coordinates: 59°02′N 38°31′E
- Country: Russia
- Region: Vologda Oblast
- District: Sheksninsky District
- Time zone: UTC+3:00

Prokino (Russian: Прокино) is a rural locality (a village) in Yurochenskoye Rural Settlement, Sheksninsky District, Vologda Oblast, Russia. The population was 6 as of 2002.

== Geography ==
Prokino is located 33 km south of Sheksna (the district's administrative centre) by road. Yurochkino is the nearest rural locality.
