= Syamichi =

Syamichi Сямичи
- Village
- Location within Vologda Oblast Location within Russia
- Coordinates: 59°16′N 38°23′E
- Country: Russia
- Region: Vologda Oblast
- District: Sheksninsky District
- Time zone: UTC+3:00

Syamichi (Russian: Сямичи) is a rural locality (a village) in Nifantovskoye Rural Settlement, Sheksninsky District, Vologda Oblast, Russia. The population was 20 as of 2002. There are 3 streets.

== Geography ==
Syamichi is located 14 km northwest of Sheksna (the district's administrative centre) by road. Ivankovo is the nearest rural locality.
