= Vaneyevo, Sheksninsky District, Vologda Oblast =

Vaneyevo Ванеево
- Village
- Location within Vologda Oblast Location within Russia
- Coordinates: 59°06′N 38°26′E
- Country: Russia
- Region: Vologda Oblast
- District: Sheksninsky District
- Time zone: UTC+3:00

Vaneyevo (Russian: Ванеево) is a rural locality (a village) in Nikolskoye Rural Settlement, Sheksninsky District, Vologda Oblast, Russia. The population was 5 as of 2002.

== Geography ==
Vaneyevo is located 13 km south of Sheksna (the district's administrative centre) by road. Poteryayevo is the nearest rural locality.
