= Andryushino, Sheksninsky District, Vologda Oblast =

Andryushino Андрюшино
- Village
- Location within Vologda Oblast Location within Russia
- Coordinates: 59°23′N 38°27′E
- Country: Russia
- Region: Vologda Oblast
- District: Sheksninsky District
- Time zone: UTC+3:00

Andryushino (Russian: Андрюшино) is a rural locality (a village) in Sizemskoye Rural Settlement, Sheksninsky District, Vologda Oblast, Russia. The population was 1 as of 2002.

== Geography ==
Andryushino is located 69 km (43 mi) north of Sheksna (the district's administrative centre) by road. Vskhody is the nearest rural locality.
