= Lyubomirovo =

Lyubomirovo Любомирово
- Selo
- Location within Vologda Oblast Location within Russia
- Coordinates: 59°06′N 38°45′E
- Country: Russia
- Region: Vologda Oblast
- District: Sheksninsky District
- Time zone: UTC+3:00

Lyubomirovo (Russian: Любомирово) is a rural locality (a selo) in Lyubomirovskoye Rural Settlement, Sheksninsky District, Vologda Oblast, Russia. The population was 339 as of 2002. There are five streets.

== Geography ==
Lyubomirovo is located 25 km southeast of Sheksna (the district's administrative centre) by road. Levo is the nearest rural locality.
