= Larionovo, Vologda Oblast =

Larionovo Ларионово
- Village
- Location within Vologda Oblast Location within Russia
- Coordinates: 58°58′N 39°03′E
- Country: Russia
- Region: Vologda Oblast
- District: Sheksninsky District
- Time zone: UTC+3:00

Larionovo (Russian: Ларионово) is a rural locality (a village) in Fominskoye Rural Settlement, Sheksninsky District, Vologda Oblast, Russia. The population was 157 as of 2002.

== Geography ==
Larionovo is located 55 km southeast of Sheksna (the district's administrative centre) by road. Fomisnkoye is the nearest rural locality.
