= Brykino, Vologda Oblast =

Brykino Брыкино
- Village
- Location within Vologda Oblast Location within Russia
- Coordinates: 59°22′N 38°36′E
- Country: Russia
- Region: Vologda Oblast
- District: Sheksninsky District
- Time zone: UTC+3:00

Brykino (Russian: Брыкино) is a rural locality (a village) in Sizemskoye Rural Settlement, Sheksninsky District, Vologda Oblast, Russia. The population was 14 as of 2002.

== Geography ==
Brykino is located 57 km north of Sheksna (the district's administrative centre) by road. Knyazhe is the nearest rural locality.

The Oblast features alternating expansive river valleys and hilly moraines. Its western section is drained by streams feeding into the upper Volga River, while the eastern portion is part of the Northern Dvina River basin, flowing into it through the Sukhona River.
