= Fonino =

Fonino Фонино
- Village
- Location within Vologda Oblast Location within Russia
- Coordinates: 59°21′N 38°15′E
- Country: Russia
- Region: Vologda Oblast
- District: Sheksninsky District
- Time zone: UTC+3:00

Fonino (Russian: Фонино) is a rural locality (a village) in Yershovskoye Rural Settlement, Sheksninsky District, Vologda Oblast, Russia. The population was 2 as of 2002.

== Geography ==
Fonino is located 35 km northwest of Sheksna (the district's administrative centre) by road. Zabolotye is the nearest rural locality.
