= Norovka =

Norovka Норовка
- Village
- Location within Vologda Oblast Location within Russia
- Coordinates: 59°14′N 38°39′E
- Country: Russia
- Region: Vologda Oblast
- District: Sheksninsky District
- Time zone: UTC+3:00

Norovka (Russian: Норовка) is a rural locality (a village) in Churovskoye Rural Settlement, Sheksninsky District, Vologda Oblast, Russia. The population was 10 as of 2002.

== Geography ==
Norovka is located 38 km east of Sheksna (the district's administrative centre) by road. Patrekichevo is the nearest rural locality.
