= Mitkino, Vologda Oblast =

Mitkino Митькино
- Village
- Location within Vologda Oblast Location within Russia
- Coordinates: 59°07′N 38°25′E
- Country: Russia
- Region: Vologda Oblast
- District: Sheksninsky District
- Time zone: UTC+3:00

Mitkino (Russian: Митькино) is a rural locality (a village) in Nikolskoye Rural Settlement, Sheksninsky District, Vologda Oblast, Russia. The population was 3 as of 2002.

== Geography ==
Mitkino is located 10 km southwest of Sheksna (the district's administrative centre) by road. Poteryayevo is the nearest rural locality.
