= Charomskoye =

Charomskoye Чаромское
- Selo
- Location within Vologda Oblast Location within Russia
- Coordinates: 59°20′N 38°37′E
- Country: Russia
- Region: Vologda Oblast
- District: Sheksninsky District
- Time zone: UTC+3:00

Charomskoye (Russian: Чаромское) is a rural locality (a selo) and the administrative center of Sizemskoye Rural Settlement, Sheksninsky District, Vologda Oblast, Russia. The population was 579 as of 2002. There are 9 streets.

== Geography ==
Charomskoye is located 21 km north of Sheksna (the district's administrative centre) by road. Fedotovo is the nearest rural locality.
