= Grigoryevskoye, Sheksninsky District, Vologda Oblast =

Grigoryevskoye Григорьевское
- Village
- Location within Vologda Oblast Location within Russia
- Coordinates: 59°01′N 38°24′E
- Country: Russia
- Region: Vologda Oblast
- District: Sheksninsky District
- Time zone: UTC+3:00

Grigoryevskoye (Russian: Григорьевское) is a rural locality (a village) in Yurochenskoye Rural Settlement, Sheksninsky District, Vologda Oblast, Russia. The population was 8 as of 2002.

== Geography ==
Grigoryevskoye is located 40 km southwest of Sheksna (the district's administrative centre) by road. Vakarino is the nearest rural locality.
