= Polezhayevo, Sheksninsky District, Vologda Oblast =

Polezhayevo Полежаево
- Village
- Location within Vologda Oblast Location within Russia
- Coordinates: 59°18′N 38°38′E
- Country: Russia
- Region: Vologda Oblast
- District: Sheksninsky District
- Time zone: UTC+3:00

Polezhayevo (Russian: Полежаево) is a rural locality (a village) in Sizemskoye Rural Settlement, Sheksninsky District, Vologda Oblast, Russia. The population was 29 as of 2002.

== Geography ==
Polezhayevo is located 50 km northeast of Sheksna (the district's administrative centre) by road. Medvezhye is the nearest rural locality.
