= Yekimovskoye =

Yekimovskoye Екимовское
- Village
- Location within Vologda Oblast Location within Russia
- Coordinates: 59°10′N 38°28′E
- Country: Russia
- Region: Vologda Oblast
- District: Sheksninsky District
- Time zone: UTC+3:00

Yekimovskoye (Russian: Екимовское) is a rural locality (a village) in Nikolskoye Rural Settlement, Sheksninsky District, Vologda Oblast, Russia. The population was 15 as of 2002.

== Geography ==
Yekimovskoye is located 4 km (2.5 mi) south of Sheksna (the district's administrative centre) by road. Chagino is the nearest rural locality.
