= Roitsa =

Roitsa Роица
- Village
- Location within Vologda Oblast Location within Russia
- Coordinates: 59°09′N 38°40′E
- Country: Russia
- Region: Vologda Oblast
- District: Sheksninsky District
- Time zone: UTC+3:00

Roitsa (Russian: Роица) is a rural locality (a village) in Ugolskoye Rural Settlement, Sheksninsky District, Vologda Oblast, Russia. The population was 3 as of 2002.

== Geography ==
Roitsa is located 26 km southeast of Sheksna (the district's administrative centre) by road. Shayma is the nearest rural locality.
