= Kulpino =

Kulpino Кульпино
- Village
- Location within Vologda Oblast Location within Russia
- Coordinates: 59°22′N 38°20′E
- Country: Russia
- Region: Vologda Oblast
- District: Sheksninsky District
- Time zone: UTC+3:00

Kulpino (Russian: Кульпино) is a rural locality (a village) in Yershovskoye Rural Settlement, Sheksninsky District, Vologda Oblast, Russia. The population was 14 as of 2002.

== Geography ==
Kulpino is located 29 km northwest of Sheksna (the district's administrative centre) by road. Tirkovo is the nearest rural locality.
