= Mitrokhovo =

Mitrokhovo Митрохово
- Village
- Location within Vologda Oblast Location within Russia
- Coordinates: 59°00′N 39°04′E
- Country: Russia
- Region: Vologda Oblast
- District: Sheksninsky District
- Time zone: UTC+3:00

Mitrokhovo (Russian: Митрохово) is a rural locality (a village) in Fominskoye Rural Settlement, Sheksninsky District, Vologda Oblast, Russia. The population was 3 as of 2002.

== Geography ==
Mitrokhovo is located 54 km southeast of Sheksna (the district's administrative centre) by road. Vorontsovo is the nearest rural locality.
