= Mys, Sheksninsky District, Vologda Oblast =

Mys Мыс
- Village
- Location within Vologda Oblast Location within Russia
- Coordinates: 59°11′N 38°37′E
- Country: Russia
- Region: Vologda Oblast
- District: Sheksninsky District
- Time zone: UTC+3:00

Mys (Russian: Мыс) is a rural locality (a village) in Churovskoye Rural Settlement, Sheksninsky District, Vologda Oblast, Russia. The population was 16 as of 2002.

== Geography ==
Mys is located 12 km east of Sheksna (the district's administrative centre) by road. Mikhaylovskoye is the nearest rural locality.
