= Osyutino =

Osyutino Осютино
- Village
- Location within Vologda Oblast Location within Russia
- Coordinates: 59°07′N 38°36′E
- Country: Russia
- Region: Vologda Oblast
- District: Sheksninsky District
- Time zone: UTC+3:00

Osyutino (Russian: Осютино) is a rural locality (a village) in Ugolskoye Rural Settlement, Sheksninsky District, Vologda Oblast, Russia. Osyutino is located 15 km southeast of Sheksna (the district's administrative centre) by road. Malgino is the nearest rural locality.
