= Molodishchevo =

Molodishchevo Молодищево
- Village
- Location within Vologda Oblast Location within Russia
- Coordinates: 59°05′N 38°52′E
- Country: Russia
- Region: Vologda Oblast
- District: Sheksninsky District
- Time zone: UTC+3:00

Molodishchevo (Russian: Молодищево) is a rural locality (a village) in Lyubomirovskoye Rural Settlement, Sheksninsky District, Vologda Oblast, Russia. The population was 9 as of 2002.

== Geography ==
Molodishchevo is located 37 km southeast of Sheksna (the district's administrative centre) by road. Davydovo is the nearest rural locality.
