= Malaya Mushnya =

Malaya Mushnya Малая Мушня
- Village
- Location within Vologda Oblast Location within Russia
- Coordinates: 59°23′N 38°20′E
- Country: Russia
- Region: Vologda Oblast
- District: Sheksninsky District
- Time zone: UTC+3:00

Malaya Mushnya (Russian: Малая Мушня) is a rural locality (a village) in Yershovskoye Rural Settlement, Sheksninsky District, Vologda Oblast, Russia. The population was 17 as of 2002.

== Geography ==
Malaya Mushnya is located 29 km north of Sheksna (the district's administrative centre) by road. Bolshaya Mushnya is the nearest rural locality.
