= Konshevo, Sheksninsky District, Vologda Oblast =

Konshevo Коншево
- Village
- Location within Vologda Oblast Location within Russia
- Coordinates: 59°06′N 38°57′E
- Country: Russia
- Region: Vologda Oblast
- District: Sheksninsky District
- Time zone: UTC+3:00

Konshevo (Russian: Коншево) is a rural locality (a village) in Domshinskoye Rural Settlement, Sheksninsky District, Vologda Oblast, Russia. The population was 1 as of 2002.

== Geography ==
Konshevo is located 40 km southeast of Sheksna (the district's administrative centre) by road. Yakovtsevo is the nearest rural locality.
