= Sukholomovo, Sheksninsky District, Vologda Oblast =

Sukholomovo Сухоломово
- Village
- Location within Vologda Oblast Location within Russia
- Coordinates: 59°05′N 38°50′E
- Country: Russia
- Region: Vologda Oblast
- District: Sheksninsky District
- Time zone: UTC+3:00

Sukholomovo (Russian: Сухоломово) is a rural locality (a village) in Lyubomirovskoye Rural Settlement, Sheksninsky District, Vologda Oblast, Russia. The population was 24 as of 2002.

== Geography ==
Sukholomovo is located 34 km southeast of Sheksna (the district's administrative centre) by road. Kuryakovo is the nearest rural locality.
