= Shelukhino =

Shelukhino Шелухино
- Village
- Location within Vologda Oblast Location within Russia
- Coordinates: 59°21′N 38°43′E
- Country: Russia
- Region: Vologda Oblast
- District: Sheksninsky District
- Time zone: UTC+3:00

Shelukhino (Russian: Шелухино) is a rural locality (a village) in Sizemskoye Rural Settlement, Sheksninsky District, Vologda Oblast, Russia. The population was 1 as of 2002.

== Geography ==
Shelukhino is located 39 km northeast of Sheksna (the district's administrative centre) by road. Ploskovo is the nearest rural locality.
