= Nizhny Dor =

Nizhny Dor Нижний Дор
- Village
- Location within Vologda Oblast Location within Russia
- Coordinates: 59°10′N 38°35′E
- Country: Russia
- Region: Vologda Oblast
- District: Sheksninsky District
- Time zone: UTC+3:00

Nizhny Dor (Russian: Нижний Дор) is a rural locality (a village) in Ugolskoye Rural Settlement, Sheksninsky District, Vologda Oblast, Russia. The population was 9 as of 2002.

== Geography ==
Nizhny Dor is located 7 km southeast of Sheksna (the district's administrative centre) by road. Verkhny Dor is the nearest rural locality.
