= Uloshkovo =

Uloshkovo Улошково
- Village
- Location within Vologda Oblast Location within Russia
- Coordinates: 59°15′N 38°36′E
- Country: Russia
- Region: Vologda Oblast
- District: Sheksninsky District
- Time zone: UTC+3:00

Uloshkovo (Russian: Улошково) is a rural locality (a village) in Churovskoye Rural Settlement, Sheksninsky District, Vologda Oblast, Russia. The population was 31 as of 2002.

== Geography ==
Uloshkovo is located 44 km northeast of Sheksna (the district's administrative centre) by road. Churovskoye is the nearest rural locality.
