= Malinukha =

Malinukha Малинуха
- Village
- Location within Vologda Oblast Location within Russia
- Coordinates: 59°16′N 38°31′E
- Country: Russia
- Region: Vologda Oblast
- District: Sheksninsky District
- Time zone: UTC+3:00

Malinukha (Russian: Малинуха) is a rural locality (a village) in Churovskoye Rural Settlement, Sheksninsky District, Vologda Oblast, Russia. The population was 132 as of 2002. There are 2 streets.

== Geography ==
Malinukha is located 18 km north of Sheksna (the district's administrative centre) by road. Rechnaya Sosnovka is the nearest rural locality.
