= Gorokhovskoye =

Gorokhovskoye Гороховское
- Village
- Location within Vologda Oblast Location within Russia
- Coordinates: 59°05′N 38°30′E
- Country: Russia
- Region: Vologda Oblast
- District: Sheksninsky District
- Time zone: UTC+3:00

Gorokhovskoye (Russian: Гороховское) is a rural locality (a village) in Yurochenskoye Rural Settlement, Sheksninsky District, Vologda Oblast, Russia. The population was 18 as of 2002.

== Geography ==
Gorokhovskoye is located 19 km south of Sheksna (the district's administrative centre) by road. Sobolevo is the nearest rural locality.
