= Irma, Vologda Oblast =

Irma Ирма
- Village
- Location within Vologda Oblast Location within Russia
- Coordinates: 59°22′N 38°26′E
- Country: Russia
- Region: Vologda Oblast
- District: Sheksninsky District
- Time zone: UTC+3:00

Irma (Russian: Ирма) is a rural locality (a village) in Yershovskoye Rural Settlement, Sheksninsky District, Vologda Oblast, Russia. The population was 12 as of 2010.

== Geography ==
Irma is located 32 km north of Sheksna (the district's administrative centre) by road. Krasnaya Gorka is the nearest rural locality.
