= Globena =

Globena Глобена
- Village
- Location within Vologda Oblast Location within Russia
- Coordinates: 59°06′N 39°00′E
- Country: Russia
- Region: Vologda Oblast
- District: Sheksninsky District
- Time zone: UTC+3:00

Globena (Russian: Глобена) is a rural locality (a village) in Domshinskoye Rural Settlement, Sheksninsky District, Vologda Oblast, Russia. The population was 10 as of 2002.

== Geography ==
Globena is located 39 km southeast of Sheksna (the district's administrative centre) by road. Kozhevnikovo is the nearest rural locality.
