= Rechnaya Sosnovka =

Rechnaya Sosnovka Речная Сосновка
- Village
- Location within Vologda Oblast Location within Russia
- Coordinates: 59°16′N 38°31′E
- Country: Russia
- Region: Vologda Oblast
- District: Sheksninsky District
- Time zone: UTC+3:00

Rechnaya Sosnovka (Russian: Речная Сосновка) is a rural locality (a village) in Churovskoye Rural Settlement, Sheksninsky District, Vologda Oblast, Russia. The population was 27 as of 2002.

== Geography ==
Rechnaya Sosnovka is located 19 km north of Sheksna (the district's administrative centre) by road. Beregovoy is the nearest rural locality.
