= Biryuchevo =

Biryuchevo Бирючево
- Village
- Location within Vologda Oblast Location within Russia
- Coordinates: 59°14′N 38°12′E
- Country: Russia
- Region: Vologda Oblast
- District: Sheksninsky District
- Time zone: UTC+3:00

Biryuchevo (Russian: Бирючево) is a rural locality (a village) in Zheleznodorozhnoye Rural Settlement, Sheksninsky District, Vologda Oblast, Russia. The population was 6 as of 2002.

== Geography ==
Biryuchevo is located 28 km west of Sheksna (the district's administrative centre) by road. Ostashkovo is the nearest rural locality.
