= Pacha, Vologda Oblast =

Pacha Пача
- Village
- Location within Vologda Oblast Location within Russia
- Coordinates: 59°10′N 38°18′E
- Country: Russia
- Region: Vologda Oblast
- District: Sheksninsky District
- Time zone: UTC+3:00

Pacha (Russian: Пача) is a rural locality (a village) and the administrative center of Zheleznodorozhnoye Rural Settlement, Sheksninsky District, Vologda Oblast, Russia. The population was 446 as of 2002. There are 3 streets.

== Geography ==
Pacha is located 16 km west of Sheksna (the district's administrative centre) by road. Shayma is the nearest rural locality.
