= Rusanovo, Vologda Oblast =

Rusanovo Русаново
- Village
- Location within Vologda Oblast Location within Russia
- Coordinates: 58°58′N 39°02′E
- Country: Russia
- Region: Vologda Oblast
- District: Sheksninsky District
- Time zone: UTC+3:00

Rusanovo (Russian: Русаново) is a rural locality (a village) in Fominskoye Rural Settlement, Sheksninsky District, Vologda Oblast, Russia. The population was 13 as of 2002.

== Geography ==
Rusanovo is located 56 km southeast of Sheksna (the district's administrative centre) by road. Fominskoye is the nearest rural locality.
