= Dumino =

Dumino Думино
- Village
- Location within Vologda Oblast Location within Russia
- Coordinates: 59°02′N 38°42′E
- Country: Russia
- Region: Vologda Oblast
- District: Sheksninsky District
- Time zone: UTC+3:00

Dumino (Russian: Думино) is a rural locality (a village) in Lyubomirovskoye Rural Settlement, Sheksninsky District, Vologda Oblast, Russia. The population was 46 as of 2002.

== Geography ==
Dumino is located 31 km southeast of Sheksna (the district's administrative centre) by road. Nokshino is the nearest rural locality.
