= Tarkanovo =

Tarkanovo Тарканово
- Village
- Location within Vologda Oblast Location within Russia
- Coordinates: 59°11′N 38°26′E
- Country: Russia
- Region: Vologda Oblast
- District: Sheksninsky District
- Time zone: UTC+3:00

Tarkanovo (Russian: Тарканово) is a rural locality (a village) in Nifantovskoye Rural Settlement, Sheksninsky District, Vologda Oblast, Russia. The population was 35 as of 2002. There are 3 streets.

== Geography ==
Tarkanovo is located 8 km west of Sheksna (the district's administrative centre) by road. Kochino is the nearest rural locality.
