= Yurochkino =

Yurochkino Юрочкино
- Village
- Location within Vologda Oblast Location within Russia
- Coordinates: 59°03′N 38°32′E
- Country: Russia
- Region: Vologda Oblast
- District: Sheksninsky District
- Time zone: UTC+3:00

Yurochkino (Russian: Юрочкино) is a rural locality (a village) in Yurochenskoye Rural Settlement, Sheksninsky District, Vologda Oblast, Russia. The population was 172 as of 2002. There are 4 streets.

== Geography ==
Yurochkino is located 31 km south of Sheksna (the district's administrative centre) by road. Khanevo is the nearest rural locality.
