= Sokolye, Sheksninsky District, Vologda Oblast =

Sokolye Соколье
- Village
- Location within Vologda Oblast Location within Russia
- Coordinates: 59°15′N 38°12′E
- Country: Russia
- Region: Vologda Oblast
- District: Sheksninsky District
- Time zone: UTC+3:00

Sokolye (Russian: Соколье) is a rural locality (a village) in Zheleznodorozhnoye Rural Settlement, Sheksninsky District, Vologda Oblast, Russia. The population was 11 as of 2002.

== Geography ==
Sokolye is located 29 km northwest of Sheksna (the district's administrative centre) by road. Biryuchyovo is the nearest rural locality.
