= Svetilovo =

Svetilovo Светилово
- Village
- Location within Vologda Oblast Location within Russia
- Coordinates: 59°07′N 39°05′E
- Country: Russia
- Region: Vologda Oblast
- District: Sheksninsky District
- Time zone: UTC+3:00

Svetilovo (Russian: Светилово) is a rural locality (a village) in Domshinskoye Rural Settlement, Sheksninsky District, Vologda Oblast, Russia. The population was 92 as of 2002.

== Geography ==
Svetilovo is located 43 km east of Sheksna (the district's administrative centre) by road. Papushino is the nearest rural locality.
