= Bolshoye Ivanovskoye =

Bolshoye Ivanovskoye Большое Ивановское
- Village
- Location within Vologda Oblast Location within Russia
- Coordinates: 59°07′N 38°41′E
- Country: Russia
- Region: Vologda Oblast
- District: Sheksninsky District
- Time zone: UTC+3:00

Bolshoye Ivanovskoye (Russian: Большое Ивановское) is a rural locality (a village) in Ugolskoye Rural Settlement, Sheksninsky District, Vologda Oblast, Russia. The population was 29 as of 2002. There are 2 streets.

== Geography ==
Bolshoye Ivanovskoye is located 18 km southeast of Sheksna (the district's administrative centre) by road. Pokrovskoye is the nearest rural locality.
