= Verkhny Dor =

Verkhny Dor Верхний Дор
- Village
- Location within Vologda Oblast Location within Russia
- Coordinates: 59°10′N 38°35′E
- Country: Russia
- Region: Vologda Oblast
- District: Sheksninsky District
- Time zone: UTC+3:00

Verkhny Dor (Russian: Верхний Дор) is a rural locality (a village) in Ugolskoye Rural Settlement, Sheksninsky District, Vologda Oblast, Russia. The population was 5 as of 2002.

== Geography ==
Verkhny Dor is located 8 km southeast of Sheksna (the district's administrative centre) by road. Bylino is the nearest rural locality.
