= Solovarka =

Solovarka Соловарка
- Village
- Location within Vologda Oblast Location within Russia
- Coordinates: 59°25′N 38°47′E
- Country: Russia
- Region: Vologda Oblast
- District: Sheksninsky District
- Time zone: UTC+3:00

Solovarka (Russian: Соловарка) is a rural locality (a village) in Sizemskoye Rural Settlement, Sheksninsky District, Vologda Oblast, Russia. As of 2002, the population was 7.

== Geography ==
Solovarka is located 70 km north of Sheksna (the district's administrative centre) by road. Artemyevo is the nearest rural locality.
