= Semkino =

Semkino Семкино
- Village
- Location within Vologda Oblast Location within Russia
- Coordinates: 59°14′N 38°38′E
- Country: Russia
- Region: Vologda Oblast
- District: Sheksninsky District
- Time zone: UTC+3:00

Semkino (Russian: Семкино) is a rural locality (a village) in Churovskoye Rural Settlement, Sheksninsky District, Vologda Oblast, Russia. The population was 2 as of 2002.

== Geography ==
Semkino is located 39 km northeast of Sheksna (the district's administrative centre) by road. Kukino is the nearest rural locality.
