= Bolshaya Stepanovskaya =

Bolshaya Stepanovskaya Большая Степановская
- Village
- Location within Vologda Oblast Location within Russia
- Coordinates: 59°28′N 38°30′E
- Country: Russia
- Region: Vologda Oblast
- District: Sheksninsky District
- Time zone: UTC+3:00

Bolshaya Stepanovskaya (Russian: Большая Степановская) is a rural locality (a village) in Ramenskoye Rural Settlement, Sheksninsky District, Vologda Oblast, Russia. The population was 16 as of 2002.

== Geography ==
Bolshaya Stepanovskaya is located 79 km north of Sheksna (the district's administrative centre) by road. Levinskaya is the nearest rural locality.
