= Velyushevo =

Velyushevo Велюшево
- Village
- Location within Vologda Oblast Location within Russia
- Coordinates: 59°01′N 39°00′E
- Country: Russia
- Region: Vologda Oblast
- District: Sheksninsky District
- Time zone: UTC+3:00

Velyushevo (Russian: Велюшево) is a rural locality (a village) in Fominskoye Rural Settlement, Sheksninsky District, Vologda Oblast, Russia. The population was 27 as of 2002.

== Geography ==
Velyushevo is located 44 km southeast of Sheksna (the district's administrative centre) by road. Aleksino is the nearest rural locality.
