= Katayevo, Sheksninsky District, Vologda Oblast =

Katayevo Катаево
- Village
- Location within Vologda Oblast Location within Russia
- Coordinates: 59°04′N 38°56′E
- Country: Russia
- Region: Vologda Oblast
- District: Sheksninsky District
- Time zone: UTC+3:00

Katayevo (Russian: Катаево) is a rural locality (a village) in Domshinskoye Rural Settlement, Sheksninsky District, Vologda Oblast, Russia. The population was 24 as of 2002.

== Geography ==
Katayevo is located 43 km southeast of Sheksna (the district's administrative centre) by road. Beloye is the nearest rural locality.
