= Kovshovo, Sheksninsky District, Vologda Oblast =

Kovshovo Ковшово
- Village
- Location within Vologda Oblast Location within Russia
- Coordinates: 59°06′N 38°33′E
- Country: Russia
- Region: Vologda Oblast
- District: Sheksninsky District
- Time zone: UTC+3:00

Kovshovo (Russian: Ковшово) is a rural locality (a village) in Ugolskoye Rural Settlement, Sheksninsky District, Vologda Oblast, Russia. The population was nine as of 2002.

== Geography ==
Kovshovo is located 19 km south of Sheksna (the district's administrative centre) by road. Gramotino is the nearest rural locality.
