= Nizhnyaya Gorka, Sheksninsky District, Vologda Oblast =

Nizhnyaya Gorka Нижняя Горка
- Village
- Location within Vologda Oblast Location within Russia
- Coordinates: 59°06′N 38°47′E
- Country: Russia
- Region: Vologda Oblast
- District: Sheksninsky District
- Time zone: UTC+3:00

Nizhnyaya Gorka (Russian: Нижняя Горка) is a rural locality (a village) in Lyubomirovskoye Rural Settlement, Sheksninsky District, Vologda Oblast, Russia. The population was 2 as of 2002.

== Geography ==
Nizhnyaya Gorka is located 25 km southeast of Sheksna (the district's administrative centre) by road. Ugolskaya Bolnitsa is the nearest rural locality.
