= Seltsa, Sheksninsky District, Vologda Oblast =

Seltsa Сельца
- Village
- Location within Vologda Oblast Location within Russia
- Coordinates: 59°14′N 38°33′E
- Country: Russia
- Region: Vologda Oblast
- District: Sheksninsky District
- Time zone: UTC+3:00

Seltsa (Russian: Сельца) is a rural locality (a village) in Churovskoye Rural Settlement, Sheksninsky District, Vologda Oblast, Russia. The population was 1 as of 2002.

== Geography ==
Seltsa is located 47 km northeast of Sheksna (the district's administrative centre) by road. Pograyevo is the nearest rural locality.
