= Knyazhe =

Knyazhe Княже
- Village
- Location within Vologda Oblast Location within Russia
- Coordinates: 59°22′N 38°37′E
- Country: Russia
- Region: Vologda Oblast
- District: Sheksninsky District
- Time zone: UTC+3:00

Knyazhe (Russian: Княже) is a rural locality (a village) in Sizemskoye Rural Settlement, Sheksninsky District, Vologda Oblast, Russia. The population was 219 as of 2002. There are 3 streets.

== Geography ==
Knyazhe is located 26 km north of Sheksna (the district's administrative centre) by road. Yeremeyevo is the nearest rural locality.
