= Korotkovo, Sheksninsky District, Vologda Oblast =

Korotkovo Коротково
- Village
- Location within Vologda Oblast Location within Russia
- Coordinates: 59°12′N 38°43′E
- Country: Russia
- Region: Vologda Oblast
- District: Sheksninsky District
- Time zone: UTC+3:00

Korotkovo (Russian: Коротково) is a rural locality (a village) in Chyobsarskoye Urban Settlement, Sheksninsky District, Vologda Oblast, Russia. The population was 2 as of 2002.

== Geography ==
Korotkovo is located 37 km east of Sheksna (the district's administrative centre) by road. Gerasimovo is the nearest rural locality.
