= Kalikino, Sheksninsky District, Vologda Oblast =

Kalikino Каликино
- Village
- Location within Vologda Oblast Location within Russia
- Coordinates: 59°32′N 38°20′E
- Country: Russia
- Region: Vologda Oblast
- District: Sheksninsky District
- Time zone: UTC+3:00

Kalikino (Russian: Каликино) is a rural locality (a village) in Kameshnikovskoye Rural Settlement, Sheksninsky District, Vologda Oblast, Russia. The population was 5 as of 2002.

== Geography ==
Kalikino is located 58 km north of Sheksna (the district's administrative centre) by road. Zadnyaya is the nearest rural locality.
