= Sobolino =

Sobolino Соболино
- Village
- Location within Vologda Oblast Location within Russia
- Coordinates: 59°12′N 38°19′E
- Country: Russia
- Region: Vologda Oblast
- District: Sheksninsky District
- Time zone: UTC+3:00

Sobolino (Russian: Соболино) is a rural locality (a village) in Zheleznodorozhnoye Rural Settlement, Sheksninsky District, Vologda Oblast, Russia. The population was 6 as of 2002.

== Geography ==
Sobolino is located 18 km west of Sheksna (the district's administrative centre) by road. Antipino is the nearest rural locality.
