= Boryatino, Vologda Oblast =

Boryatino Борятино
- Village
- Location within Vologda Oblast Location within Russia
- Coordinates: 59°06′N 38°49′E
- Country: Russia
- Region: Vologda Oblast
- District: Sheksninsky District
- Time zone: UTC+3:00

Boryatino (Russian: Борятино) is a rural locality (a village) in Lyubomirovskoye Rural Settlement, Sheksninsky District, Vologda Oblast, Russia. The population was 4 as of 2002.

== Geography ==
Boryatino is located 34 km southeast of Sheksna (the district's administrative centre) by road. Khodyrevo is the nearest rural locality.
