= Cherneyevo, Sheksninsky District, Vologda Oblast =

Cherneyevo Чернеево
- Village
- Location within Vologda Oblast Location within Russia
- Coordinates: 59°07′N 38°55′E
- Country: Russia
- Region: Vologda Oblast
- District: Sheksninsky District
- Time zone: UTC+3:00

Cherneyevo (Russian: Чернеево) is a rural locality (a village) in Domshinskoye Rural Settlement, Sheksninsky District, Vologda Oblast, Russia. The population was 311 as of 2002.

== Geography ==
Cherneyevo is located 33 km southeast of Sheksna (the district's administrative centre) by road. Dyakonitsa is the nearest rural locality.
