= Maloye Pankino =

Maloye Pankino Малое Панькино
- Village
- Location within Vologda Oblast Location within Russia
- Coordinates: 59°06′N 38°29′E
- Country: Russia
- Region: Vologda Oblast
- District: Sheksninsky District
- Time zone: UTC+3:00

Maloye Pankino (Russian: Малое Панькино) is a rural locality (a village) in Yurochenskoye Rural Settlement, Sheksninsky District, Vologda Oblast, Russia. The population was 3 as of 2002.

== Geography ==
Maloye Pankino is located 17 km south of Sheksna (the district's administrative centre) by road. Boshoye Pankino is the nearest rural locality.
