= Maximovskoye, Sheksninsky District, Vologda Oblast =

Maximovskoye Максимовское
- Village
- Location within Vologda Oblast Location within Russia
- Coordinates: 59°07′N 38°39′E
- Country: Russia
- Region: Vologda Oblast
- District: Sheksninsky District
- Time zone: UTC+3:00

Maximovskoye (Russian: Максимовское) is a rural locality (a village) in Ugolskoye Rural Settlement, Sheksninsky District, Vologda Oblast, Russia. The population was 19 as of 2002.

== Geography ==
Maximovskoye is located 15 km southeast of Sheksna (the district's administrative centre) by road. Pokrovskoye is the nearest rural locality.
