= Slizovo =

Slizovo Слизово
- Village
- Location within Vologda Oblast Location within Russia
- Coordinates: 59°12′N 38°37′E
- Country: Russia
- Region: Vologda Oblast
- District: Sheksninsky District
- Time zone: UTC+3:00

Slizovo (Russian: Слизово) is a rural locality (a village) in Churovskoye Rural Settlement, Sheksninsky District, Vologda Oblast, Russia. The population was 287 as of 2002.

== Geography ==
Slizovo is located 35 km east of Sheksna (the district's administrative centre) by road. Demsino is the nearest rural locality.
