= Vologodsky District =

Vologodsky District Вологодский район (Russian)
- District
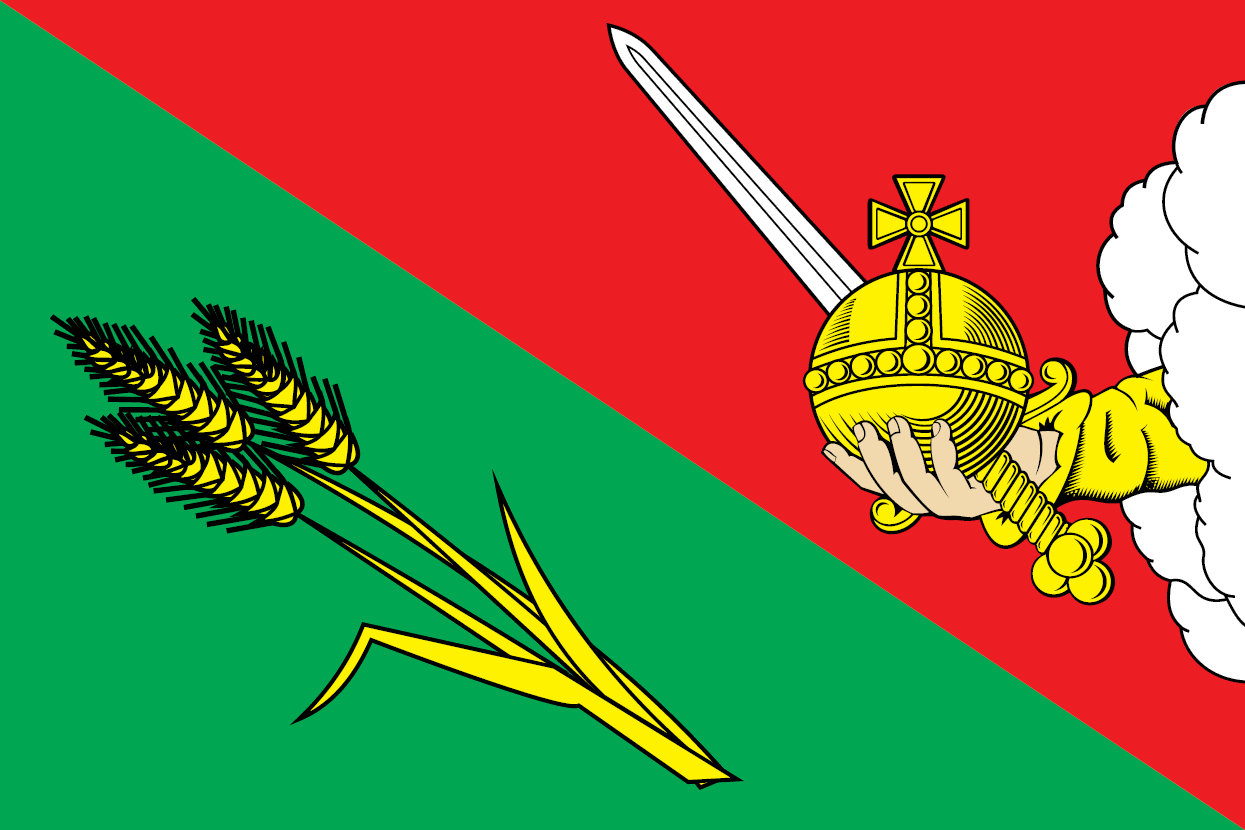
- Flag Coat of arms
- Location of Vologodsky District in Vologda Oblast
- Coordinates: 59°26′N 39°41′E
- Country: Russia
- Federal subject: Vologda Oblast
- Established: July 15, 1929
- Administrative center: Vologda

Area
  - Total: 4,500 km^{2} (1,700 sq mi)

Population (2010 Census)
  - Total: 50,438
  - Density: 11/km^{2} (29/sq mi)
  - Urban: 0%
  - Rural: 100%

Administrative structure
  - Administrative divisions: 23 selsoviet
  - Inhabited localities: 912 rural localities

Municipal structure
  - Municipally incorporated as: Vologodsky Municipal District
  - Municipal divisions: 0 urban settlements, 12 rural settlements
- Time zone: UTC+3 (MSK)
- OKTMO ID: 19620000
- Website: https://volraion.ru/

Vologodsky District (Russian: Волого́дский райо́н) is an administrative and municipal district (raion), one of the twenty-six in Vologda Oblast, Russia. It is located in the center of the oblast and borders with Ust-Kubinsky and Sokolsky Districts in the northeast, Mezhdurechensky District in the east, Gryazovetsky District in the southeast, Poshekhonsky District of Yaroslavl Oblast in the southwest, Sheksninsky District in the west, and with Kirillovsky District in the northwest. The area of the district is 4,500 square kilometers (1,700 sq mi). Its administrative center is the city of Vologda (which is not administratively a part of the district). Population: 50,438 (2010 census); 50,956 (2002 Census); 64,946 (1989 Soviet census). As of 2010, Vologodsky District was the most populous among all the districts of Vologda Oblast.

== Geography ==
The district is elongated from northwest to southeast with Lake Kubenskoye, one of the biggest lakes in Vologda Oblast, forming its northeastern border. The lake is shared between Vologodsky and Ust-Kubensky Districts. Almost all of the district's territory lies in the basin of the Sukhona River. In particular, the rivers in the north lie in the basin of Lake Kubenskoye, the source of the Sukhona, and the southern part is in the basin of the Vologda River, one of the major tributaries of the Sukhona. The Lezha River, another major tributary of the Sukhona, forms the southeastern border of the district, and the Sukhona itself forms the eastern border, upstream from the mouth of the Lezha.

Minor areas in the northwest of the district are in the Sheksna River's basin and some areas in the south of the district are in the basin of the Sogozha River. Both rivers are left tributaries of the Volga, and thus the divide between the basins of the White and the Caspian Seas crosses the district.

== History ==
Vologda was first mentioned in reliable sources in 1264 as a remote settlement controlled by the Novgorod Republic. Subsequently, it became an important settlement on the trade route connecting Central Russia to the White Sea via the Northern Dvina River, and therefore it was a subject of frequent disputes between Novgorod and the Grand Duchy of Moscow. In the 15th century, it became the seat of the quasi-independent Principality of Vologda, which was most of the time controlled by Moscow and which included the current area of Vologodsky District. In the 15th century, the area became a part of the Grand Duchy of Moscow.

In the course of the administrative reform carried out in 1708 by Peter the Great, the area was included into Archangelgorod Governorate. Vologda was specifically mentioned as one of the towns comprising the governorate. In 1780, Archangelogorod Governorate was abolished and transformed into Vologda Viceroyalty, and in 1796 the latter was split into Arkhangelsk and Vologda Governorates. What is now Vologodsky District was then a part of Vologodsky Uyezd of Vologda Governorate.

On July 15, 1929, several governorates, including Vologda Governorate, were merged into Northern Krai, and the uyezds were abolished. Instead, Vologodsky District with the administrative center in Vologda was established as a part of Vologda Okrug. On June 20, 1932, the district was abolished. Some of its territory was transferred to Chyobsarsky, Gryazovetsky, and Ust-Kubinsky Districts, and the rest was administratively subordinated to Vologda.

In the following years, the first-level administrative division of Russia kept changing. In 1936, Northern Krai was transformed into Northern Oblast, which in turn was split into Arkhangelsk Oblast and Vologda Oblast in 1937. On September 1, 1938, Vologodsky District was re-established.

On July 15, 1929, Chyobsarsky District with the administrative center in Chyobsara was established. On December 13, 1962, it was abolished and its territory was split between Vologodsky and Cherepovetsky Districts. On January 12, 1965, Sheksninsky District was established, which included some of the areas of the former Chyobsarsky District, including the urban-type settlement of Chyobsara.

On July 15, 1929, Kubeno-Ozersky District with the administrative center in the selo of Kubenskoye was also established. On December 13, 1962, it was abolished and merged into Vologodsky District.

== Administrative and municipal status ==
Within the framework of administrative divisions, Vologodsky District is one of the twenty-six in the oblast. The city of Vologda serves as its administrative center, despite being incorporated separately as a city of oblast significance—an administrative unit with the status equal to that of the districts.

As a municipal division, the district is incorporated as Vologodsky Municipal District. The city of oblast significance of Vologda is incorporated separately from the district as Vologda Urban Okrug.

== Economy ==
=== Industry ===
In 2011, food industry was the leading industry in the district, producing 61% of the gross product. Timber industry is next in importance.

=== Agriculture ===
Crops are grown in the district, and meat, milk, and eggs are produced. In 2011, the district produced more crops, milk, meat, and eggs than any other district of Vologda Oblast.

=== Transportation ===
One of the principal highways in Russia, M8, which connects Moscow and Arkhangelsk, crosses the eastern part of the district from south to north. In Vologda, two more highways branch off. Another highway, A114, connecting Vologda to Cherepovets and Saint Petersburg, runs west from Vologda, and the highway connecting Vologda with the towns of Kirillov, Vytegra, and Pudozh runs northwest along the axis of the district.

The railroad connecting Yaroslavl and Vologda crosses the district from south to north. In the south of the district, a railroad to Buy branches off southeast. The railroad connecting Vologda with Cherepovets and Saint Petersburg begins in Vologda and runs west through the district.

Lake Kubenskoye and the Sukhona River are both navigable, as well as the Lezha and the Vologda in their lower courses, but there is no passenger navigation.

== Culture and recreation ==
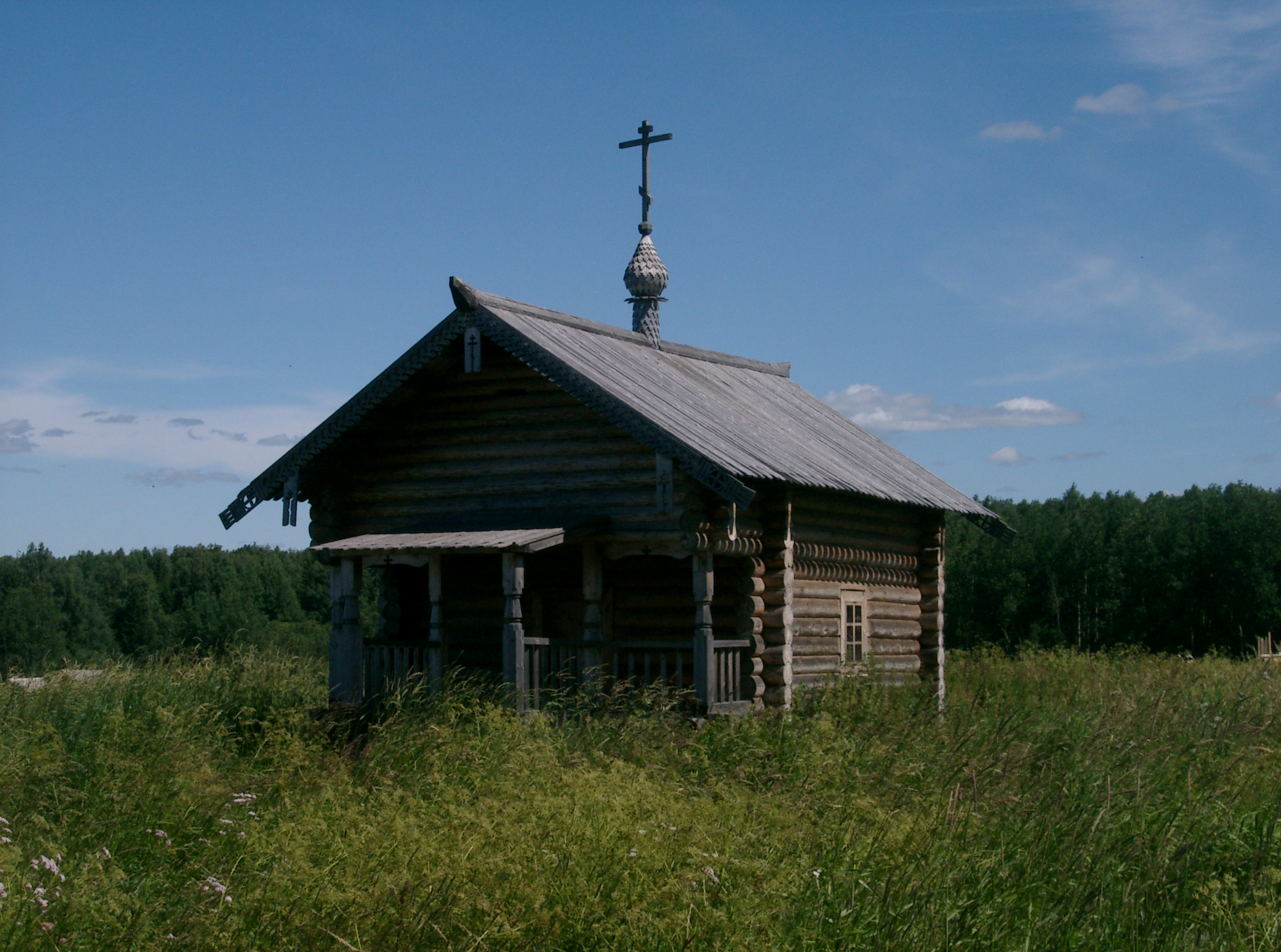
The Chapel of Iliya the Prophet in the Ethnographic Museum in Semyonkovo

The district contains six objects classified as cultural and historical heritage by the Russian Federal law and additionally sixty-eight objects classified as cultural and historical heritage of local importance. The objects protected at the federal level are the Ethnographic Museum in Semyonkovo, the Mozhaysky Estate in Mozhayskoye (formerly Kotelnikovo), the Intercession Church in Pokrovskoye, and the Ulyanov House in Raskopino.

There are three museums in the district. The Ethnographic Museum in Semyonkovo is an open-air museum which is created for preservation of traditional wooden architecture in the central and eastern parts of Vologda Oblast. The former Mozhaysky Estate in the settlement of Mozhayskoye is now the museum of Alexander Mozhaysky. Alexander Mozhaysky, Russian aviation pioneer, who in 1884 constructed a monoplane aircraft and performed an unsuccessful attempt to take off, lived in the estate, which belonged to his wife, between 1860 and 1863. The Vologda District Museum is located in the selo of Kubenskoye.

Sergey Ilyushin, Soviet aircraft designer and the founder of the Ilyushin Design Bureau, was born in 1894 in the village of Dilyalevo, currently in Vologodsky District.
