= Vologodsky Uyezd =

Vologodsky Uyezd (Russian: Вологодский уезд) was one of the subdivisions of the Vologda Governorate of the Russian Empire. It was situated in the southwestern part of the governorate. Its administrative centre was Vologda.

== Demographics ==
At the time of the Russian Empire Census of 1897, Vologodsky Uyezd had a population of 172,187. Of these, 99.4% spoke Russian, 0.2% Komi-Zyrian, 0.1% Yiddish, 0.1% German and 0.1% Polish as their native language.
