= Sheksninsky District =

Sheksninsky District Шекснинский район (Russian)
- District
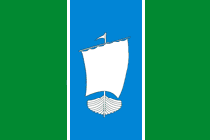
- Flag Coat of arms
- Location of Sheksninsky District in Vologda Oblast
- Coordinates: 59°13′N 38°30′E
- Country: Russia
- Federal subject: Vologda Oblast
- Established: January 12, 1965
- Administrative center: Sheksna

Area
  - Total: 2,500 km^{2} (970 sq mi)

Population (2010 Census)
  - Total: 33,375
  - Density: 13/km^{2} (35/sq mi)
  - Urban: 67.1%
  - Rural: 32.9%

Administrative structure
  - Administrative divisions: 2 Urban-type settlements, 15 Selsoviets
  - Inhabited localities: 2 urban-type settlements, 374 rural localities

Municipal structure
  - Municipally incorporated as: Sheksninsky Municipal District
  - Municipal divisions: 2 urban settlements, 13 rural settlements
- Time zone: UTC+3 (MSK)
- OKTMO ID: 19658000
- Website: http://www.sheksnainfo.ru

Sheksninsky District (Russian: Шексни́нский райо́н) is an administrative and municipal district (raion), one of the twenty-six in Vologda Oblast, Russia. It is located in the center of the oblast and borders with Kirillovsky District in the north, Vologodsky District in the east, Poshekhonsky District of Yaroslavl Oblast in the south, and with Cherepovetsky District in the west. The area of the district is 2,500 square kilometers (970 sq mi). Its administrative center is the urban locality of Sheksna (a work settlement). The district's population was 33,375 (2010 census); 36,007 (2002 Census); 34,679 (1989 Soviet census). The population of Sheksna accounts for 62.8% of the district's total population.

== Geography ==
Sheksninsky District is located on both banks of the Sheksna River, with the western (right-bank) part being considerably smaller than the eastern (left-bank) one. The Sheksna was turned into the Sheksna Reservoir upstream of the settlement of Sheksna, and downstream of that settlement it flows its natural course. A major part of the district belongs to the basin of the Sheksna, with the exception of its southeastern corner, which is divided between the basins of the Sogozha and the Vologda Rivers. As the Vologda belongs to the basin of the Northern Dvina, and both the Sheksna and the Sogozha belong to the basin of the Volga, the district is crossed by the divide between the basins of the White and the Caspian Seas.

The landscape of the district is flat, with large areas allocated for agriculture. The remaining territory is covered by woods.

== History ==
The Sheksna River was always one of the main waterways connecting central Russia with Lake Onega and with the Northern Dvina. The selo of Nikolskoye, currently the work settlement of Sheksna, has been known since 1590.

In the course of the administrative reform carried out in 1708 by Peter the Great, the east of the current area of the district was included into Archangelgorod Governorate. In 1780, Arkhangelogorod Governorate was abolished and transformed into Vologda Viceroyalty, and in 1796 the latter was split into Arkhangelsk and Vologda Governorates. What is now Sheksninsky District was then a part of Vologodsky Uyezd of Vologda Governorate.

On July 15, 1929, several governorates, including Vologda Governorate, were merged into Northern Krai, and the uyezds were abolished. Instead, Chyobsarsky District with the administrative center in the railway station of Chyobsara (which is now an urban-type settlement) was established as a part of Vologda Okrug. In 1936, Northern Krai was transformed into Northern Oblast. In 1937, Northern Oblast was split into Arkhangelsk Oblast and Vologda Oblast. Chyobsarsky District remained in Vologda Oblast.

The western part of the area was in 1708 included into Ingermanland Governorate (known since 1710 as Saint Petersburg Governorate). In 1727, separate Novgorod Governorate was split off. The area became a part of Ustyuzhensky Uyezd of Belozersk Oblast of Novgorod Governorate. In 1776, the area was transferred to Novgorod Viceroyalty. In 1777, Cherepovetsky Uyezd was established, and the area was transferred to it. In 1796, the viceroyalty was abolished, and the area was transferred to Novgorod Governorate. Cherepovetsky Uyezd was abolished and merged into Ustyuzhensky Uyezd. However, in 1802 Cherepovetsky Uyezd was re-established.

In June 1918, five uyezds of Novgorod Governorate, including Cherepovetsky Uyezd, were split off to form Cherepovets Governorate, with the administrative center in Cherepovets. On August 1, 1927, Cherepovets Governorate was abolished, and its area became Cherepovets Okrug of Leningrad Oblast. Simultaneously, the uyezds were abolished, and Prisheksninsky District with the administrative center of Nikolskoye (currently Sheksna) was established. On September 23, 1937, Prisheksninsky District was transferred to newly established Vologda Oblast.

In 1954, the selo of Nikolskoye, the administrative center of Prisheksninsky District, was granted urban-type settlement status and renamed Sheksna. In 1959, Prisheksninsky District was abolished and merged with Chyobsarsky District. On December 13, 1962, as a part of an abortive Khrushchev's administrative reform, Chyobsarsky District was abolished as well and split between Vologodsky and Cherepovetsky Districts.

On January 12, 1965, Sheksninsky District with the administrative center in Sheksna was established.

== Economy ==
=== Industry ===
The economy of the district is based on food industry and timber industry. The Sheksna Hydropower Plant, located in Sheksna, is a major energy producer.

=== Agriculture ===
Agriculture in the district is based on production of meat, milk, and eggs.

=== Transportation ===
A114 highway, connecting Vologda to Cherepovets and St. Petersburg, crosses the district from east to west, passing Sheksna. There are also local roads.

The railroad connecting Vologda with Cherepovets and St. Petersburg also crosses the district from east to west. There are railway stations in both Sheksna and Chyobsara.

The Sheksna is navigable within the district and is a part of the Volga–Baltic Waterway (formerly known as the Mariinsk Canal System), which connects the Rybinsk Reservoir in the basin of the Volga River and Lake Onega in the basin of the Neva.

== Culture and recreation ==
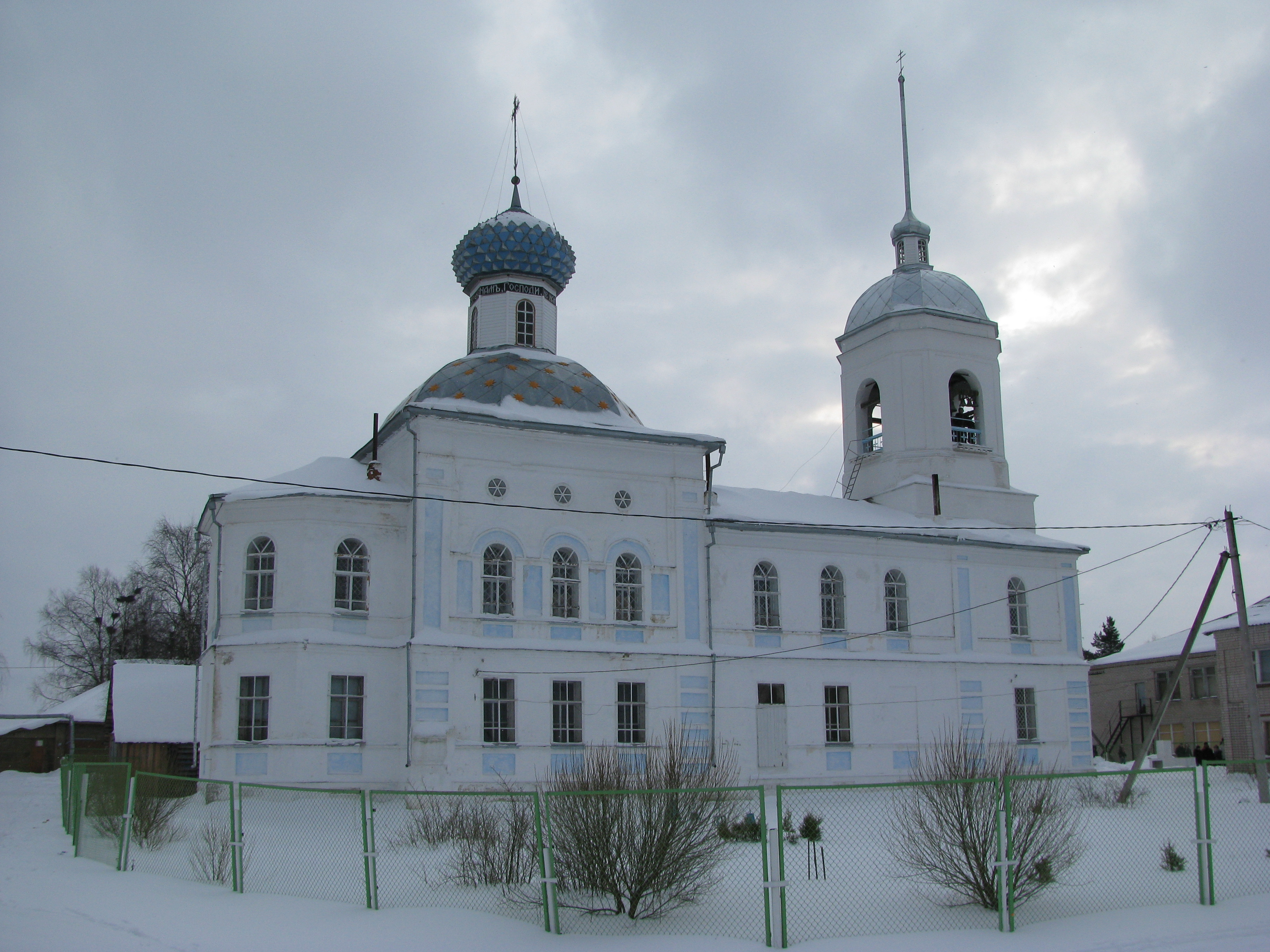
The St. Nicholas Church in Sizma

The only museum in the district is the Historical and Cultural Center, located in Sheksna. It displays collections on local history, as well as temporary exhibitions.
