= Sheksna, Sheksninsky District, Vologda Oblast =

Sheksna Шексна
- Urban-type settlement
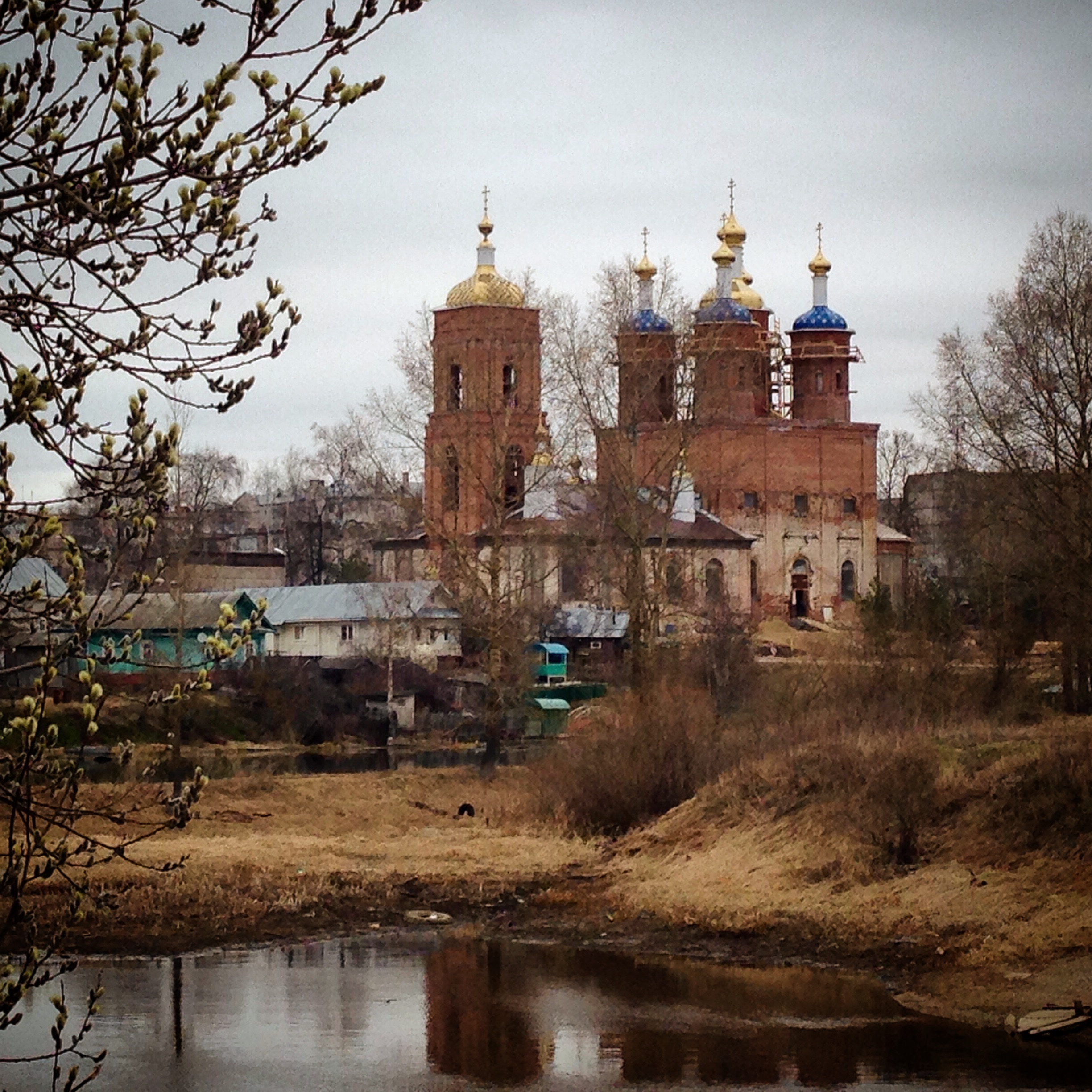
- The Kazan Church in Sheksna

- Coat of arms
- Interactive map of Sheksna
- Location of Sheksna Sheksna (Vologda Oblast)
- Coordinates: 59°13′N 38°30′E
- Country: Russia
- Federal subject: Vologda Oblast
- Administrative district: Sheksninsky District
- Founded: 1590
- Urban-type settlement status since: 1954

Population (2010 Census)
  - Total: 20,953
  - Estimate (2023): 16,048 (−23.4%)

Administrative status
  - Capital of: Sheksninsky District

Municipal status
  - Municipal district: Sheksninsky Municipal District
  - Urban settlement: Sheksninskoye Urban Settlement
  - Capital of: Sheksninskoye Urban Settlement
- Time zone: UTC+3 (MSK)
- Postal code: 162560
- OKTMO ID: 19658151051

Sheksna (Russian: Шексна́) is an urban locality (an urban-type settlement) and the administrative center of Sheksninsky District of Vologda Oblast, Russia, located along the left bank of the Sheksna River, 83 kilometers (52 mi) from Vologda. Municipally, it is incorporated as Sheksninskoye Urban Settlement, one of the two urban settlements in the district. Population: 20,953 (2010 census); 21,615 (2002 census); 15,928 (1989 Soviet census).

It was previously known as Nikolskoye (until 1954).

== History ==
The selo of Nikolskoye was known since 1590. In the course of the administrative reform carried out in 1708 by Peter the Great, it was included into Ingermanland Governorate (known since 1710 as Saint Petersburg Governorate). In 1727, separate Novgorod Governorate split off. The area became part of Ustyuzhensky Uyezd of Belozersk Oblast of Novgorod Governorate. In 1776, the area was transferred to Novgorod Viceroyalty. In 1777, Cherepovetsky Uyezd was established, and the area was transferred to it. In 1796, the viceroyalty was abolished, and the area was transferred to Novgorod Governorate. Cherepovetsky Uyezd was abolished and merged into Ustyuzhensky Uyezd. However, in 1802 Cherepovetsky Uyezd was reestablished. In the early 19th century, the Mariinsky Canal system was constructed.

In June 1918, five uyezds of Novgorod Governorate, including Cherepovetsky Uyezd, were split off to form Cherepovets Governorate, with the administrative center in Cherepovets. On August 1, 1927 Cherepovets Governorate was abolished, and its area became Cherepovets Okrug of Leningrad Oblast. Simultaneously, uyezds were abolished, and Prisheksninsky District with the center of Nikolskoye was established. On September 23, 1937 Prisheksninsky District was transferred to newly established Vologda Oblast.

In 1954 the Nikolskoye obtained the status of urban-type settlement and was remained into Sheksna. In 1959, Prisheksninsky District was abolished and merged with Chyobsarsky District. On December 13, 1962 Chyobsarsky District was abolished as well, and Sheksna was moved to Cherepovetsky District. In 1963-1964 the Sheksna Hydroelectric dam was constructed. On January 12, 1965 Sheksninsky District with the administrative center in Sheksna was established.

== Economy ==
=== Industry ===
The economy of Sheksna is based on food industry. The Sheksna Hydropower Plant, located in Sheksna, is a major energy producer.

=== Transportation ===
A114 highway, connecting Vologda to Cherepovets and Saint Petersburg, passes Sheksna. There are also local roads.

Sheksna has a railway station on the railroad connecting Vologda with Cherepovets and Saint Petersburg.

The Sheksna is navigable within the district and is a part of Volga–Baltic Waterway (formerly known as the Mariinsk Canal System), which connects the Rybinsk Reservoir in the river basin of the Volga and Lake Onega in the river basin of the Neva.

== Culture and recreation ==
Sheksna hosts the Historical and Cultural Center. It displays collections on local history, as well as temporary exhibitions.
