= Voronino =

Voronino is the name of several rural localities in Russia:

- Voronino, Kursk Oblast
- Voronino, Vladimir Oblast
- Voronino, Cherepovetsky District, Vologda Oblast
- Voronino, Gryazovetsky District, Vologda Oblast
- Voronino, Kharovsky District, Vologda Oblast
- Voronino, Kichmengsko-Gorodetsky District, Vologda Oblast
- Voronino, Totemsky District, Vologda Oblast
- Voronino, Ust-Kubinsky District, Vologda Oblast
- Voronino, Ustyuzhensky District, Vologda Oblast
- Voronino, Velikoustyugsky District, Vologda Oblast
- Voronino, Vologodsky District, Vologda Oblast

== See also ==
- Maloye Voronino, Vologda Oblast, Russia
