= Dmitriyevsky (rural locality) =

Dmitriyevsky (Russian: Дми́триевский; masculine), Dmitriyevskaya (Дми́триевская; feminine), or Dmitriyevskoye (Дми́триевское; neuter) is the name of several rural localities in Russia.

== Republic of Adygea ==
As of 2010, one rural locality in the Republic of Adygea bears this name:

- Dmitriyevsky, Republic of Adygea, a khutor in Koshekhablsky District

== Arkhangelsk Oblast ==
As of 2010, three rural localities in Arkhangelsk Oblast bear this name:

- Dmitriyevskaya, Krasnoborsky District, Arkhangelsk Oblast, a village in Cherevkovsky Selsoviet of Krasnoborsky District
- Dmitriyevskaya, Shenkursky District, Arkhangelsk Oblast, a village in Fedorogorsky Selsoviet of Shenkursky District
- Dmitriyevskaya, Verkhnetoyemsky District, Arkhangelsk Oblast, a village in Fedkovsky Selsoviet of Verkhnetoyemsky District

== Ivanovo Oblast ==
As of 2010, two rural localities in Ivanovo Oblast bear this name:

- Dmitriyevskoye, Komsomolsky District, Ivanovo Oblast, a selo in Komsomolsky District
- Dmitriyevskoye, Zavolzhsky District, Ivanovo Oblast, a village in Zavolzhsky District

== Kaluga Oblast ==
As of 2010, one rural locality in Kaluga Oblast bears this name:

- Dmitriyevskoye, Kaluga Oblast, a village in Maloyaroslavetsky District

== Kirov Oblast ==
As of 2010, one rural locality in Kirov Oblast bears this name:

- Dmitriyevskaya, Kirov Oblast, a village in Ichetovkinsky Rural Okrug of Afanasyevsky District

== Kostroma Oblast ==
As of 2010, two rural localities in Kostroma Oblast bear this name:

- Dmitriyevskoye, Buysky District, Kostroma Oblast, a village in Tsentralnoye Settlement of Buysky District
- Dmitriyevskoye, Galichsky District, Kostroma Oblast, a village in Dmitriyevskoye Settlement of Galichsky District

== Krasnodar Krai ==
As of 2010, one rural locality in Krasnodar Krai bears this name:

- Dmitriyevskaya, Krasnodar Krai, a stanitsa in Dmitriyevsky Rural Okrug of Kavkazsky District

== Kursk Oblast ==
As of 2010, one rural locality in Kursk Oblast bears this name:

- Dmitriyevsky, Kursk Oblast, a settlement in Krivtsovsky Selsoviet of Shchigrovsky District

== Moscow Oblast ==
As of 2010, one rural locality in Moscow Oblast bears this name:

- Dmitriyevsky, Moscow Oblast, a settlement in Uspenskoye Rural Settlement of Serebryano-Prudsky District

== Nizhny Novgorod Oblast ==
As of 2010, two rural localities in Nizhny Novgorod Oblast bear this name:

- Dmitriyevskoye, Krasnobakovsky District, Nizhny Novgorod Oblast, a selo under the administrative jurisdiction of the work settlement of Vetluzhsky, Krasnobakovsky District
- Dmitriyevskoye, Sokolsky District, Nizhny Novgorod Oblast, a selo in Volzhsky Selsoviet of Sokolsky District

== Novosibirsk Oblast ==
As of 2010, one rural locality in Novosibirsk Oblast bears this name:

- Dmitriyevsky, Novosibirsk Oblast, a settlement in Kuybyshevsky District

== Oryol Oblast ==
As of 2010, two rural localities in Oryol Oblast bear this name:

- Dmitriyevsky, Livensky District, Oryol Oblast, a settlement in Navesnensky Selsoviet of Livensky District
- Dmitriyevsky, Mtsensky District, Oryol Oblast, a settlement in Vysokinsky Selsoviet of Mtsensky District

== Penza Oblast ==
As of 2010, one rural locality in Penza Oblast bears this name:

- Dmitriyevsky, Penza Oblast, a settlement in Virginsky Selsoviet of Nizhnelomovsky District

== Perm Krai ==
As of 2010, one rural locality in Perm Krai bears this name:

- Dmitriyevskoye, Perm Krai, a selo in Ilyinsky District

== Ryazan Oblast ==
As of 2010, one rural locality in Ryazan Oblast bears this name:

- Dmitriyevsky, Ryazan Oblast, a settlement in Zhmurovsky Rural Okrug of Mikhaylovsky District

== Stavropol Krai ==
As of 2010, one rural locality in Stavropol Krai bears this name:

- Dmitriyevskoye, Stavropol Krai, a selo in Krasnogvardeysky District

== Tula Oblast ==
As of 2010, one rural locality in Tula Oblast bears this name:

- Dmitriyevskoye, Tula Oblast, a selo in Dmitriyevsky Rural Okrug of Zaoksky District

== Vladimir Oblast ==
As of 2010, one rural locality in Vladimir Oblast bears this name:

- Dmitriyevskoye, Vladimir Oblast, a village in Kovrovsky District

== Vologda Oblast ==
As of 2010, six rural localities in Vologda Oblast bear this name:

- Dmitriyevskoye, Dmitriyevsky Selsoviet, Cherepovetsky District, Vologda Oblast, a selo in Dmitriyevsky Selsoviet of Cherepovetsky District
- Dmitriyevskoye, Surkovsky Selsoviet, Cherepovetsky District, Vologda Oblast, a selo in Surkovsky Selsoviet of Cherepovetsky District
- Dmitriyevskoye, Gryazovetsky District, Vologda Oblast, a selo in Minkinsky Selsoviet of Gryazovetsky District
- Dmitriyevskoye, Novlensky Selsoviet, Vologodsky District, Vologda Oblast, a village in Novlensky Selsoviet of Vologodsky District
- Dmitriyevskoye, Spassky Selsoviet, Vologodsky District, Vologda Oblast, a village in Spassky Selsoviet of Vologodsky District
- Dmitriyevskaya, Vologda Oblast, a village in Verkhneramensky Selsoviet of Ust-Kubinsky District

== Voronezh Oblast ==
As of 2010, one rural locality in Voronezh Oblast bears this name:

- Dmitriyevsky, Voronezh Oblast, a khutor in Ostryanskoye Rural Settlement of Nizhnedevitsky District

== Yaroslavl Oblast ==
As of 2010, seven rural localities in Yaroslavl Oblast bear this name:

- Dmitriyevskoye, Dmitriyevsky Rural Okrug, Danilovsky District, Yaroslavl Oblast, a selo in Dmitriyevsky Rural Okrug of Danilovsky District
- Dmitriyevskoye, Semlovsky Rural Okrug, Danilovsky District, Yaroslavl Oblast, a village in Semlovsky Rural Okrug of Danilovsky District
- Dmitriyevskoye, Pereslavsky District, Yaroslavl Oblast, a selo in Dmitriyevsky Rural Okrug of Pereslavsky District
- Dmitriyevskoye, Poshekhonsky District, Yaroslavl Oblast, a selo in Oktyabrsky Rural Okrug of Poshekhonsky District
- Dmitriyevskoye, Tutayevsky District, Yaroslavl Oblast, a village in Rodionovsky Rural Okrug of Tutayevsky District
- Dmitriyevskoye, Glebovsky Rural Okrug, Yaroslavsky District, Yaroslavl Oblast, a village in Glebovsky Rural Okrug of Yaroslavsky District
- Dmitriyevskoye, Mordvinovsky Rural Okrug, Yaroslavsky District, Yaroslavl Oblast, a selo in Mordvinovsky Rural Okrug of Yaroslavsky District
