= Afanasovskaya =

Afanasovskaya Афанасовская
- Village
- Location within Vologda Oblast Location within Russia
- Coordinates: 59°57′N 39°20′E
- Country: Russia
- Region: Vologda Oblast
- District: Ust-Kubinsky District
- Time zone: UTC+3:00

Afanasovskaya (Russian: Афанасовская) is a rural locality (a village) in Troitskoye Rural Settlement, Ust-Kubinsky District, Vologda Oblast, Russia. The population was 67 as of 2002. There are three streets.

== Geography ==
Afanasovskaya is located 48 km northwest of Ustye (the district's administrative centre) by road. Lyskovskaya is the nearest rural locality.
