= Ryazanovo, Ust-Kubinsky District, Vologda Oblast =

Ryazanovo Рязаново
- Village
- Location within Vologda Oblast Location within Russia
- Coordinates: 59°51′N 39°27′E
- Country: Russia
- Region: Vologda Oblast
- District: Ust-Kubinsky District
- Time zone: UTC+3:00

Ryazanovo (Russian: Рязаново) is a rural locality (a village) in Nikolskoye Rural Settlement, Ust-Kubinsky District, Vologda Oblast, Russia. The population was 2 as of 2002.

== Geography ==
Ryazanovo is located 37 km northwest of Ustye (the district's administrative centre) by road. Nikolskoye is the nearest rural locality.
