= Ploskovo, Ust-Kubinsky District, Vologda Oblast =

Ploskovo Плосково
- Village
- Location within Vologda Oblast Location within Russia
- Coordinates: 60°12′N 39°19′E
- Country: Russia
- Region: Vologda Oblast
- District: Ust-Kubinsky District
- Time zone: UTC+3:00

Ploskovo (Russian: Плосково) is a rural locality (a village) in Bogorodskoye Rural Settlement, Ust-Kubinsky District, Vologda Oblast, Russia. The population was 20 as of 2002.

== Geography ==
Ploskovo is located 76 km northwest of Ustye (the district's administrative centre) by road. Yezovo is the nearest rural locality.
