= Konanovo, Ust-Kubinsky District, Vologda Oblast =

Konanovo Конаново
- Village
- Location within Vologda Oblast Location within Russia
- Coordinates: 59°58′N 39°17′E
- Country: Russia
- Region: Vologda Oblast
- District: Ust-Kubinsky District
- Time zone: UTC+3:00

Konanovo (Russian: Конаново) is a rural locality (a village) in Bogorodskoye Rural Settlement, Ust-Kubinsky District, Vologda Oblast, Russia. The population was 2 as of 2002.

== Geography ==
Konanovo is located 48 km northwest of Ustye (the district's administrative centre) by road. Kislyakovo is the nearest rural locality.
