= Ikhomovo =

Ikhomovo Ихомово
- Village
- Location within Vologda Oblast Location within Russia
- Coordinates: 60°02′N 39°17′E
- Country: Russia
- Region: Vologda Oblast
- District: Ust-Kubinsky District
- Time zone: UTC+3:00

Ikhomovo (Russian: Ихомово) is a rural locality (a village) in Bogorodskoye Rural Settlement, Ust-Kubinsky District, Vologda Oblast, Russia. The population was 8 as of 2002.

== Geography ==
Ikhomovo is located 55 km northwest of Ustye (the district's administrative centre) by road. Kobylye is the nearest rural locality.
