= Kuznecheyevskaya =

Kuznecheyevskaya Кузнечеевская
- Village
- Location within Vologda Oblast Location within Russia
- Coordinates: 60°03′N 39°04′E
- Country: Russia
- Region: Vologda Oblast
- District: Ust-Kubinsky District
- Time zone: UTC+3:00

Kuznecheyevskaya (Russian: Кузнечеевская) is a rural locality (a village) in Bogorodskoye Rural Settlement, Ust-Kubinsky District, Vologda Oblast, Russia. The population was 14 as of 2002.

== Geography ==
Kuznecheyevskaya is located 70 km northwest of Ustye (the district's administrative centre) by road. Petryayevskaya is the nearest rural locality.
