= Semenovskoye, Ust-Kubinsky District, Vologda Oblast =

Semenovskoye Семеновское
- Village
- Location within Vologda Oblast Location within Russia
- Coordinates: 59°36′N 39°44′E
- Country: Russia
- Region: Vologda Oblast
- District: Ust-Kubinsky District
- Time zone: UTC+3:00

Semenovskoye (Russian: Семеновское) is a rural locality (a village) in Vysokovskoye Rural Settlement, Ust-Kubinsky District, Vologda Oblast, Russia. The population was 2 as of 2002.

== Geography ==
The distance to Ustye is 15 km, to Vysokoye is 6 km. Makaryino is the nearest rural locality.
