= Makaryino =

Makaryino Макарьино
- Village
- Location within Vologda Oblast Location within Russia
- Coordinates: 59°35′N 39°44′E
- Country: Russia
- Region: Vologda Oblast
- District: Ust-Kubinsky District
- Time zone: UTC+3:00

Makaryino (Russian: Макарьино) is a rural locality (a village) in Vysokovskoye Rural Settlement, Ust-Kubinsky District, Vologda Oblast, Russia. The population was 29 as of 2002.

== Geography ==
Makaryino is located 13 km southeast of Ustye (the district's administrative centre) by road. Semenovskoye is the nearest rural locality.

== Things to know ==
Besides being a rural locality in Vysokovskoye Rural Settlement it has also been linked to various jute colonies such as Karag and Pan.
