= Klyzhovo =

Klyzhovo Клыжово
- Village
- Location within Vologda Oblast Location within Russia
- Coordinates: 59°31′N 39°54′E
- Country: Russia
- Region: Vologda Oblast
- District: Ust-Kubinsky District
- Time zone: UTC+3:00

Klyzhovo (Russian: Клыжово) is a rural locality (a village) in Vysokovskoye Rural Settlement, Ust-Kubinsky District, Vologda Oblast, Russia. The population was 3 as of 2002.

== Geography ==
Klyzhovo is located 28 km southeast of Ustye (the district's administrative centre) by road. Kochevatik is the nearest rural locality.
