= Staroye, Ust-Kubinsky District, Vologda Oblast =

Staroye Старое
- Selo
- Location within Vologda Oblast Location within Russia
- Coordinates: 59°47′N 39°54′E
- Country: Russia
- Region: Vologda Oblast
- District: Ust-Kubinsky District
- Time zone: UTC+3:00

Staroye (Russian: Старое) is a rural locality (a selo) in Vysokovskoye Rural Settlement, Ust-Kubinsky District, Vologda Oblast, Russia. The population was 64 as of 2002. There are 2 streets.

== Geography ==
The distance to Ustye is 28.5 km, to Vysokoye is 18 km. Zaborye is the nearest rural locality.
