= Osilkovo =

Osilkovo Осилково
- Village
- Location within Vologda Oblast Location within Russia
- Coordinates: 59°47′N 39°46′E
- Country: Russia
- Region: Vologda Oblast
- District: Ust-Kubinsky District
- Time zone: UTC+3:00

Osilkovo (Russian: Осилково) is a rural locality (a village) in Zadneselskoye Rural Settlement, Ust-Kubinsky District, Vologda Oblast, Russia. The population was 6 as of 2002.

== Geography ==
Osilkovo is located 23 km north of Ustye (the district's administrative centre) by road. Kuznetsovo is the nearest rural locality.
