= Deshevikha =

Deshevikha Дешевиха
- Village
- Location within Vologda Oblast Location within Russia
- Coordinates: 60°01′N 39°17′E
- Country: Russia
- Region: Vologda Oblast
- District: Ust-Kubinsky District
- Time zone: UTC+3:00

Deshevikha (Russian: Дешевиха) is a rural locality (a village) in Bogorodskoye Rural Settlement, Ust-Kubinsky District, Vologda Oblast, Russia. The population was 114 as of 2002. There are 4 streets.

== Geography ==
Deshevikha is located 56 km northwest of Ustye (the district's administrative centre) by road. Ikhomovo is the nearest rural locality.
