= Toropovskaya =

Toropovskaya Тороповская
- Village
- Location within Vologda Oblast Location within Russia
- Coordinates: 59°59′N 39°15′E
- Country: Russia
- Region: Vologda Oblast
- District: Ust-Kubinsky District
- Time zone: UTC+3:00

Toropovskaya (Russian: Тороповская) is a rural locality (a village) in Bogorodskoye Rural Settlement, Ust-Kubinsky District, Vologda Oblast, Russia. The population was 10 as of 2002.

== Geography ==
Toropovskaya is located 52 km northwest of Ustye (the district's administrative centre) by road. Bogorodskoye is the nearest rural locality.
