= Dor, Ust-Kubinsky District, Vologda Oblast =

Dor Дор
- Village
- Location within Vologda Oblast Location within Russia
- Coordinates: 59°52′N 39°13′E
- Country: Russia
- Region: Vologda Oblast
- District: Ust-Kubinsky District
- Time zone: UTC+3:00

Dor (Russian: Дор) is a rural locality (a village) in Troitskoye Rural Settlement, Ust-Kubinsky District, Vologda Oblast, Russia. The population was 6 as of 2002.

== Geography ==
The distance to Ustye is 47 km, to Berezhnoye is 5 km. Shambovo is the nearest rural locality.
