= Shadrino, Ust-Kubinsky District, Vologda Oblast =

Shadrino Шадрино
- Village
- Location within Vologda Oblast Location within Russia
- Coordinates: 60°03′N 39°04′E
- Country: Russia
- Region: Vologda Oblast
- District: Ust-Kubinsky District
- Time zone: UTC+3:00

Shadrino (Russian: Шадрино) is a rural locality (a village) in Bogorodskoye Rural Settlement, Ust-Kubinsky District, Vologda Oblast, Russia. The population was 2 as of 2002.

== Geography ==
Shadrino is located 71 km northwest of Ustye (the district's administrative centre) by road. Petryayevskaya is the nearest rural locality.
