= Kryukovo, Ust-Kubinsky District, Vologda Oblast =

Kryukovo Крюково
- Village
- Location within Vologda Oblast Location within Russia
- Coordinates: 59°51′N 39°37′E
- Country: Russia
- Region: Vologda Oblast
- District: Ust-Kubinsky District
- Time zone: UTC+3:00

Kryukovo (Russian: Крюково) is a rural locality (a village) in Zadneselskoye Rural Settlement, Ust-Kubinsky District, Vologda Oblast, Russia. The population was 4 as of 2002. Kryukovo is located 34 km north of Ustye (the district's administrative centre) by road. Kuzminskoye is the nearest rural locality.
