= Shelkovo =

Shelkovo Шелково
- Village
- Location within Vologda Oblast Location within Russia
- Coordinates: 59°36′N 39°45′E
- Country: Russia
- Region: Vologda Oblast
- District: Ust-Kubinsky District
- Time zone: UTC+3:00

Shelkovo (Russian: Шелково) is a rural locality (a village) in Vysokovskoye Rural Settlement, Ust-Kubinsky District, Vologda Oblast, Russia. The population was 4 as of 2002.

== Geography ==
Shelkovo is located 11 km southeast of Ustye (the district's administrative centre) by road. Makaryino is the nearest rural locality.
