= Malaya Gora =

Malaya Gora Малая Гора
- Village
- Location within Vologda Oblast Location within Russia
- Coordinates: 60°07′N 39°21′E
- Country: Russia
- Region: Vologda Oblast
- District: Ust-Kubinsky District
- Time zone: UTC+3:00

Malaya Gora (Russian: Малая Гора) is a rural locality (a village) in Bogorodskoye Rural Settlement, Ust-Kubinsky District, Vologda Oblast, Russia. The population was 87 as of 2002. There are 2 streets.

== Geography ==
The distance to Ustye is 66.5 km, to Bogorodskoye is 16 km. Dmitriyevskaya is the nearest rural locality.
