= Bakrylovo =

Bakrylovo Бакрылово
- Village
- Location within Vologda Oblast Location within Russia
- Coordinates: 59°42′N 39°50′E
- Country: Russia
- Region: Vologda Oblast
- District: Ust-Kubinsky District
- Time zone: UTC+3:00

Bakrylovo (Russian: Бакрылово) is a rural locality (a village) in Vysokovskoye Rural Settlement, Ust-Kubinsky District, Vologda Oblast, Russia. The population was 10 as of 2002. There are 3 streets.

== Geography ==
Bakrylovo is located 13 km northeast of Ustye (the district's administrative centre) by road. Gorka is the nearest rural locality.
