= Zhdanovskaya, Ust-Kubinsky District, Vologda Oblast =

Zhdanovskaya Ждановская
- Village
- Location within Vologda Oblast Location within Russia
- Coordinates: 59°46′N 39°18′E
- Country: Russia
- Region: Vologda Oblast
- District: Ust-Kubinsky District
- Time zone: UTC+3:00

Zhdanovskaya (Russian: Ждановская) is a rural locality (a village) in Nikolskoye Rural Settlement, Ust-Kubinsky District, Vologda Oblast, Russia. The population was 2 as of 2002.

== Geography ==
Zhdanovskaya is located 43 km northwest of Ustye (the district's administrative centre) by road. Mys is the nearest rural locality.
