= Filenskoye =

Filenskoye Филенское
- Village
- Location within Vologda Oblast Location within Russia
- Coordinates: 59°50′N 39°21′E
- Country: Russia
- Region: Vologda Oblast
- District: Ust-Kubinsky District
- Time zone: UTC+3:00

Filenskoye (Russian: Филенское) is a rural locality (a village) in Nikolskoye Rural Settlement, Ust-Kubinsky District, Vologda Oblast, Russia. The population was 24, as of 2002.

== Geography ==
Filenskoye is located 33 km northwest of Ustye (the district's administrative centre) by road. Nikolskoye is the nearest rural locality.
