= Malaya Verkhotina =

Malaya Verkhotina Малая Верхотина
- Village
- Location within Vologda Oblast Location within Russia
- Coordinates: 59°33′N 39°48′E
- Country: Russia
- Region: Vologda Oblast
- District: Ust-Kubinsky District
- Time zone: UTC+3:00

Malaya Verkhotina (Russian: Малая Верхотина) is a rural locality (a village) in Vysokovskoye Rural Settlement, Ust-Kubinsky District, Vologda Oblast, Russia. The population was 1 as of 2002.

== Geography ==
Malaya Verkhotina is located 23 km southeast of Ustye (the district's administrative centre) by road. Maloye Linyakovo is the nearest rural locality.
