= Mesto Alexandrovo =

Mesto Alexandrovo Место Александрово
- Selo
- Location within Vologda Oblast Location within Russia
- Coordinates: 59°35′N 39°44′E
- Country: Russia
- Region: Vologda Oblast
- District: Ust-Kubinsky District
- Time zone: UTC+3:00

Mesto Alexandrovo (Russian: Место Александрово) is a rural locality (a selo) in Vysokovskoye Rural Settlement, Ust-Kubinsky District, Vologda Oblast, Russia. The population was 29 as of 2002. There are 2 streets.

== Geography ==
Mesto Alexandrovo is located 18 km southwest of Ustye (the district's administrative centre) by road. Makaryino is the nearest rural locality.
