= Petryayevskaya =

Petryayevskaya Петряевская
- Village
- Location within Vologda Oblast Location within Russia
- Coordinates: 60°03′N 39°04′E
- Country: Russia
- Region: Vologda Oblast
- District: Ust-Kubinsky District
- Time zone: UTC+3:00

Petryayevskaya (Russian: Петряевская) is a rural locality (a village) in Bogorodskoye Rural Settlement, Ust-Kubinsky District, Vologda Oblast, Russia. The population was 98 as of 2002. There are 2 streets.

== Geography ==
Petryayevskaya is located 71 km northwest of Ustye (the district's administrative centre) by road. Markovskaya is the nearest rural locality.
