= Pogost Trifon =

Pogost Trifon Погост Трифон
- Selo
- Location within Vologda Oblast Location within Russia
- Coordinates: 59°54′N 39°15′E
- Country: Russia
- Region: Vologda Oblast
- District: Ust-Kubinsky District
- Time zone: UTC+3:00

Pogost Trifon (Russian: Погост Трифон) is a rural locality (a selo) in Troitskoye Rural Settlement, Ust-Kubinsky District, Vologda Oblast, Russia. The population was 24 as of 2002.

== Geography ==
Pogost Trifon is located 44 km northwest of Ustye (the district's administrative centre) by road. Kurkinskaya is the nearest rural locality.
