= Nikola-Koren =

Nikola-Koren Никола-Корень
- Selo
- Location within Vologda Oblast Location within Russia
- Coordinates: 59°41′N 39°37′E
- Country: Russia
- Region: Vologda Oblast
- District: Ust-Kubinsky District
- Time zone: UTC+3:00

Nikola-Koren (Russian: Никола-Корень) is a rural locality (a selo) in Ustyanskoye Rural Settlement, Ust-Kubinsky District, Vologda Oblast, Russia. The population was 139 as of 2002. There are 4 streets.

== Geography ==
Nikola-Koren is located 10 km northwest of Ustye (the district's administrative centre) by road. Gomanikha is the nearest rural locality.
