= Popovka, Ust-Kubinsky District, Vologda Oblast =

Popovka Поповка
- Village
- Location within Vologda Oblast Location within Russia
- Coordinates: 59°59′N 39°15′E
- Country: Russia
- Region: Vologda Oblast
- District: Ust-Kubinsky District
- Time zone: UTC+3:00

Popovka (Russian: Поповка) is a rural locality (a village) in Bogorodskoye Rural Settlement, Ust-Kubinsky District, Vologda Oblast, Russia. The population was 29 as of 2002.

== Geography ==
The distance to Ustye is 50 km, to Bogorodskoye is 0.5 km.
