= Bogoslovo, Ust-Kubinsky District, Vologda Oblast =

Bogoslovo Богослово
- Selo
- Location within Vologda Oblast Location within Russia
- Coordinates: 59°46′N 39°27′E
- Country: Russia
- Region: Vologda Oblast
- District: Ust-Kubinsky District
- Time zone: UTC+3:00

Bogoslovo (Russian: Богослово) is a rural locality (a selo) in Nikolskoye Rural Settlement, Ust-Kubinsky District, Vologda Oblast, Russia. The population was 78 as of 2002. There are 3 streets.

== Geography ==
Bogoslovo is located 23 km northwest of Ustye (the district's administrative centre) by road. Vecheslovo is the nearest rural locality.
