= Yeltsino, Vologda Oblast =

Yeltsino Ельцино
- Village
- Location within Vologda Oblast Location within Russia
- Coordinates: 59°47′N 39°55′E
- Country: Russia
- Region: Vologda Oblast
- District: Ust-Kubinsky District
- Time zone: UTC+3:00

Yeltsino (Russian: Ельцино) is a rural locality (a village) in Vysokovskoye Rural Settlement, Ust-Kubinsky District, Vologda Oblast, Russia. The population was 2 as of 2002.

== Geography ==
Yeltsino is located 24 km northeast of Ustye (the district's administrative centre) by road. Staroye is the nearest rural locality.
