= Ananyino, Ust-Kubinsky District, Vologda Oblast =

Ananyino Ананьино
- Village
- Location within Vologda Oblast Location within Russia
- Coordinates: 59°39′N 39°53′E
- Country: Russia
- Region: Vologda Oblast
- District: Ust-Kubinsky District
- Time zone: UTC+3:00

Ananyino (Russian: Ананьино) is a rural locality (a village) in Vysokovskoye Rural Settlement, Ust-Kubinsky District, Vologda Oblast, Russia. The population was 1 as of 2002.

== Geography ==
Ananyino is located 12 km northeast of Ustye (the district's administrative centre) by road. Kanskoye is the nearest rural locality.
