= Sukhaya Veret =

Sukhaya Veret Сухая Вереть
- Village
- Location within Vologda Oblast Location within Russia
- Coordinates: 59°53′N 39°39′E
- Country: Russia
- Region: Vologda Oblast
- District: Ust-Kubinsky District
- Time zone: UTC+3:00

Sukhaya Veret (Russian: Сухая Вереть) is a rural locality (a village) in Zadneselskoye Rural Settlement, Ust-Kubinsky District, Vologda Oblast, Russia. The population was 4 as of 2002.

== Geography ==
Sukhaya Veret is located 36 km north of Ustye (the district's administrative centre) by road. Sholokhovo is the nearest rural locality.
