= Shikhovo, Ust-Kubinsky District, Vologda Oblast =

Shikhovo Шихово
- Village
- Location within Vologda Oblast Location within Russia
- Coordinates: 59°45′N 39°38′E
- Country: Russia
- Region: Vologda Oblast
- District: Ust-Kubinsky District
- Time zone: UTC+3:00

Shikhovo (Russian: Шихово) is a rural locality (a village) in Zadneselskoye Rural Settlement, Ust-Kubinsky District, Vologda Oblast, Russia.

== population ==
The population was 19 as of 2002.

== Geography ==
Shikhovo is located 21 km northwest of Ustye (the district's administrative centre) by road. Stafilovo is the nearest rural locality.
