= Isachkovo =

Isachkovo Исачково
- Village
- Location within Vologda Oblast Location within Russia
- Coordinates: 59°59′N 39°18′E
- Country: Russia
- Region: Vologda Oblast
- District: Ust-Kubinsky District
- Time zone: UTC+3:00

Isachkovo (Russian: Исачково) is a rural locality (a village) in Bogorodskoye Rural Settlement, Ust-Kubinsky District, Vologda Oblast, Russia. The population was 4 as of 2002.

== Geography ==
Isachkovo is located 50 km northwest of Ustye (the district's administrative centre) by road. Kuznetsovo is the nearest rural locality.
