= Zadneye, Ust-Kubinsky District, Vologda Oblast =

Zadneye Заднее
- Selo
- Location within Vologda Oblast Location within Russia
- Coordinates: 59°46′N 39°41′E
- Country: Russia
- Region: Vologda Oblast
- District: Ust-Kubinsky District
- Time zone: UTC+3:00

Zadneye (Russian: Заднее) is a rural locality (a village) and the administrative center of Zadneselskoye Rural Settlement, Ust-Kubinsky District, Vologda Oblast, Russia. The population was 466 as of 2002. There are 18 streets.

== Geography ==
Zadneye is located 19 km north of Ustye (the district's administrative centre) by road. Stafilovo is the nearest rural locality.
