= Porokhovo =

Porokhovo Порохово
- Village
- Location within Vologda Oblast Location within Russia
- Coordinates: 59°39′N 39°50′E
- Country: Russia
- Region: Vologda Oblast
- District: Ust-Kubinsky District
- Time zone: UTC+3:00

Porokhovo (Russian: Порохово) is a rural locality (a village) in Vysokovskoye Rural Settlement, Ust-Kubinsky District, Vologda Oblast, Russia. The population was 274 as of 2002. There are five streets.

== Geography ==
Porokhovo is located 8 km northeast of Ustye (the district's administrative centre) by road. Plyushchevo is the nearest rural locality.
