= Chirkovo, Ust-Kubinsky District, Vologda Oblast =

Chirkovo Чирково
- Village
- Location within Vologda Oblast Location within Russia
- Coordinates: 59°37′N 39°43′E
- Country: Russia
- Region: Vologda Oblast
- District: Ust-Kubinsky District
- Time zone: UTC+3:00

Chirkovo (Russian: Чирково) is a rural locality (a village) in Vysokovskoye Rural Settlement, Ust-Kubinsky District, Vologda Oblast, Russia. The population was 44 as of 2002. There are 2 streets.

== Geography ==
Chirkovo is located 14 km south of Ustye (the district's administrative centre) by road. Kochurovo is the nearest rural locality.
