= Korolikha =

Korolikha Королиха
- Village
- Location within Vologda Oblast Location within Russia
- Coordinates: 59°52′N 39°39′E
- Country: Russia
- Region: Vologda Oblast
- District: Ust-Kubinsky District
- Time zone: UTC+3:00

Korolikha (Russian: Королиха) is a rural locality (a village) in Zadneselskoye Rural Settlement, Ust-Kubinsky District, Vologda Oblast, Russia. The population was 186 as of 2002. There are 3 streets.

== Geography ==
Korolikha is located 34 km north of Ustye (the district's administrative centre) by road. Kuryanikha is the nearest rural locality.

== Demographics ==
According to the 2002 Russian Census, Korolikha had a population of 186 residents.

The 2010 Census recorded a population of 131 inhabitants.

As of 1 September 2025, the population was estimated at 134 residents.

=== Population history ===
Year	Population
2002	186
2010	131
2025 (estimate)	134
