= Bogorodskoye, Ust-Kubinsky District, Vologda Oblast =

Bogorodskoye Богородское
- Selo
- Location within Vologda Oblast Location within Russia
- Coordinates: 59°59′N 39°16′E
- Country: Russia
- Region: Vologda Oblast
- District: Ust-Kubinsky District
- Time zone: UTC+3:00

Bogorodskoye (Russian: Богородское) is a rural locality (a selo) and the administrative center of Bogorodskoye Rural Settlement, Ust-Kubinsky District, Vologda Oblast, Russia. The population was 331 as of 2002. There are 10 streets.

== Geography ==
Bogorodskoye is located 51 km northwest of Ustye (the district's administrative centre) by road. Kuznetsovo is the nearest rural locality.
