= Gorka-2 =

Gorka-2 Горка-2
- Village
- Location within Vologda Oblast Location within Russia
- Coordinates: 59°53′N 39°37′E
- Country: Russia
- Region: Vologda Oblast
- District: Ust-Kubinsky District
- Time zone: UTC+3:00

Gorka-2 (Russian: Горка-2) is a rural locality (a village) in Zadneselskoye Rural Settlement, Ust-Kubinsky District, Vologda Oblast, Russia. The population was 9 as of 2002.

== Geography ==
The distance to Ustye is 38 km, to Zadneye is 14 km. Grifonikha is the nearest rural locality.
