= Feninskaya =

Feninskaya Фенинская
- Village
- Location within Vologda Oblast Location within Russia
- Coordinates: 59°56′N 39°21′E
- Country: Russia
- Region: Vologda Oblast
- District: Ust-Kubinsky District
- Time zone: UTC+3:00

Feninskaya (Russian: Фенинская) is a rural locality (a village) in Troitskoye Rural Settlement, Ust-Kubinsky District, Vologda Oblast, Russia. The population was 8 as of 2002.

== Geography ==
Feninskaya is located 49 km northwest of Ustye (the district's administrative centre) by road. Lyskovskaya is the nearest rural locality.
