= Berezhnoye =

Berezhnoye Бережное
- Selo
- Location within Vologda Oblast Location within Russia
- Coordinates: 59°54′N 39°16′E
- Country: Russia
- Region: Vologda Oblast
- District: Ust-Kubinsky District
- Time zone: UTC+3:00

Berezhnoye (Russian: Бережное) is a rural locality (a selo) and the administrative center of Troitskoye Rural Settlement, Ust-Kubinsky District, Vologda Oblast, Russia. The population was 665 as of 2002. There are 16 streets.

== Geography ==
Berezhnoye is located 43 km northwest of Ustye (the district's administrative centre) by road. Kurkinskaya is the nearest rural locality.
