= Ananikha =

Ananikha Ананиха
- Village
- Location within Vologda Oblast Location within Russia
- Coordinates: 59°53′N 39°37′E
- Country: Russia
- Region: Vologda Oblast
- District: Ust-Kubinsky District
- Time zone: UTC+3:00

Ananikha (Russian: Ананиха) is a rural locality (a village) in Zadneselskoye Rural Settlement, Ust-Kubinsky District, Vologda Oblast, Russia. The population was 3 as of 2002.

== Geography ==
Ananikha is located 37 km north of Ustye (the district's administrative centre) by road. Karpovskoye is the nearest rural locality.
