= Kapelino =

Kapelino Капелино
- Village
- Location within Vologda Oblast Location within Russia
- Coordinates: 59°59′N 39°08′E
- Country: Russia
- Region: Vologda Oblast
- District: Ust-Kubinsky District
- Time zone: UTC+3:00

Kapelino (Russian: Капелино) is a rural locality (a village) in Bogorodskoye Rural Settlement, Ust-Kubinsky District, Vologda Oblast, Russia. The population was 4 as of 2002.

== Geography ==
Kapelino lies 61 km by road northwest of Ustye, the distrincts administrative centre. Ostretsovo is the nearest rural locality.
