= Zubarevo =

Zubarevo Зубарево
- Village
- Location within Vologda Oblast Location within Russia
- Coordinates: 59°31′N 39°49′E
- Country: Russia
- Region: Vologda Oblast
- District: Ust-Kubinsky District
- Time zone: UTC+3:00

Zubarevo (Russian: Зубарево) is a rural locality (a village) in Vysokovskoye Rural Settlement, Ust-Kubinsky District, Vologda Oblast, Russia. The population was 4 as of 2002.

== Geography ==
Zubarevo is located 22 km southeast of Ustye (the district's administrative centre) by road. Sergeyevskoye is the nearest rural locality.
