= Vecheslovo =

Vecheslovo Вечеслово
- Village
- Location within Vologda Oblast Location within Russia
- Coordinates: 59°47′N 39°26′E
- Country: Russia
- Region: Vologda Oblast
- District: Ust-Kubinsky District
- Time zone: UTC+3:00

Vecheslovo (Russian: Вечеслово) is a rural locality (a village) in Nikolskoye Rural Settlement, Ust-Kubinsky District, Vologda Oblast, Russia. The population was 17 as of 2002.

== Geography ==
Vecheslovo is located 25 km northwest of Ustye (the district's administrative centre) by road. Bogoslovo is the nearest rural locality.
