= Pogost Luka =

Pogost Luka Погост Лука
- Selo
- Location within Vologda Oblast Location within Russia
- Coordinates: 59°31′N 39°48′E
- Country: Russia
- Region: Vologda Oblast
- District: Ust-Kubinsky District
- Time zone: UTC+3:00

Pogost Luka (Russian: Погост Лука) is a rural locality (a selo) in Vysokovskoye Rural Settlement, Ust-Kubinsky District, Vologda Oblast, Russia. The population was 41 as of 2002.

== Geography ==
Pogost Luka is located 21 km southeast of Ustye (the district's administrative centre) by road. Potepalovo is the nearest rural locality.
