= Filisovo, Ust-Kubinsky District, Vologda Oblast =

Filisovo Филисово
- Village
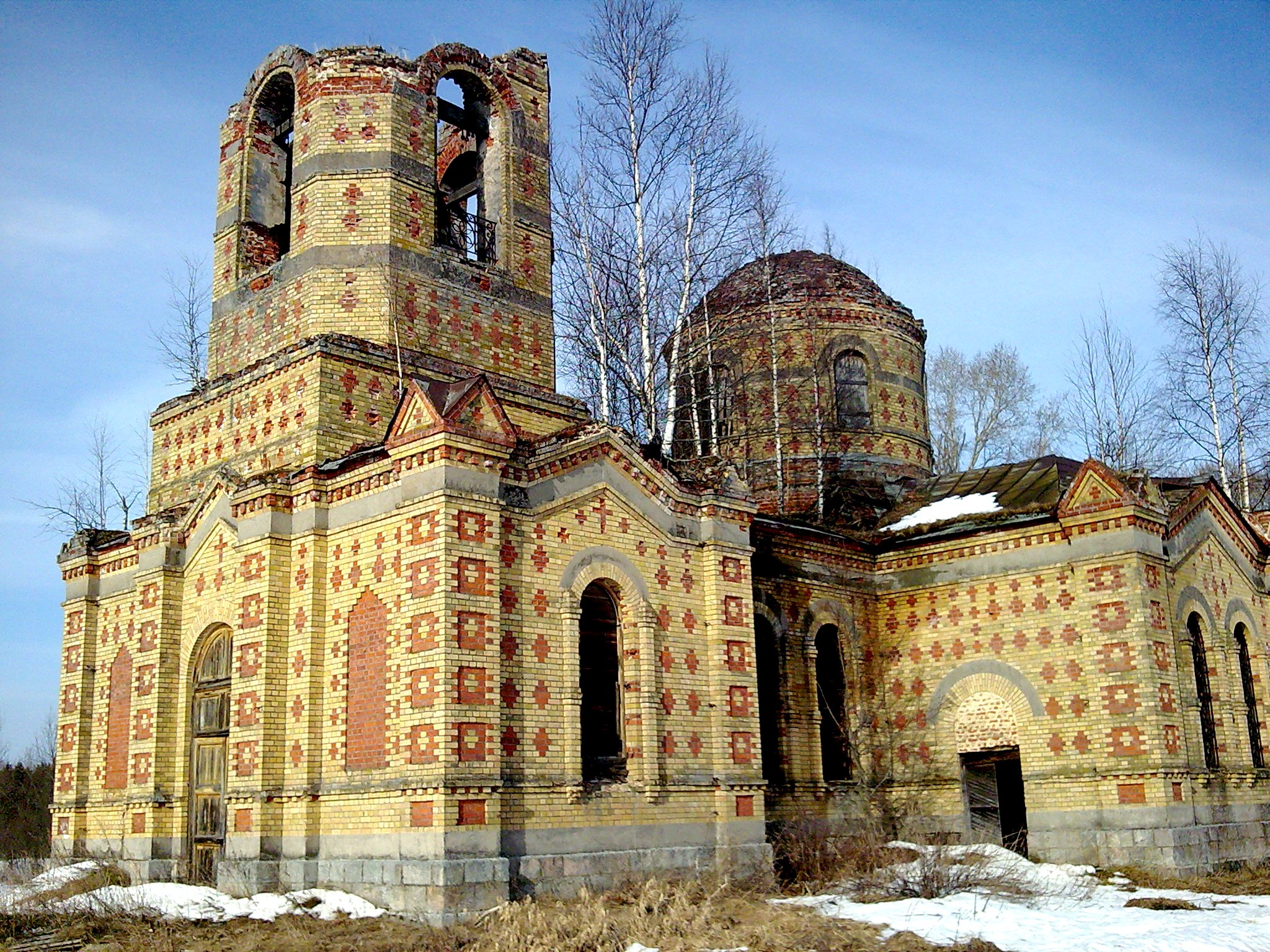
- Saint Nicholas' Church in Filisovo

- Location within Vologda Oblast Location within Russia
- Coordinates: 59°39′N 39°49′E
- Country: Russia
- Region: Vologda Oblast
- District: Ust-Kubinsky District
- Time zone: UTC+3:00

Filisovo (Russian: Филисово) is a rural locality (a village) in Vysokovskoye Rural Settlement, Ust-Kubinsky District, Vologda Oblast, Russia. The population was 18 as of 2002.

== Geography ==
Filisovo is located 7 km northeast of Ustye (the district's administrative centre) by road. Plyushchevo is the nearest rural locality.
