= Cherniyevo =

Cherniyevo Черниево
- Village
- Location within Vologda Oblast Location within Russia
- Coordinates: 60°01′N 39°20′E
- Country: Russia
- Region: Vologda Oblast
- District: Ust-Kubinsky District
- Time zone: UTC+3:00

Cherniyevo (Russian: Черниево) is a rural locality (a village) in Bogorodskoye Rural Settlement, Ust-Kubinsky District, Vologda Oblast, Russia. The population was 1 as of 2002.

== Geography ==
Cherniyevo is located 56 km northwest of Ustye (the district's administrative centre) by road. Yermolinskaya is the nearest rural locality.
