= Gora, Ust-Kubinsky District, Vologda Oblast =

Gora Гора
- Village
- Location within Vologda Oblast Location within Russia
- Coordinates: 59°52′N 39°40′E
- Country: Russia
- Region: Vologda Oblast
- District: Ust-Kubinsky District
- Time zone: UTC+3:00

Gora (Russian: Гора) is a rural locality (a village) in Zadneselskoye Rural Settlement, Ust-Kubinsky District, Vologda Oblast, Russia. The population was 12 as of 2002.

== Geography ==
The distance to Ustye is 36 km.
