= Sverchkovo, Ust-Kubinsky District, Vologda Oblast =

Sverchkovo Сверчково
- Village
- Location within Vologda Oblast Location within Russia
- Coordinates: 59°40′N 39°52′E
- Country: Russia
- Region: Vologda Oblast
- District: Ust-Kubinsky District
- Time zone: UTC+3:00

Sverchkovo (Russian: Сверчково) is a rural locality (a village) in Vysokovskoye Rural Settlement, Ust-Kubinsky District, Vologda Oblast, Russia. The population was 11 as of 2002. There are 5 streets.

== Geography ==
Sverchkovo is located 16 km northeast of Ustye (the district's administrative centre) by road. Borshchevo is the nearest rural locality.
