= Tulpanovo =

Tulpanovo Тулпаново
- Village
- Location within Vologda Oblast Location within Russia
- Coordinates: 59°54′N 39°33′E
- Country: Russia
- Region: Vologda Oblast
- District: Ust-Kubinsky District
- Time zone: UTC+3:00

Tulpanovo (Russian: Тулпаново) is a rural locality (a village) in Zadneselskoye Rural Settlement, Ust-Kubinsky District, Vologda Oblast, Russia. The population was 2 as of 2002.

== Geography ==
Tulpanovo is located 41 km northwest of Ustye (the district's administrative centre) by road. Pogorelovo is the nearest rural locality.
