= Kuryanikha =

Kuryanikha Курьяниха
- Village
- Location within Vologda Oblast Location within Russia
- Coordinates: 59°52′20″N 39°40′14″E
- Country: Russia
- Region: Vologda Oblast
- District: Ust-Kubinsky District
- Time zone: UTC+3:00

Kuryanikha (Russian: Курьяниха) is a rural locality (a village) in Zadneselskoye Rural Settlement, Ust-Kubinsky District, Vologda Oblast, Russia. The population was 50 as of 2002.

== Geography ==
Kuryanikha is located 33 km north of Ustye (the district's administrative centre) by road. Korolikha is the nearest rural locality.
