= Antropikha =

Antropikha Антропиха
- Village
- Location within Vologda Oblast Location within Russia
- Coordinates: 59°53′N 39°43′E
- Country: Russia
- Region: Vologda Oblast
- District: Ust-Kubinsky District
- Time zone: UTC+3:00

Antropikha (Russian: Антропиха) is a rural locality (a village) in Zadneselskoye Rural Settlement, Ust-Kubinsky District, Vologda Oblast, Russia. The population was 14 as of 2002.

== Geography ==
Antropikha is located 37 km north of Ustye (the district's administrative centre) by road. Pochinok is the nearest rural locality.
