= Shambovo =

Shambovo Шамбово
- Village
- Location within Vologda Oblast Location within Russia
- Coordinates: 59°52′N 39°14′E
- Country: Russia
- Region: Vologda Oblast
- District: Ust-Kubinsky District
- Time zone: UTC+3:00

Shambovo (Russian: Шамбово) is a rural locality (a village) in Troitskoye Rural Settlement, Ust-Kubinsky District, Vologda Oblast, Russia. The population was 19 as of 2002.

== Geography ==
Shambovo is located 48 km northwest of Ustye (the district's administrative centre) by road. Popovskoye is the nearest rural locality.
