= Podgorye, Ust-Kubinsky District, Vologda Oblast =

Podgorye Подгорье
- Village
- Location within Vologda Oblast Location within Russia
- Coordinates: 59°51′N 39°40′E
- Country: Russia
- Region: Vologda Oblast
- District: Ust-Kubinsky District
- Time zone: UTC+3:00

Podgorye (Russian: Подгорье) is a rural locality (a village) in Zadneselskoye Rural Settlement, Ust-Kubinsky District, Vologda Oblast, Russia. The population was 7 as of 2002.

== Geography ==
Podgorye is located 33 km north of Ustye (the district's administrative centre) by road. Ignatikha is the nearest rural locality.
