= Mitenskoye, Ust-Kubinsky District, Vologda Oblast =

Mitenskoye Митенское
- Village
- Location within Vologda Oblast Location within Russia
- Coordinates: 59°34′N 39°45′E
- Country: Russia
- Region: Vologda Oblast
- District: Ust-Kubinsky District
- Time zone: UTC+3:00

Mitenskoye (Russian: Митенское) is a rural locality (a village) in Vysokovskoye Rural Settlement, Ust-Kubinsky District, Vologda Oblast, Russia. The population was 131 as of 2002. There are 4 streets.

== Geography ==
Mitenskoye is located 15 km southeast of Ustye (the district's administrative centre) by road. Lavy is the nearest rural locality.
