= Kulakovo, Ust-Kubinsky District, Vologda Oblast =

Kulakovo Кулаково
- Village
- Location within Vologda Oblast Location within Russia
- Coordinates: 60°00′N 39°06′E
- Country: Russia
- Region: Vologda Oblast
- District: Ust-Kubinsky District
- Time zone: UTC+3:00

Kulakovo (Russian: Кулаково) is a rural locality (a village) in Bogorodskoye Rural Settlement, Ust-Kubinsky District, Vologda Oblast, Russia. The population was 1 as of 2002.

== Geography ==
Kulakovo is located 65 km northwest of Ustye (the district's administrative centre) by road. Kapelino is the nearest rural locality.
