= Stafilovo =

Stafilovo Стафилово
- Village
- Location within Vologda Oblast Location within Russia
- Coordinates: 59°46′N 39°39′E
- Country: Russia
- Region: Vologda Oblast
- District: Ust-Kubinsky District
- Time zone: UTC+3:00

Stafilovo (Russian: Стафилово) is a rural locality (a village) in Zadneselskoye Rural Settlement, Ust-Kubinsky District, Vologda Oblast, Russia. The population was 51 as of 2002. There are 2 streets.

== Geography ==
Stafilovo is located 21 km north of Ustye (the district's administrative centre) by road. Shikhovo is the nearest rural locality.
