= Pomazikha =

Pomazikha Помазиха
- Village
- Location within Vologda Oblast Location within Russia
- Coordinates: 59°52′N 39°40′E
- Country: Russia
- Region: Vologda Oblast
- District: Ust-Kubinsky District
- Time zone: UTC+3:00

Pomazikha (Russian: Помазиха) is a rural locality (a village) in Zadneselskoye Rural Settlement, Ust-Kubinsky District, Vologda Oblast, Russia. The population was 4 as of 2002.

== Geography ==
Pomazikha is located 34 km north of Ustye (the district's administrative centre) by road. Gora is the nearest rural locality.
