= Yukovo =

Yukovo Юково
- Village
- Location within Vologda Oblast Location within Russia
- Coordinates: 59°51′N 39°19′E
- Country: Russia
- Region: Vologda Oblast
- District: Ust-Kubinsky District
- Time zone: UTC+3:00

Yukovo (Russian: Юково) is a rural locality (a village) in Nikolskoye Rural Settlement, Ust-Kubinsky District, Vologda Oblast, Russia. The population was 7 as of 2002.

== Geography ==
The distance to Ustye is 34 km, to Nikolskoye is 1 km. Nikolskoye is the nearest rural locality.
