= Zaluzhye =

Zaluzhye Залужье
- Village
- Location within Vologda Oblast Location within Russia
- Coordinates: 59°38′N 39°46′E
- Country: Russia
- Region: Vologda Oblast
- District: Ust-Kubinsky District
- Time zone: UTC+3:00

Zaluzhye (Russian: Залужье) is a rural locality (a village) in Ustyanskoye Rural Settlement, Ust-Kubinsky District, Vologda Oblast, Russia. The population was 1 as of 2002.

== Geography ==
Zaluzhye is located 4 km northeast of Ustye (the district's administrative centre) by road. Shpilikha is the nearest rural locality.
