= Boriskovo, Ust-Kubinsky District, Vologda Oblast =

Boriskovo Борисково
- Village
- Location within Vologda Oblast Location within Russia
- Coordinates: 59°40′N 39°48′E
- Country: Russia
- Region: Vologda Oblast
- District: Ust-Kubinsky District
- Time zone: UTC+3:00

Boriskovo (Russian: Борисково) is a rural locality (a village) in Vysokovskoye Rural Settlement, Ust-Kubinsky District, Vologda Oblast, Russia. The population was 1 as of 2002.

== Geography ==
Boriskovo is located 9 km northeast of Ustye (the district's administrative centre) by road. Belavino is the nearest rural locality.
