= Sidorovskoye, Ust-Kubinsky District, Vologda Oblast =

Sidorovskoye Сидоровское
- Village
- Location within Vologda Oblast Location within Russia
- Coordinates: 59°49′N 39°44′E
- Country: Russia
- Region: Vologda Oblast
- District: Ust-Kubinsky District
- Time zone: UTC+3:00

Sidorovskoye (Russian: Сидоровское) is a rural locality (a village) in Zadneselskoye Rural Settlement, Ust-Kubinsky District, Vologda Oblast, Russia. The population was 6 as of 2002.

== Geography ==
Sidorovskoye is located 28 km north of Ustye (the district's administrative centre) by road. Ivanovskoye is the nearest rural locality.
