= Dmitriyevskaya, Vologda Oblast =

Dmitriyevskaya Дмитриевская
- Village
- Location within Vologda Oblast Location within Russia
- Coordinates: 60°07′N 39°21′E
- Country: Russia
- Region: Vologda Oblast
- District: Ust-Kubinsky District
- Time zone: UTC+3:00

Dmitriyevskaya (Russian: Дмитриевская) is a rural locality (a village) in Bogorodskoye Rural Settlement, Ust-Kubinsky District, Vologda Oblast, Russia. The population was 23 as of 2002.

== Geography ==
Dmitriyevskaya is located 66 km northwest of Ustye (the district's administrative centre) by road. Malaya Gora is the nearest rural locality.
