= Maloye Voronino =

Maloye Voronino Малое Воронино
- Village
- Location within Vologda Oblast Location within Russia
- Coordinates: 59°42′N 39°46′E
- Country: Russia
- Region: Vologda Oblast
- District: Ust-Kubinsky District
- Time zone: UTC+3:00

Maloye Voronino (Russian: Малое Воронино) is a rural locality (a village) in Vysokovskoye Rural Settlement, Ust-Kubinsky District, Vologda Oblast, Russia. The population was 6 as of 2002.

== Geography ==
Maloye Voronino is located 10 km northeast of Ustye (the district's administrative centre) by road. Voronino is the nearest rural locality.
