= Kurkinsky =

Kurkinsky (masculine), Kurkinskaya (feminine), or Kurkinskoye (neuter) may refer to:

- Kurkinsky District, a district of Tula Oblast, Russia
- Kurkinskaya, a rural locality (a village) in Vologda Oblast, Russia
