= Lyskovskaya =

Lyskovskaya Лысковская
- Village
- Location within Vologda Oblast Location within Russia
- Coordinates: 59°56′N 39°20′E
- Country: Russia
- Region: Vologda Oblast
- District: Ust-Kubinsky District
- Time zone: UTC+3:00

Lyskovskaya (Russian: Лысковская) is a rural locality (a village) in Troitskoye Rural Settlement, Ust-Kubinsky District, Vologda Oblast, Russia. The population was 15 as of 2002.

== Geography ==
Lyskovskaya is located 49 km northwest of Ustye (the district's administrative centre) by road. Feninskaya is the nearest rural locality.
