= Dmitriyevsky =

Dmitriyevsky (masculine), Dmitriyevskaya (feminine), or Dmitriyevskoye (neuter) may refer to:

- Dmitriyevsky District, a district of Kursk Oblast, Russia
- Dmitriyevsky (rural locality) (Dmitriyevskaya, Dmitriyevskoye), name of several rural localities in Russia
