= Voronino, Ust-Kubinsky District, Vologda Oblast =

Voronino Воронино
- Settlement
- Location within Vologda Oblast Location within Russia
- Coordinates: 59°41′N 39°46′E
- Country: Russia
- Region: Vologda Oblast
- District: Ust-Kubinsky District
- Time zone: UTC+3:00

Voronino (Russian: Воронино) is a rural locality (a settlement) in Vysokovskoye Rural Settlement, Ust-Kubinsky District, Vologda Oblast, Russia. The population was 10 as of 2002.

== Geography ==
Voronino is located 9 km northeast of Ustye (the district's administrative centre) by road. Maloye Voronino is the nearest rural locality.
