= Lyskovsky =

Lyskovsky (masculine), Lyskovskaya (feminine), or Lyskovskoye (neuter) may refer to:

- Lyskovsky District, a district of Nizhny Novgorod Oblast, Russia
- Lyskovskaya, a rural locality (a village) in Vologda Oblast, Russia
