= Krasnye Baki =

Krasnye Baki Красные Баки
- Work settlement
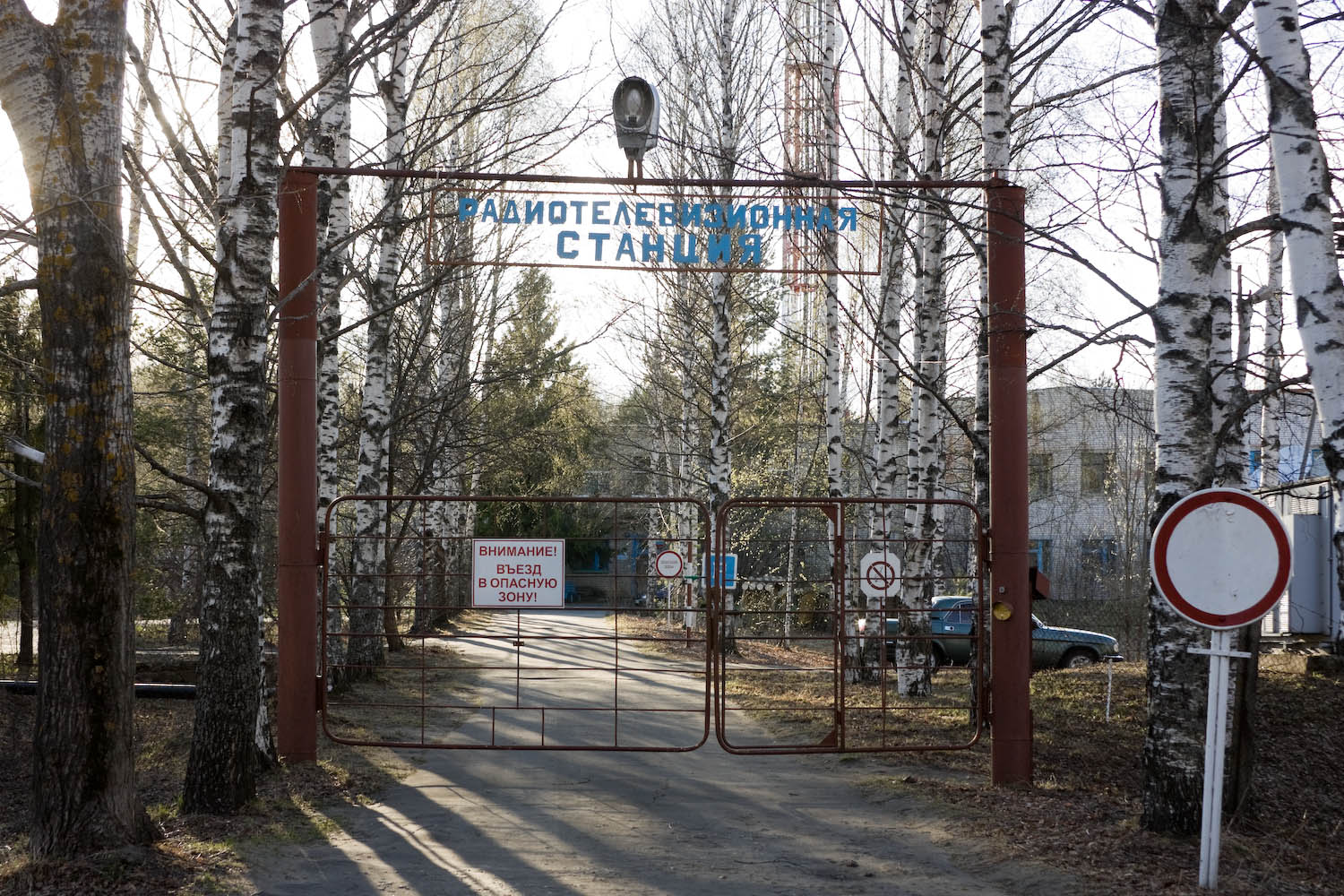

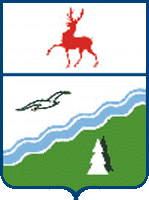
- Coat of arms
- Interactive map of Krasnye Baki
- Location of Krasnye Baki Krasnye Baki (Nizhny Novgorod Oblast)
- Coordinates: 57°07′N 45°09′E
- Country: Russia
- Federal subject: Nizhny Novgorod Oblast
- Administrative district: Krasnobakovsky District

Population (2010 Census)
  - Total: 7,295
  - Estimate (2025): 7,141 (−2.1%)

Administrative status
  - Capital of: Krasnobakovsky District
- Time zone: UTC+3 (MSK)
- Postal codes: 606710, 606711
- OKTMO ID: 22635151051

Krasnye Baki (Russian: Кра́сные Ба́ки) is an urban locality (a work settlement) and the administrative center of Krasnobakovsky District in Nizhny Novgorod Oblast, Russia, located on the Vetluga River. Population: 7,295 (2010 census); 7,944 (2002 census); 8,456 (1989 Soviet census).
