= Voronino, Gryazovetsky District, Vologda Oblast =

Voronino Воронино
- Village
- Location within Vologda Oblast Location within Russia
- Coordinates: 59°00′N 40°14′E
- Country: Russia
- Region: Vologda Oblast
- District: Gryazovetsky District
- Time zone: UTC+3:00

Voronino (Russian: Воронино) is a rural locality (a village) in Komyanskoye Rural Settlement, Gryazovetsky District, Vologda Oblast, Russia. The population was 9 as of 2002.

== Geography ==
Voronino is located 17 km north of Gryazovets (the district's administrative centre) by road. Volotskoy is the nearest rural locality.
