= Kamenny Monastery =

Monastery in Vologda Oblast, Russia

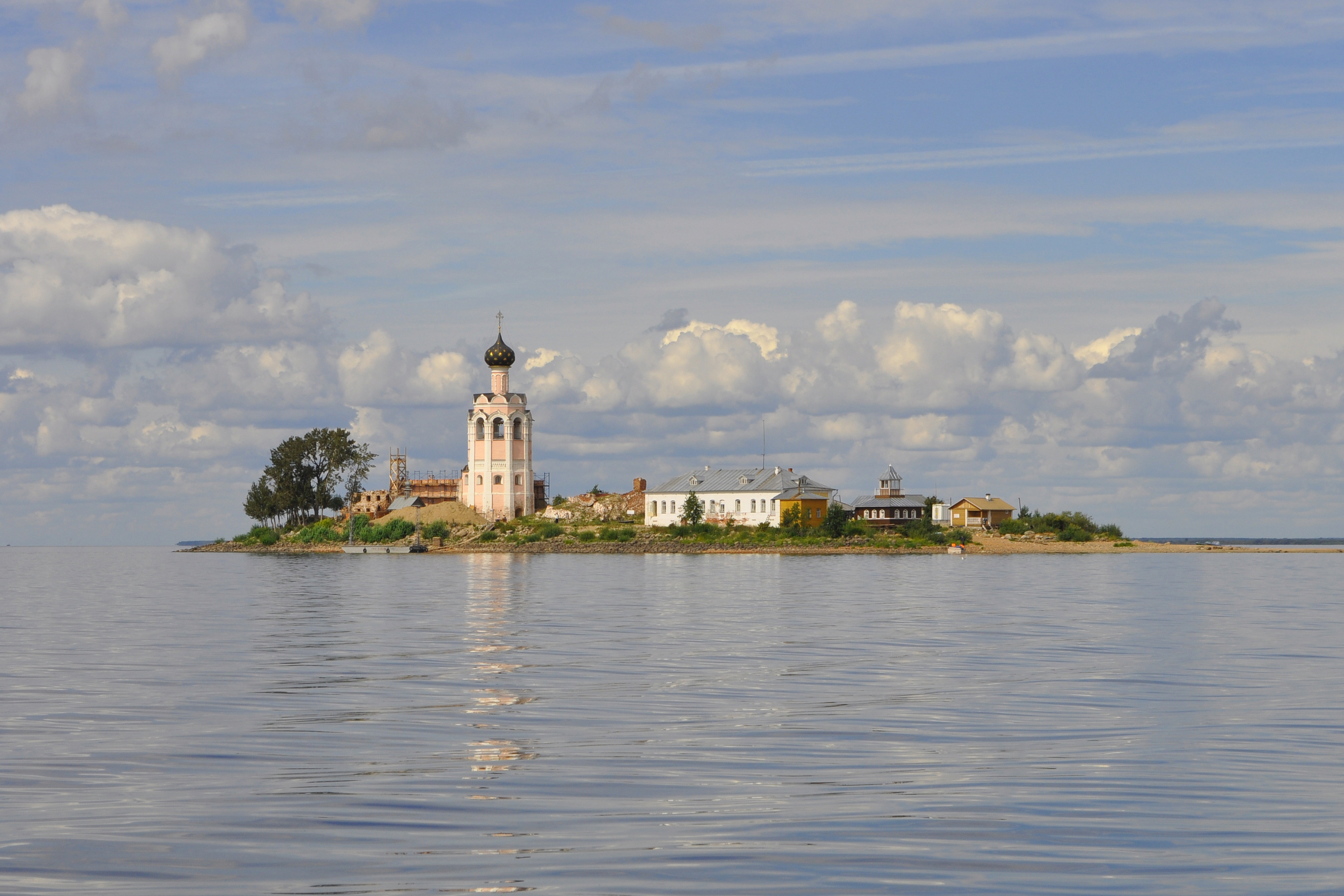
- Kamenny Monastery in 2013

- Location within Russia
- Interactive map of Kamenny Monastery

Monastery information
- Order: Orthodox
- Established: c. 1260
- Disestablished: 1925
- Diocese: Vologda

Site
- Location: Vologda, Russia
- Coordinates: 59°36′27″N 39°34′22″E

Spas-Kamenny Monastery (Russian: Спасо-Каменный монастырь) was the name of a Russian Orthodox monastery situated on a small eponymous island in the very centre of the Kubensky Lake, in Ust-Kubinsky District of Vologda Oblast, Russia. It is distinguished as the first stone monastery of the Russian North.

== Overview ==
Kamenny Island (literally, "Stone Island") is very small, measuring just 120 metres by 70 metres. It is so named after stone ramparts set up by the monks around the island's perimeter in order to preclude its erosion. The lake is known for its inclement weather and frequent storms. The monastery was quite rich, owning seven larger villages (selo), four average villages (seltso) and 98 small villages, in addition to two salt pans in Totma and two branches in Vologda.

== History ==
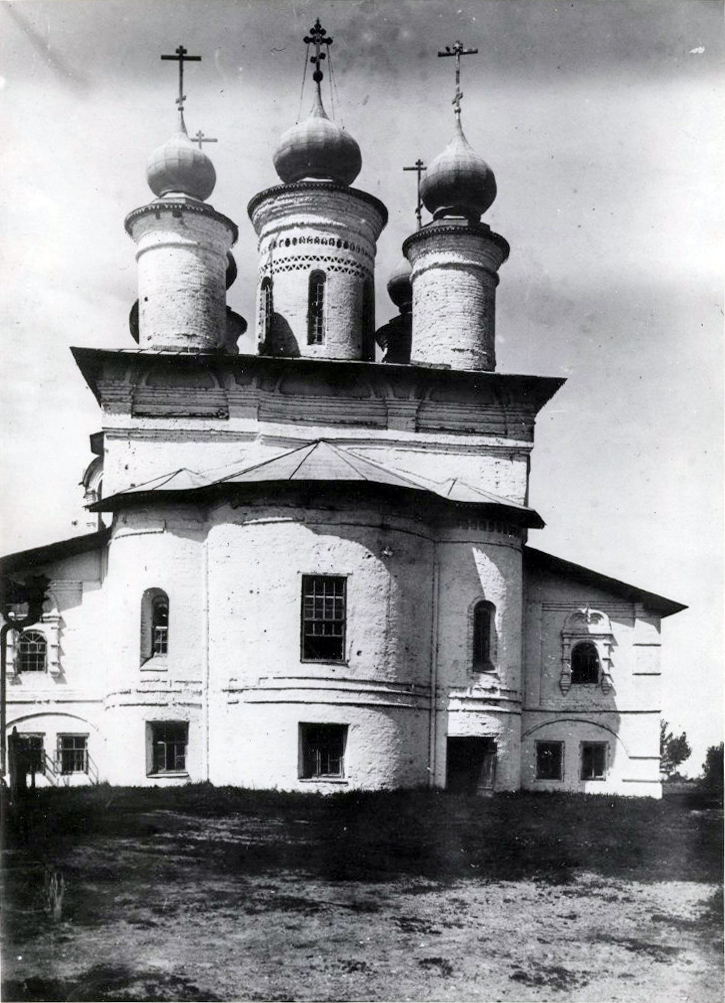
The katholikon before its demolition in the 1920s.

It is believed that during one of such storms, in 1269, Prince Gleb of Beloozero was cast ashore, where he found a small monastic community. The legends of the monks attribute the construction of the first timber cathedral on the isle to the funds subsequently provided by that monarch.

Under Dmitry Donskoy, the Kamenny Monastery was run by Dionisius, a Greek monk who introduced the coenobian rule of Mount Athos, whereby the brethren were closed alike, took their meals (usually limited to bread and scarce vegetables) in the refectory and were bound to possess no private property. Female animals were banned from the isle to avoid any impure thought on the part of the monks.

The monastic community reached its peak under Paisiy Yaroslavov, a former hegumen of the Trinity Lavra and one of the most influential clerics of the time. This starets authored The Tale of the Kamenny Monastery whose main themes are the history of this monastery and the struggle of its monks against paganism in the area.

In 1476 the monastery burnt down. Ivan III's brother Andrey Menshoy, who was the ruler of Vologda, commissioned a stone four-pillared cathedral to be built on the island. The two-storey two-domed edifice was constructed in 1481 by a team of masters from Rostov, who proceeded to erect very similar cathedrals in the Ferapontov Monastery (1490) and Kirillo-Belozersky Monastery (1497). Paisiy Yaroslavov mentions that he engaged the great artist Dionisius to paint a deesis for the cathedral. It is believed that Dionisius's works perished 185 years later, during a great fire, which resulted in the collapse of the domes.

In the 16th century, the Kamenny Monastery did not develop as quickly as the two last-mentioned abbeys, because of the limited territory that the tiny and remote island could afford. In the 1540s, the monks constructed a church-belltower of curious architecture and a refectory, after which the monastery gradually declined to obscurity. It was remembered in Moscow primarily as a place of exile, where the famous Old Believer, Ivan Neronov, was deported. On 24 July 1774 one of the exiles set the monastery on fire, whereupon the monks were transferred for 26 years to Vologda. When they finally returned to the island in 1801, the cathedral was restored with five domes instead of one. The only post-medieval buildings on the island were an inn and two lighthouses, built for the needs of the monastery in the 1870s.

== Closure and destruction ==
The Soviet government closed down the Kamenny Monastery in 1925 and had its brethren evacuated from the island. The buildings were adapted to house a penal colony for minor delinquents. This establishment proved a failure and by 1937 the island had been deserted. The regional administration profited from the situation to blow up the oldest building of the Russian North in order to obtain brick required for construction of the local "palace of culture", which eventually failed to materialise. The ruins of the cathedral are still in situ.

As of 2015, the only building marking the spot of the historic monastery is the church belltower from the 1540s, which is now being repaired by a team of enthusiasts from Vologda and Moscow.

== Restoration ==
In October, 2017, the Holy Synod of the Russian Orthodox Church officially decided to reopen Spaso-Kamenny Preobrazhensky monastery with Dionysius (Vozdvizhenskiy) as hegumen.

== Online references ==
- (in Russian) Kamenny Monastery Restoration Fund
- (in Russian) Kamenny Monastery and Dionisius
- ((ru icon)) (in English) https://www.supernewsworld.com/Russian-Skydivers-Restoring-An-Ancient-Island-Monastery-9566482.html
