= Voronino, Vladimir Oblast =

Voronino Воронино
- Village
- Location within Vladimir Oblast Location within Russia
- Coordinates: 56°09′N 41°59′E
- Country: Russia
- Region: Vladimir Oblast
- District: Vyaznikovsky District
- Time zone: UTC+3:00

Voronino (Russian: Воронино) is a rural locality (a village) in Posyolok Nikologory, Vyaznikovsky District, Vladimir Oblast, Russia. The population was 232 as of 2010. There are 2 streets.

== Geography ==
Voronino is located 18 km southwest of Vyazniki (the district's administrative centre) by road. Nikologory is the nearest rural locality.
