= Krasnobakovsky District =

Krasnobakovsky District Краснобаковский район (Russian)
- District
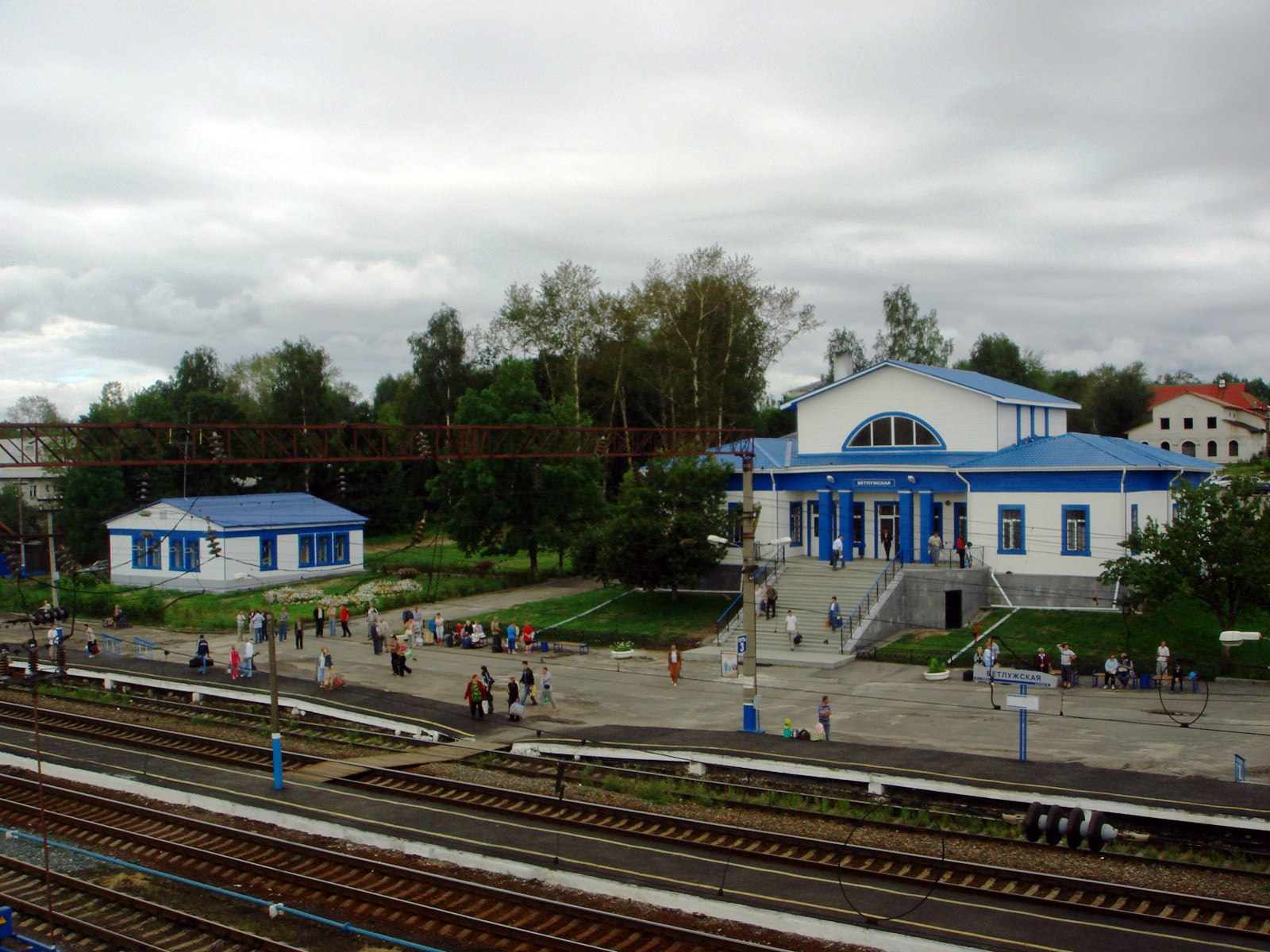
- Railway station in Vetluzhsky, Krasnobakovsky District

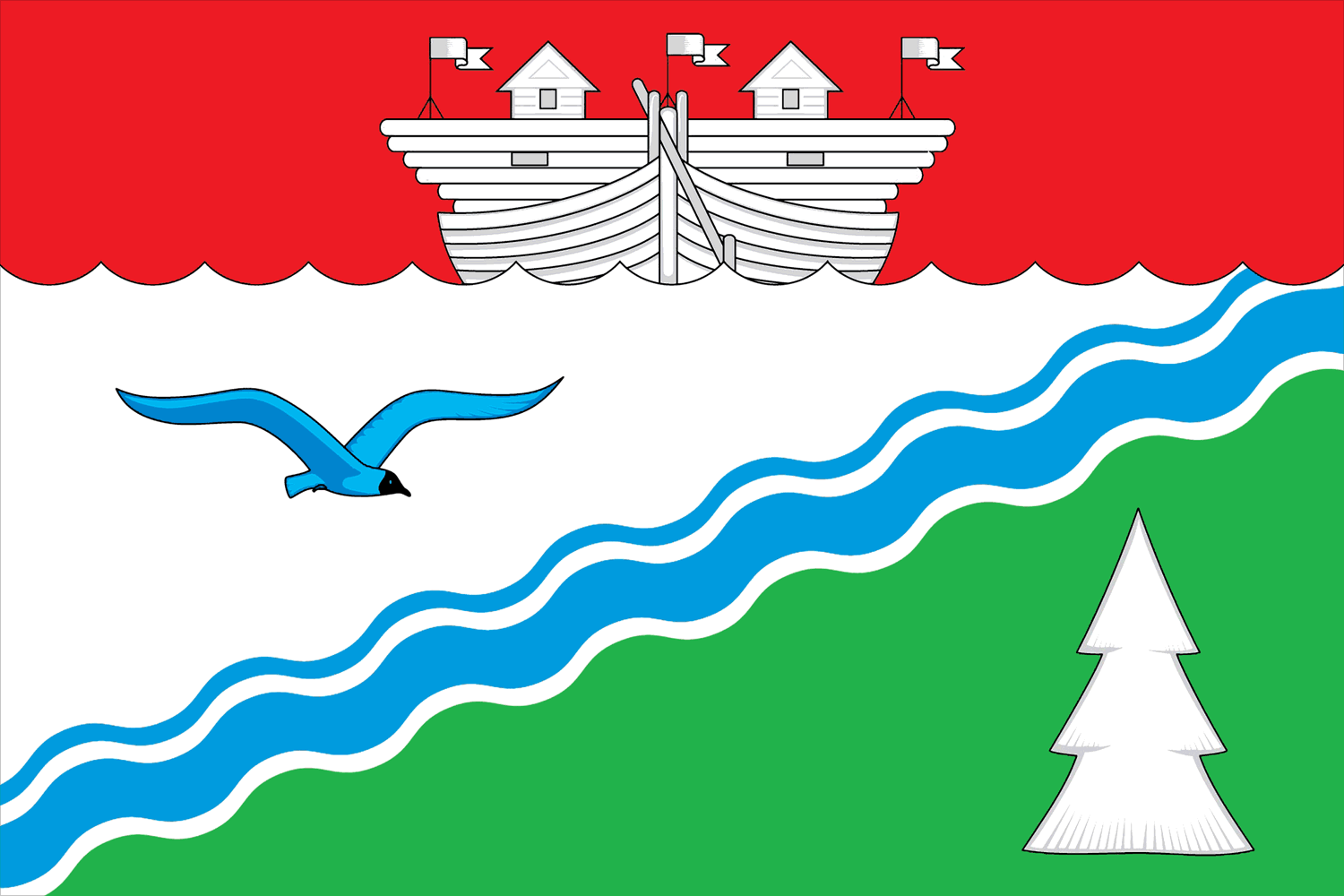
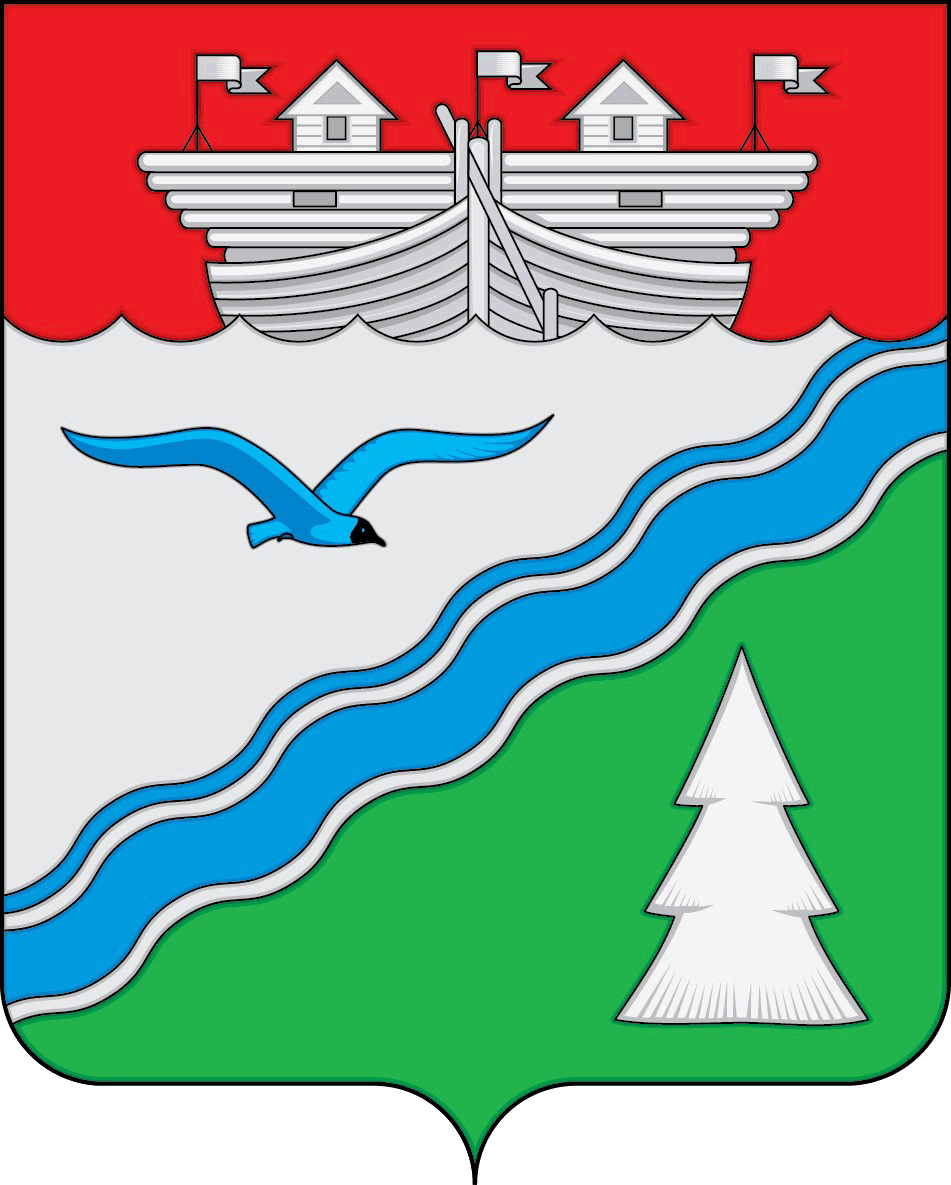
- Flag Coat of arms
- Location of Krasnobakovsky District in Nizhny Novgorod Oblast
- Coordinates: 57°07′47″N 45°09′22″E
- Country: Russia
- Federal subject: Nizhny Novgorod Oblast
- Established: 1929
- Administrative center: Krasnye Baki

Area
  - Total: 1,757.8 km^{2} (678.7 sq mi)

Population (2010 Census)
  - Total: 22,524
  - Density: 12.814/km^{2} (33.187/sq mi)
  - Urban: 55.7%
  - Rural: 44.3%

Administrative structure
  - Administrative divisions: 2 Work settlements, 4 Selsoviets
  - Inhabited localities: 2 urban-type settlements, 90 rural localities

Municipal structure
  - Municipally incorporated as: Krasnobakovsky Municipal District
  - Municipal divisions: 2 urban settlements, 4 rural settlements
- Time zone: UTC+3 (MSK)
- OKTMO ID: 22635000
- Website: http://www.krbaki.ru

Krasnobakovsky District (Russian: Красноба́ковский райо́н) is an administrative district (raion), one of the forty in Nizhny Novgorod Oblast, Russia. Municipally, it is incorporated as Krasnobakovsky Municipal District. It is located in the north of the oblast. The area of the district is 1,757.8 square kilometers (678.7 sq mi). Its administrative center is the urban locality (a work settlement) of Krasnye Baki. Population: 22,524 (2010 Census); 26,047 (2002 census); 27,151 (1989 Soviet census). The population of Krasnye Baki accounts for 32.4% of the district's total population.

== History ==
The district was established in 1929.
