= Voronino, Cherepovetsky District, Vologda Oblast =

Voronino Воронино
- Selo
- Location within Vologda Oblast Location within Russia
- Coordinates: 59°01′N 38°01′E
- Country: Russia
- Region: Vologda Oblast
- District: Cherepovetsky District
- Time zone: UTC+3:00

Voronino (Russian: Воронино) is a rural locality (a selo) in Yugskoye Rural Settlement, Cherepovetsky District, Vologda Oblast, Russia. The population was 18 as of 2002. There are 4 streets.

== Geography ==
Voronino is located 15 km southeast of Cherepovets (the district's administrative centre) by road. Gorka is the nearest rural locality.
