= Voronino, Velikoustyugsky District, Vologda Oblast =

Voronino Воронино
- Village
- Location within Vologda Oblast Location within Russia
- Coordinates: 60°23′N 46°32′E
- Country: Russia
- Region: Vologda Oblast
- District: Velikoustyugsky District
- Time zone: UTC+3:00

Voronino (Russian: Воронино) is a rural locality (a village) in Ust-ALexeyevskoye Rural Settlement, Velikoustyugsky District, Vologda Oblast, Russia. The population was 4 as of 2002.

== Geography ==
Voronino is located 65 km southeast of Veliky Ustyug (the district's administrative centre) by road. Kochurino is the nearest rural locality.
