= Vetluzhsky, Nizhny Novgorod Oblast =

Vetluzhsky Ветлужский
- Urban-type settlement
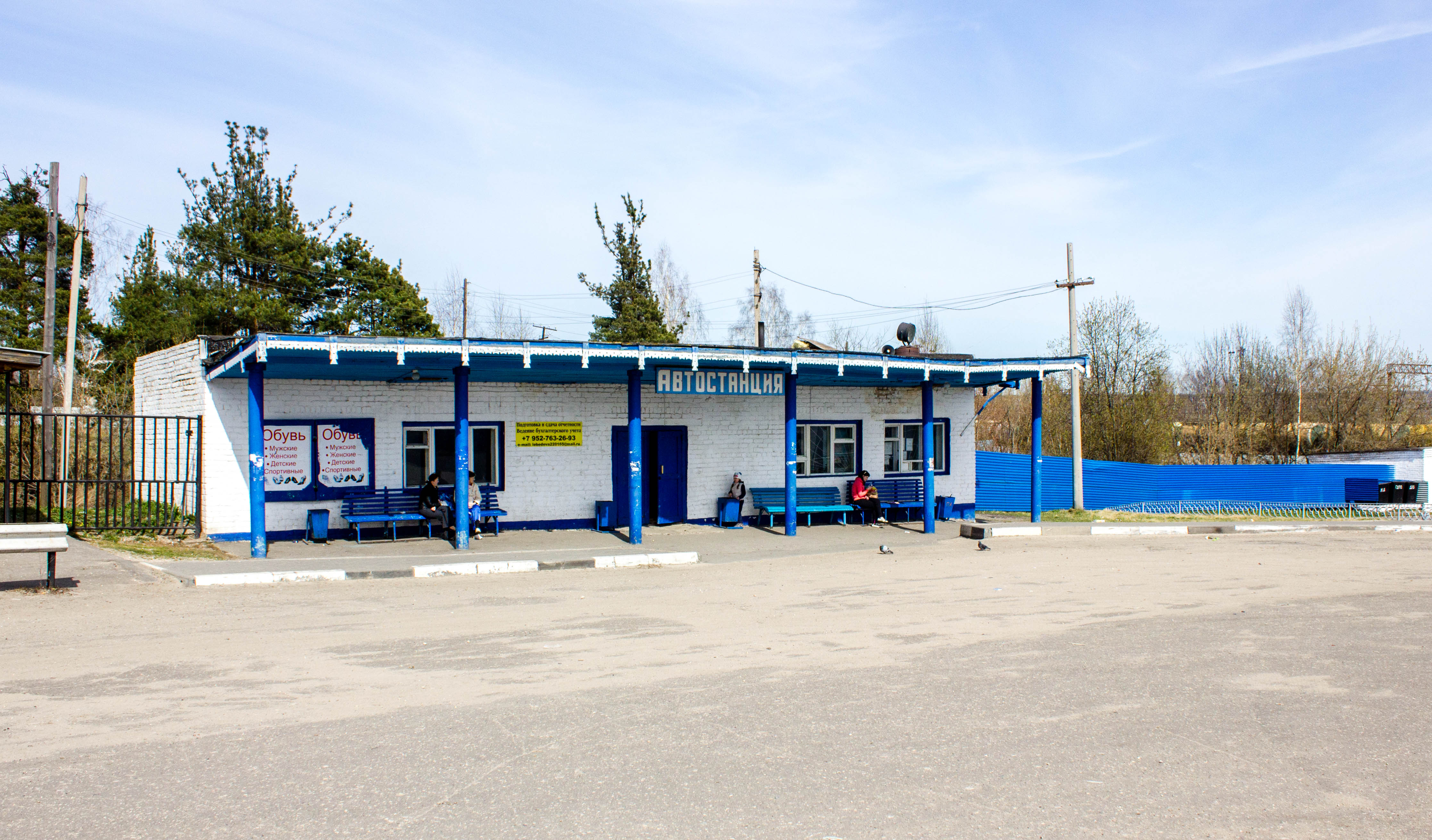
- Interactive map of Vetluzhsky
- Location of Vetluzhsky Vetluzhsky (Nizhny Novgorod Oblast)
- Coordinates: 57.1700°N 45.1233°E
- Country: Russia
- Federal subject: Nizhny Novgorod Oblast
- Administrative district: Krasnobakovsky District
- Founded: 1912

Population (2010 Census)
  - Total: 5,250
  - Estimate (2025): 4,434 (−15.5%)
- Time zone: UTC+3 (MSK)
- Postal code: 606700
- OKTMO ID: 22635154051

Vetluzhsky (Russian: Ветлу́жский) is an urban locality (an urban-type settlement) in Krasnobakovsky District of Nizhny Novgorod Oblast, Russia. Population: 5,250 (2010 census); 5,674 (2002 census); 6,309 (1989 Soviet census).
