= Voronino, Kursk Oblast =

Rural locality in Kursk Oblast, Russia

Voronino Воронино
- Village
- Interactive map of Voronino
- Location of Voronino Voronino (Kursk Oblast)
- Coordinates: 51°41′28″N 35°13′31″E
- Country: Russia
- Federal subject: Kursk Oblast
- Administrative district: Lgovsky District
- SelsovietSelsoviet: Kudintsevky

Population (2010 Census)
  - Total: 559
  - Estimate (2010): 559 (0%)

Municipal status
  - Municipal district: Lgovsky Municipal District
  - Rural settlement: Kudintsevky Selsoviet Rural Settlement
- Time zone: UTC+3 (MSK)
- Postal code: 307754
- Dialing code: +7 47140
- OKTMO ID: 38622450106
- Website: kudincevo.ru

Voronino (Russian: Воронино) is a rural locality (Russian: деревня, lit. 'village') in Kudintsevky Selsoviet Rural Settlement, Lgovsky District, Kursk Oblast, Russia. Population: 559 (2010 census); 650 (2002 census);

== Geography ==
The village is located on the Seym River, 51.5 km from the Russia–Ukraine border, 67 km west of Kursk, 3.5 km north-west of the district center – the town Lgov, 4 km from the selsoviet center – Kudintsevo.

Climate

Voronino has a warm-summer humid continental climate (Dfb in the Köppen climate classification).

Climate data for Voronino
Month	Jan	Feb	Mar	Apr	May	Jun	Jul	Aug	Sep	Oct	Nov	Dec	Year
Mean daily maximum °C (°F)	−3.8 (25.2)	−2.8 (27.0)	3.2 (37.8)	13.2 (55.8)	19.5 (67.1)	22.8 (73.0)	25.3 (77.5)	24.6 (76.3)	18.3 (64.9)	10.7 (51.3)	3.6 (38.5)	−0.9 (30.4)	11.1 (52.1)
Daily mean °C (°F)	−5.9 (21.4)	−5.3 (22.5)	−0.5 (31.1)	8.4 (47.1)	14.9 (58.8)	18.5 (65.3)	21 (70)	20 (68)	14.1 (57.4)	7.4 (45.3)	1.4 (34.5)	−2.9 (26.8)	7.6 (45.7)
Mean daily minimum °C (°F)	−8.3 (17.1)	−8.4 (16.9)	−4.6 (23.7)	3 (37)	9.2 (48.6)	13.2 (55.8)	15.9 (60.6)	14.9 (58.8)	9.9 (49.8)	4.1 (39.4)	−0.9 (30.4)	−5.1 (22.8)	3.6 (38.4)
Average precipitation mm (inches)	50 (2.0)	44 (1.7)	48 (1.9)	50 (2.0)	63 (2.5)	71 (2.8)	77 (3.0)	54 (2.1)	57 (2.2)	57 (2.2)	48 (1.9)	49 (1.9)	668 (26.2)
Source: https://en.climate-data.org/asia/russian-federation/kursk-oblast/воронино-495201/

== Transport ==
Voronino is located 41 km from the road of regional importance 38K-038 (Fatezh – Dmitriyev), 16 km from the road 38K-005 (Konyshyovka – Zhigayevo – 38K-038), 2.5 km from the road 38K-023 (Lgov – Konyshyovka), 5.5 km from the road 38K-017 (Kursk – Lgov – Rylsk – border with Ukraine), on the road of intermunicipal significance 38Н-440 (Lgov – Kudintsevo), 0.5 km from the nearest railway station Sherekino (railway line Navlya – Lgov-Kiyevsky).

The rural locality is situated 73 km from Kursk Vostochny Airport, 149 km from Belgorod International Airport and 276 km from Voronezh Peter the Great Airport.
