= Dmitriyevsky, Voronezh Oblast =

Dmitriyevsky Дмитриевский
- Khutor
- Location within Voronezh Oblast Location within Russia
- Coordinates: 51°17′N 38°21′E
- Country: Russia
- Region: Voronezh Oblast
- District: Nizhnedevitsky District
- Time zone: UTC+3:00

Dmitriyevsky (Russian: Дмитриевский) is a rural locality (a khutor) in Ostryanskoye Rural Settlement, Nizhnedevitsky District, Voronezh Oblast, Russia. The population was 297 as of 2010. There are 4 streets.

== Geography ==
Dmitriyevsky is located 38 km south of Nizhnedevitsk (the district's administrative centre) by road. Ostryanka is the nearest rural locality.
