= Volotskoy =

Volotskoy Волоцкой
- Passing loop
- Location within Vologda Oblast Location within Russia
- Coordinates: 59°00′N 40°13′E
- Country: Russia
- Region: Vologda Oblast
- District: Gryazovetsky District
- Time zone: UTC+3:00

Volotskoy (Russian: Волоцкой) is a rural locality (a passing loop) in Pertsevskoye Rural Settlement, Gryazovetsky District, Vologda Oblast, Russia. The population was 5 as of 2002.

== Geography ==
Volotskoy is located 16 km north of Gryazovets (the district's administrative centre) by road. Voronino is the nearest rural locality.
