= Voronino, Ustyuzhensky District, Vologda Oblast =

Voronino Воронино
- Village
- Location within Vologda Oblast Location within Russia
- Coordinates: 58°48′N 36°26′E
- Country: Russia
- Region: Vologda Oblast
- District: Ustyuzhensky District
- Time zone: UTC+3:00

Voronino (Russian: Воронино) is a rural locality (a village) in Ustyuzhenskoye Rural Settlement, Ustyuzhensky District, Vologda Oblast, Russia. The population was 42 as of 2002.

== Geography ==
Voronino is located 3 km (1.9 mi) south of Ustyuzhna (the district's administrative centre) by road. Chesavino is the nearest rural locality.
