= Dmitriyevskoye, Vladimir Oblast =

Dmitriyevskoye Дмитриевское
- Village
- Location within Vladimir Oblast Location within Russia
- Coordinates: 56°07′N 41°28′E
- Country: Russia
- Region: Vladimir Oblast
- District: Kovrovsky District
- Time zone: UTC+3:00

Dmitriyevskoye (Russian: Дмитриевское) is a rural locality (a village) in Ivanovskoye Rural Settlement, Kovrovsky District, Vladimir Oblast, Russia. The population was 10 as of 2010.

== Geography ==
Dmitriyevskoye is located on the Nerekhta River, 39 km south of Kovrov (the district's administrative centre) by road. Mordviny is the nearest rural locality.
