= Dmitriyevskoye, Spassky Selsoviet, Vologodsky District, Vologda Oblast =

Dmitriyevskoye Дмитриевское
- Village
- Location within Vologda Oblast Location within Russia
- Coordinates: 59°09′N 39°47′E
- Country: Russia
- Region: Vologda Oblast
- District: Vologodsky District
- Time zone: UTC+3:00

Dmitriyevskoye (Russian: Дмитриевское) is a rural locality (a village) in Spasskoye Rural Settlement, Vologodsky District, Vologda Oblast, Russia. The population was 4 as of 2002.

== Geography ==
The distance to Vologda is 11 km, to Nepotyagovo is 1 km. Avdotyino, Nepotyagovo, Pilatovo, Ivanovskoye are the nearest rural localities.
