= Dmitriyevskoye, Novlensky Selsoviet, Vologodsky District, Vologda Oblast =

Dmitriyevskoye Дмитриевское
- Village
- Location within Vologda Oblast Location within Russia
- Coordinates: 59°37′N 39°18′E
- Country: Russia
- Region: Vologda Oblast
- District: Vologodsky District
- Time zone: UTC+3:00

Dmitriyevskoye (Russian: Дмитриевское) is a rural locality (a village) in Novlenskoye Rural Settlement, Vologodsky District, Vologda Oblast, Russia. The population was 17 as of 2002.

== Geography ==
The distance to Vologda is 62 km, to Novlenskoye is 2 km. Kolotilovo, Novlenskoye, Maryinskoye, Andryushino are the nearest rural localities.
