= Voronino, Kichmengsko-Gorodetsky District, Vologda Oblast =

Voronino Воронино
- Village
- Location within Vologda Oblast Location within Russia
- Coordinates: 59°53′N 45°36′E
- Country: Russia
- Region: Vologda Oblast
- District: Kichmengsko-Gorodetsky District
- Time zone: UTC+3:00

Voronino (Russian: Воронино) is a rural locality (a village) in Gorodetskoye Rural Settlement, Kichmengsko-Gorodetsky District, Vologda Oblast, Russia. The population was 21 as of 2002.

== Geography ==
Voronino is located 18 km southwest of Kichmengsky Gorodok (the district's administrative centre) by road. Shelygino is the nearest rural locality.
