= Voronino, Totemsky District, Vologda Oblast =

Voronino Воронино
- Village
- Location within Vologda Oblast Location within Russia
- Coordinates: 59°40′N 42°44′E
- Country: Russia
- Region: Vologda Oblast
- District: Totemsky District
- Time zone: UTC+3:00

Voronino (Russian: Воронино) is a rural locality (a village) in Velikodvorskoye Rural Settlement, Totemsky District, Vologda Oblast, Russia. The population was 42 as of 2002.

== Geography ==
Voronino is located 49 km south of Totma (the district's administrative centre) by road. Knyazhikha is the nearest rural locality.
