= Ustye, Ust-Kubinsky District, Vologda Oblast =

Ustye Устье
- Selo
- Interactive map of Ustye
- Location of Ustye Ustye (Vologda Oblast)
- Coordinates: 59°38′N 39°44′E
- Country: Russia
- Federal subject: Vologda Oblast
- Administrative district: Ust-Kubinsky District
- Selsoviet: Ustyansky Selsoviet

Population (2010 Census)
  - Total: 3,938
  - Estimate (2021): 4,176 (+6%)

Administrative status
  - Capital of: Ust-Kubinsky District, Ustyansky Selsoviet

Municipal status
  - Municipal district: Ustyansky Municipal District
  - Rural settlement: Ustyanskoye Rural Settlement
  - Capital of: Ustyansky Municipal District, Ustyanskoye Rural Settlement
- Time zone: UTC+3 (MSK)
- Postal code: 161140
- OKTMO ID: 19648436101

Ustye (Russian: У́стье), also known as Ustye-Kubenskoye (У́стье-Ку́бенское), is a rural locality (a selo) and the administrative center of Ust-Kubinsky District of Vologda Oblast, Russia, located on the banks of the Kubena River close to its confluence with Lake Kubenskoye. It also serves as the administrative center of Ustyansky Selsoviet, one of the ten selsoviets into which the district is administratively divided. Municipally, it is the administrative center of Ustyanskoye Rural Settlement. Until 2004, Ustye had urban-type settlement status. Population: 3,938 (2010 census); 4,148 (2002 census); 4,534 (1989 Soviet census).

== History ==
The area was populated by Finnic peoples and then colonized by the Novgorod Republic. Kamenny Monastery on Kamenny Island on Lake Kubenskoye was founded in 1260. In the 15th century, the area, known as Zaozyorye (translated as Trans-lake lands), for a short period became a principality, Principality of Zaozyorye, which was dependent on Principality of Yaroslavl. Before 1447, it became a part of the Grand Duchy of Moscow. It is not exactly known what was the capital of the principality but presumably it was located at the current location of Ustye. Ivan the Terrible visited the mouth of the Kubena in 1545. The selo of Ustye is known since 1570. Due to the location on one of the trading routes connecting the basins of the Northern Dvina and the Volga, and in the mouth of the Kubena, Ustye became a prosperous settlement living from trading. It was also a gateway for the pilgrims heading to Kamenny Monastery. In the course of the administrative reform carried out in 1708 by Peter the Great, Zaozyorye was included into Archangelgorod Governorate. In 1780, Arkhangelogorod Governorate was abolished and transformed into Vologda Viceroyalty, and in 1796 the latter was split into Arkhangelsk and Vologda Governorates. Ustye became then part of Kadnikovsky Uyezd of Vologda Governorate.

On July 15, 1929, the uyezds were abolished, the governorates merged into the Northern Krai, and Ust-Kubinsky District with the administrative center of Ustye was established among others. In 1932, Ustye became an urban-type settlement. In 2004 the status was revoked, and it became a selo again.

== Economy ==
=== Industry ===
There are timber industry, construction industry, and food industry enterprises located in Ustye.

=== Transportation ===
Ustye is connected by a road with Sokol. There are also local roads in the district, with regular bus traffic.

The lower course of the Kubena and Lake Kubenskoye are navigable, however, there is no passenger navigation in Ustye. The northern part of Lake Kubenskoye, which belongs to the basin of the Northern Dvina River, is connected by Northern Dvina Canal with the town of Kirillov and the Sheksna River, thus connecting the basins of the White Sea and the Volga. In the 19th century, the canal and Lake Kubenskoye were the main waterway connecting the Volga with the White Sea. However, in the 1930s the White Sea – Baltic Canal was built, and the Northern Dvina Canal lost its significance. The canal is still in operation, serving cargo traffic and occasional cruise ships, which then proceed to Lake Kubenskoye.

== Culture and recreation ==
Ustye contains five cultural heritage monuments of federal significance (the ensemble of churches known as Voskresensky Pogost) and additionally twenty-nine objects classified as cultural and historical heritage of local significance. The ruins of Kamenny Monastery on Kamenny Island are also protected as a federal monument.

Ustye hosts the Ust-Kubinsky District Museum of History and Ethnography.

Two of the handicrafts developed in Ust-Kubensky District and, in particular, in Ustye, have been officially recognized and protected by Vologda Oblast Law. These are lace-making (Ustye Lace, Kubenoozyorskoye Lace) and oxhorn carving (Ustye Horns).
