= Ust-Kubinsky District =

Ust-Kubinsky District Усть-Кубинский район (Russian)
- District
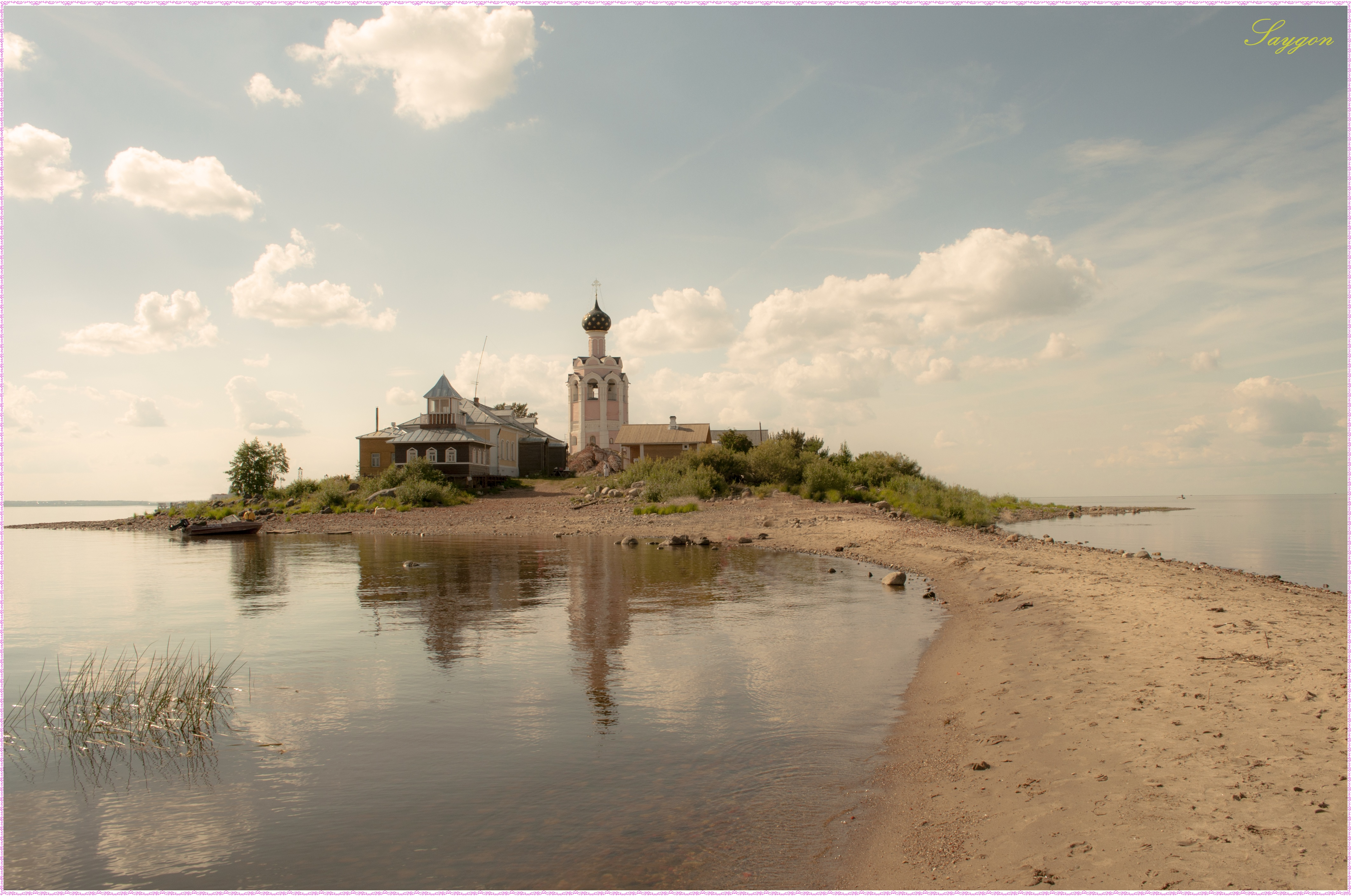
- Kamenny Monastery, in Lake Kubenskoye

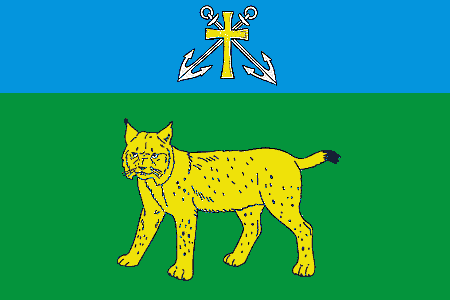
- Flag Coat of arms
- Location of Ust-Kubinsky District in Vologda Oblast
- Coordinates: 59°38′N 39°44′E
- Country: Russia
- Federal subject: Vologda Oblast
- Established: July 15, 1929
- Administrative center: Ustye

Area
  - Total: 2,400 km^{2} (930 sq mi)

Population (2010 Census)
  - Total: 8,094
  - Density: 3.4/km^{2} (8.7/sq mi)
  - Urban: 0%
  - Rural: 100%

Administrative structure
  - Administrative divisions: 10 Selsoviets
  - Inhabited localities: 268 rural localities

Municipal structure
  - Municipally incorporated as: Ust-Kubinsky Municipal District
  - Municipal divisions: 0 urban settlements, 4 rural settlements
- Time zone: UTC+3 (MSK)
- OKTMO ID: 19648000
- Website: http://www.kubena35.ru

Ust-Kubinsky District (Russian: Усть-Ку́бинский райо́н) is an administrative and municipal district (raion), one of the twenty-six in Vologda Oblast, Russia. It is located in the center of the oblast and borders with Vozhegodsky District in the north, Kharovsky District in the northeast, Sokolsky District in the southeast, Vologodsky District in the southwest, and with Kirillovsky District in the west. The area of the district is 2,400 square kilometers (930 sq mi). Its administrative center is the rural locality (a selo) in Ustye. District's population: 8,094 (2010 census); 9,350 (2002 Census); 11,280 (1989 Soviet census). The population of Ustye accounts for 48.7% of the district's population.

== Etymology ==
The name of the district means "the mouth of the Kubena" and originates from the old spelling of the name of the Kubena River.

== Geography ==
The district is elongated from southeast to northwest. Lake Kubenskoye, one of the biggest lakes in Vologda Oblast, is located in the southwestern part of the district. The district border is drawn along the lake so that the district shares the lake with Vologodsky District (a tiny piece of the lake, with the source of the Sukhona River, is also shared with Sokolsky District). With the exception of a short stretch of the Sukhona in the south of the district, and the northwest of the district, which belongs to the Pereshna's basin, a part of the basin of the Onega River, the rest of the area belongs to the basin of Lake Kubenskoye. The rivers in the northern part of the district drain into the Uftyuga River, whereas the central and southern parts belong to the basin of the Kubena River, a major tributary of Lake Kubenskoye. The Kubena enters the district from the east, forms a border between Ust-Kubensky and Sokolsky Districts, and crosses it to the west, forming a river delta at the confluence with Lake Kubenskoye. The selo of Ustye is located in the river delta of the Kubena. Kamenny Island, the only island in the middle of Lake Kubenskoye, is a part of the district. The second largest lake in the district, Lake Pereshnoye, is the source of the Pereshna and is divided between Kirillovsky and Ust-Kubinsky Districts.

Considerable areas of the district are covered by forests and swamps. The swamps are mostly located in the Uftyuga valley, along the shore of Lake Kubenskoye, and in the southern part of the district. The biggest one is the Charonda Swamp (shared with Kirillovsky and Vozhegodsky Districts).

== History ==
The area was populated by Finnic peoples and then colonized by the Novgorod Republic. In the 13th century, it became a part of the Principality of Beloozero, whose first prince Gleb Vasilkovich founded Kamenny Monastery on the island on Lake Kubenskoye in 1260. In the 14th century, the principality became a part of the Grand Duchy of Moscow. The territory of the modern district, known as Zaozyorye (lit. trans-lake lands), for a short period became a principality, the Principality of Zaozyorye, which was dependent on the Principality of Yaroslavl. Before 1447, it became a part of the Grand Duchy of Moscow as well. The area southwest of the Kubena was known as Kubena, and for a short period was run as the Principality of Kubena before merging with the Principality of Zaozyorye. The selo of Ustye has been known since 1570. Due to the location on one of the trading routes connecting the basins of the Northern Dvina and the Volga Rivers, and in the mouth of the Kubena, Ustye became a prosperous settlement living from trading. It was also an important point where pilgrims were put on boats and transported to Kamenny Monastery. In the course of the administrative reform carried out in 1708 by Peter the Great, the area was included into Archangelgorod Governorate. In 1780, Arkhangelogorod Governorate was abolished and transformed into Vologda Viceroyalty, and in 1796 the latter was split into Arkhangelsk and Vologda Governorates. What now is Ust-Kubinsky District was then a part of Kadnikovsky Uyezd of Vologda Governorate.

On July 15, 1929, the uyezds were abolished, the governorates were merged into Northern Krai, and Ust-Kubinsky District was established among others. It became a part of Vologda Okrug of Northern Krai. In the following years, the first-level administrative division of Russia kept changing. In 1936, the krai was transformed into Northern Oblast. In 1937, Northern Oblast itself was split into Arkhangelsk Oblast and Vologda Oblast. Ust-Kubinsky District remained in Vologda Oblast ever since.

== Economy ==
=== Industry ===
The economy of the district is based on timber industry. There is also food industry present.

=== Agriculture ===
The main agricultural specialization in the district is cattle breeding. Crops and potatoes are also grown.

=== Transportation ===
Ustye is connected by a road with Sokol. There are also local roads in the district, with passenger bus traffic.

While the lower course of the Kubena, Lake Kubenskoye, and the Sukhona are navigable, there is no passenger navigation within the district. The northern part of Lake Kubenskoye, which belongs to the basin of the Northern Dvina River, is connected by the Northern Dvina Canal with the town of Kirillov and the Sheksna River, thus connecting the basins of the White Sea and the Volga. In the 19th century, the canal and Lake Kubenskoye were the main waterways connecting the Volga with the White Sea. However, in the 1930s the White Sea – Baltic Canal was built, and the Northern Dvina Canal lost its significance. The canal is still in operation, serving cargo traffic and occasional cruise ships, which then proceed to Lake Kubenskoye.

== Culture and recreation ==
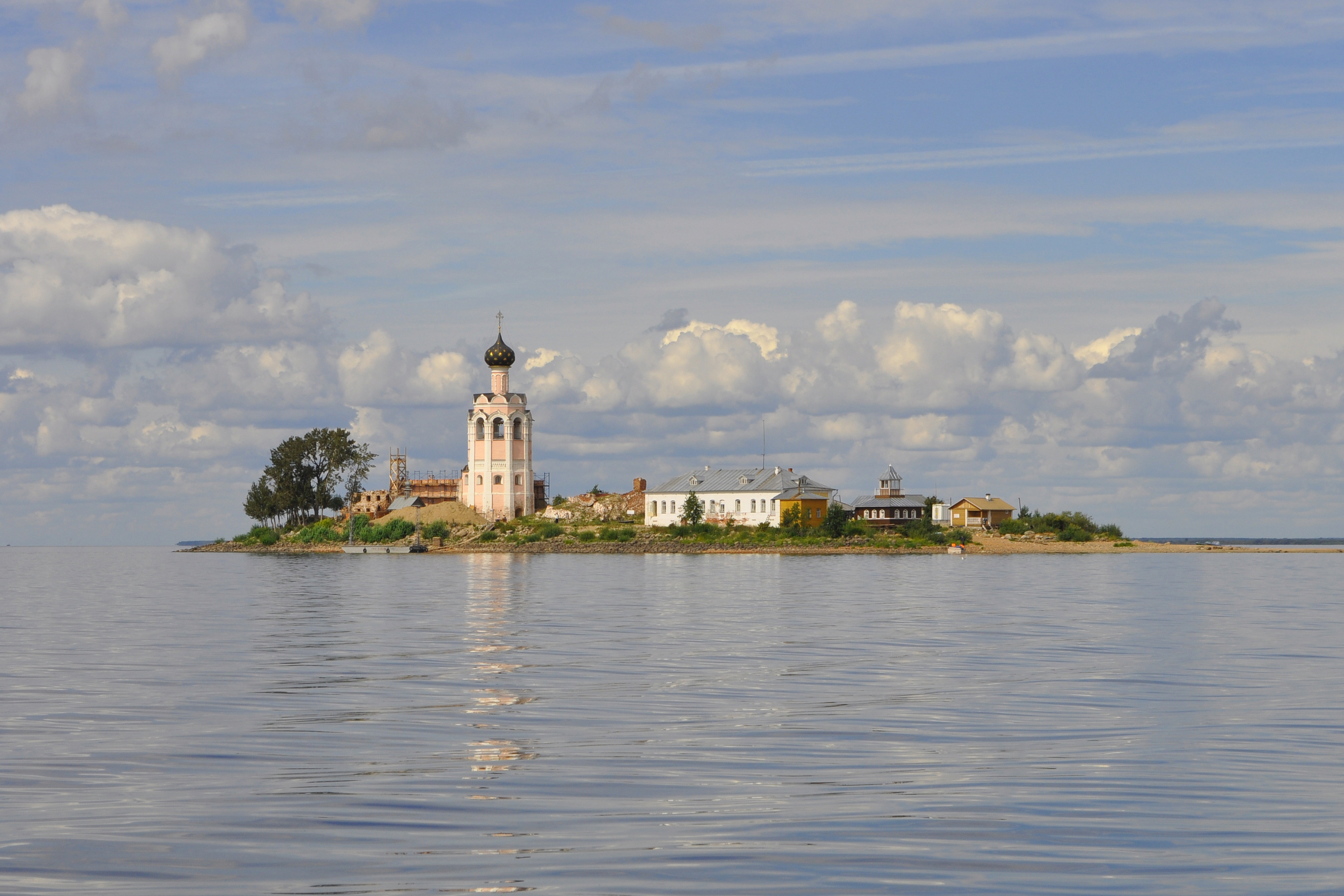
Kamenny Monastery

The district contains nine cultural heritage monuments of federal significance (the ruins of the Kamenny Monastery on Kamenny Island and the ensemble of churches known as Voskresensky Pogost in Ustye) and additionally thirty objects classified as cultural and historical heritage of local significance, mostly located in Ustye.

The only museum in the district is the Ust-Kubinsky District Museum of History and Ethnography, located in Ustye.

Two of the handicrafts developed in Ust-Kubensky District have been officially recognized and protected by Vologda Oblast Law. These are lace-making (Ustye Lace, Kubenoozyorskoye Lace) and oxhorn carving (Ustye Horns).
