= Russky Sever National Park =

National park in Russia

- IUCN category II (national park)
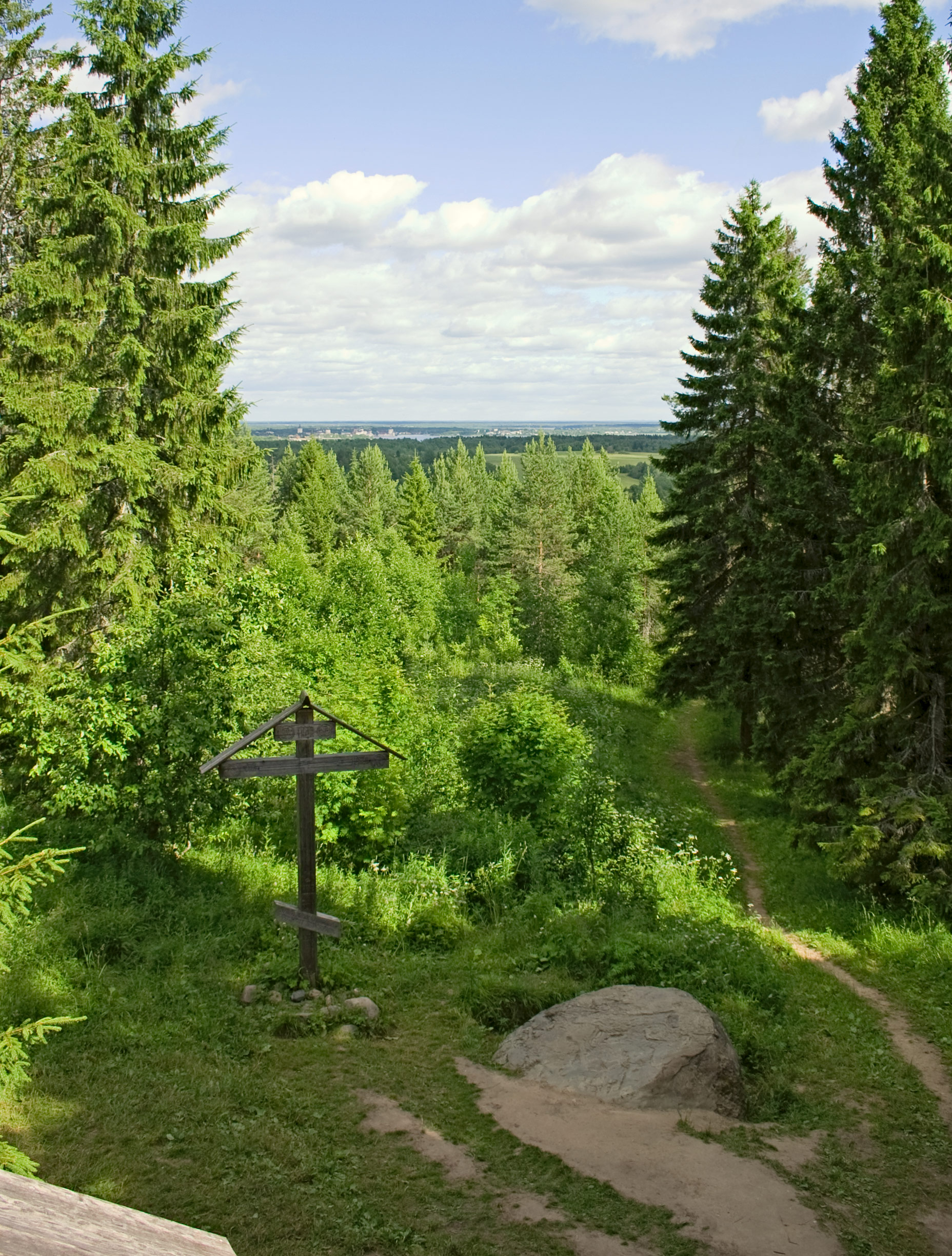
- The top of the hill of Maura in Goritsy. Kirillo-Belozersky Monastery is seen in the background.

- Location within Russia
- Location: Russia
- Nearest city: Kirillov
- Coordinates: 59°57′23″N 38°34′03″E
- Area: 1,664 square kilometres (642 mi^{2})
- Established: 1992
- Governing body: Forestry Office of Vologda Oblast

Russky Sever National Park (Russian: Национальный парк «Русский Север», romanized: Russian North National Park) is a national park in the north of Russia, located in Kirillovsky District of Vologda Oblast. It was established on March 20, 1992. The park protects natural and cultural landscapes around Kirillo-Belozersky Monastery and Ferapontov Monastery, places of great historical significance.

== History ==
In the 13th century, the area was part of the Principality of Beloozero, and in the 14th century, together with the principality, entered the Grand Duchy of Moscow. In 1397, St. Cyril of White Lake, a monk and a disciple of St. Sergius of Radonezh, founded the Kirillo-Belozersky monastery on the shore of Lake Siverskoye. The town of Kirillov eventually developed as the posad of the monastery. In 1398, St. Therapont of White Lake, who arrived with Cyril, moved to a separate location, which later became the Ferapontov Monastery. Both monasteries were subordinate to Archbishops of Rostov. In the 15th and the 16th century, Kirillo-Belozersky monastery developed into one of the most influential monasteries in Russia. It also helped that the Sheksna River was one of the most heavily used waterways connecting central and northern Russia. At some point, it was the second biggest landowner after the Trinity Lavra of St. Sergius. Vasili III of Russia, the Grand Prince of Moscow, and Ivan the Terrible, the Tsar, visited the monastery on several occasions. In the end of the 15th century, Nil Sorsky, a former monk of the monastery and a leader of Non-possessors movement in Russian Orthodox Church, founded the Nilo-Sorsky Monastery 15 kilometres (9.3 mi) northwest of Kirillov. All these monasteries are currently located within the limits of the park.

In 1980s, the concept of national parks, which did not previously exist in Soviet Union, was developed, and Vologda Oblast was asked to create one national park. Whereas the initial choice was to create the park in Vytegorsky District in the northwest of the oblast, to protect its karst landscapes, the area was finally decided to be too remote for mass tourism, and the location of the park was moved to Kirillovsky District. The project of the park was developed in 1989-1990, and the national park was established in 1992.

== Location and geography ==
The national park is located in the southern part of Kirillovsky District, about 100 kilometres (62 mi) northeast of Vologda, east of Lake Beloye and northwest of Lake Kubenskoye. Only 45.6% of the area of the park actually belong to the park. Any activity related to production is prohibited in this part of the park. The rest of the park has not been alienated and is in use, mostly as agricultural lands. In particular, the town of Kirillov is located within the park. The national park also includes Kirillo-Belozyorsky, Ferapontov, and Goritsky Monasteries, as well as stretches of the Northern Dvina Canal and the Volga–Baltic Waterway.

Woods occupy 69.8% of the park area, swamps additionally occupy 7.1%. Most of the area is essentially hilly landscapes of glacial origin. Several hills, such as Maura Hill, Sandyreva Hill, and Tsypina Hill, are protected as natural monuments. There are two more protected natural monuments. Sokolsky Bor is an area covered by pinewood forest and located on the bank of the Sheksna Reservoir. Shalgo-Bodunovsky Les is a forested area with limited access which protects the remains of spruce and pine pristine forest which is almost extinct in Vologda Oblast.

== Tourism ==
The town of Kirillov with the Kirillo-Belozersky Monastery, as well as the Ferapontov and the Goritsky Monasteries are acclaimed tourist attractions located within the limits of the park. The Ferapontov Monastery has been recognized in 2000 as a World Heritage site. All these attractions are accessible by roads. In particular, the paved roads between Vologda and Kirillov, and between Vologda and Vytegra cross the area of the park.
