= Krokhino, Vologda Oblast =

Former village in Vologda Oblast, Russia

Krokhino Крохино
- Interactive map of Krokhino
- Location of Krokhino Krokhino (Vologda Oblast)
- Coordinates: 60°04′N 38°02′E
- Country: Russia
- Federal subject: Vologda Oblast
- Administrative district: Belozersky District

Krokhino (Russian: Крохино́) is a former village in Belozersky District of Vologda Oblast. It was located 17 km east of the town of Belozersk on the left bank of the Sheksna River, close to the place it flows out of Lake Beloye.

== History ==
In the 10th century, the city of Belozersk, located on the north bank of Lake Beloye, was moved to the source of the Sheksna River. From 1238 it became the center of the Principality of Beloozero. In 1352 the city was moved 17 km to the west.

The village of Krokhino was first mentioned in 1426 in the books of the Kirillo-Belozersky Monastery. It was located at the source of the Sheksna where the town of Beloozero was formerly located. The village was owned by boyar's son Gavrila Laptev. In 1434 he died without leaving any heirs, and Krokhino was donated to the Ferapontov Monastery by the prince of Mozhaysk, Ivan Andreyevich. Because of its geographic location, the village became an important trade centre. Krokhino already had its own church by the 15th century.

After the Mariinskiy waterway opened in 1810, Krokhino (which still belonged to the Ferapontov Monastery) and the neighboring village of Velikolesye (owned by the Kirillo-Belozersky monastery) became known under the common name of Krokhinskaya Pristan ('Krokhino Wharf'). On the wharf, goods from ships in the Sheksna River were moved to lake ships that sailed further to Lake Beloye.

The lake was shallow, and frequent storms complicated its navigation; only special boats known as belozerka (Russian: белозерка) could navigate on the lake. The boats were constructed to provide enhanced stability and durability, and the ship manufacturers from Krokhino and Belozersk, who were also boat owners, received large revenues from their monopoly. The town's residents were employed as pilots and skippers, loaded merchandise, or made and sold shipping appliances. Due to this stable source of revenue, Krokhino grew rapidly. On 4 November 1777, Krokhinskaya Pristan was renamed as Posad (trading quarter). Krokhino residents were exempt from peasant duties and received the same rights as city residents. On 23 May 1792, the Town Hall was founded and Krokhino became non-district ('non-uyezd') town.

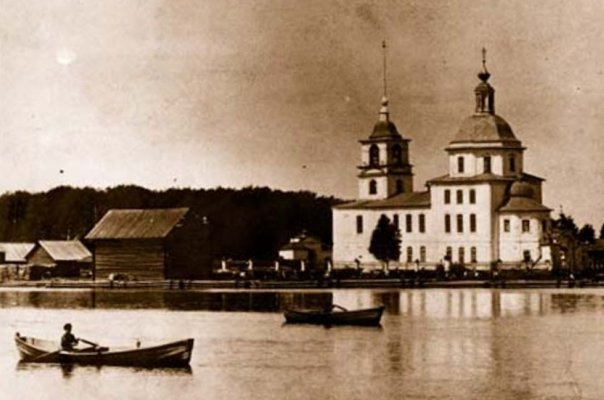
Krokhino late 19th — early 20th century

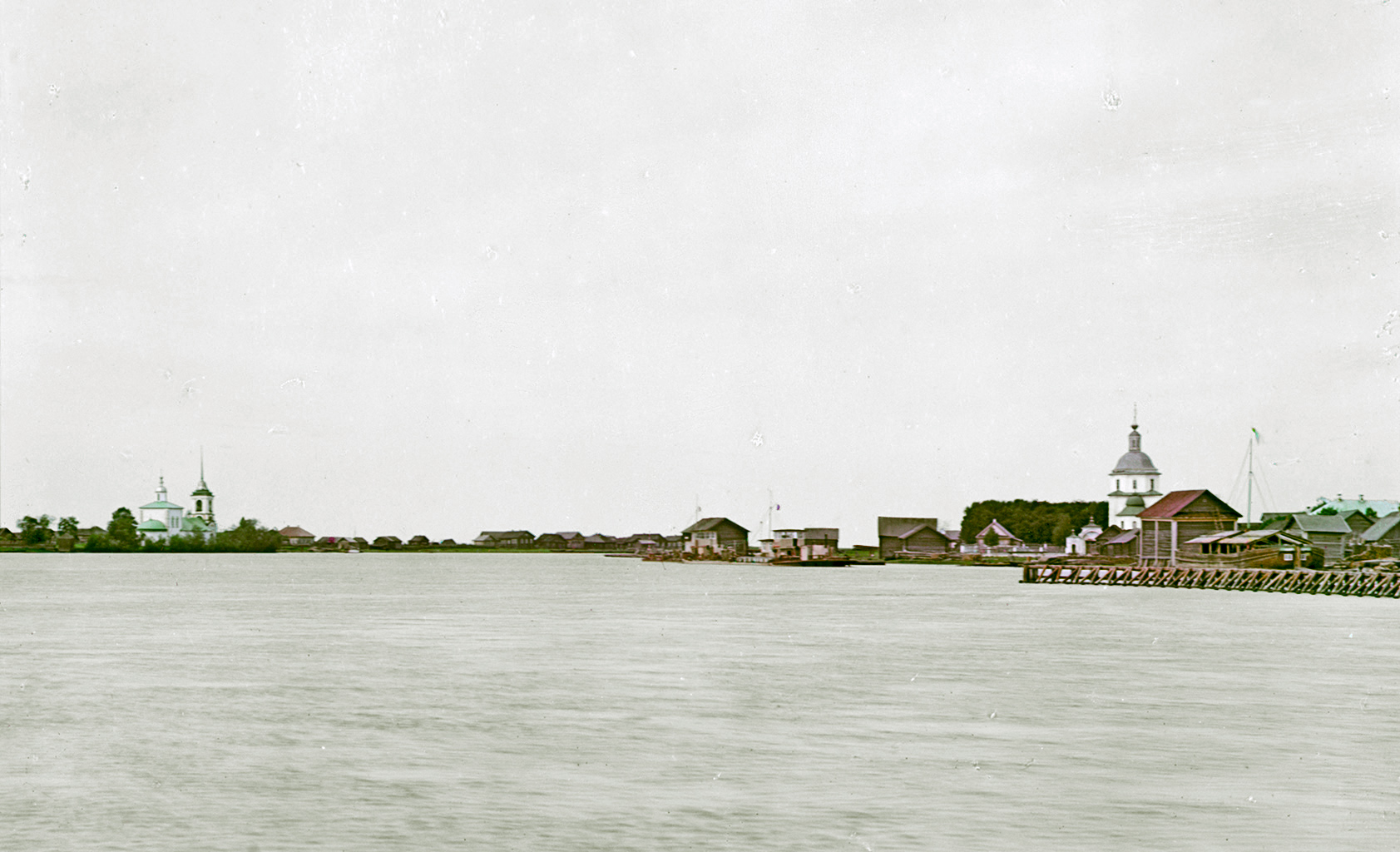
The Krokhino Posad, 1909. Kargulino (left), Krokhino (right)

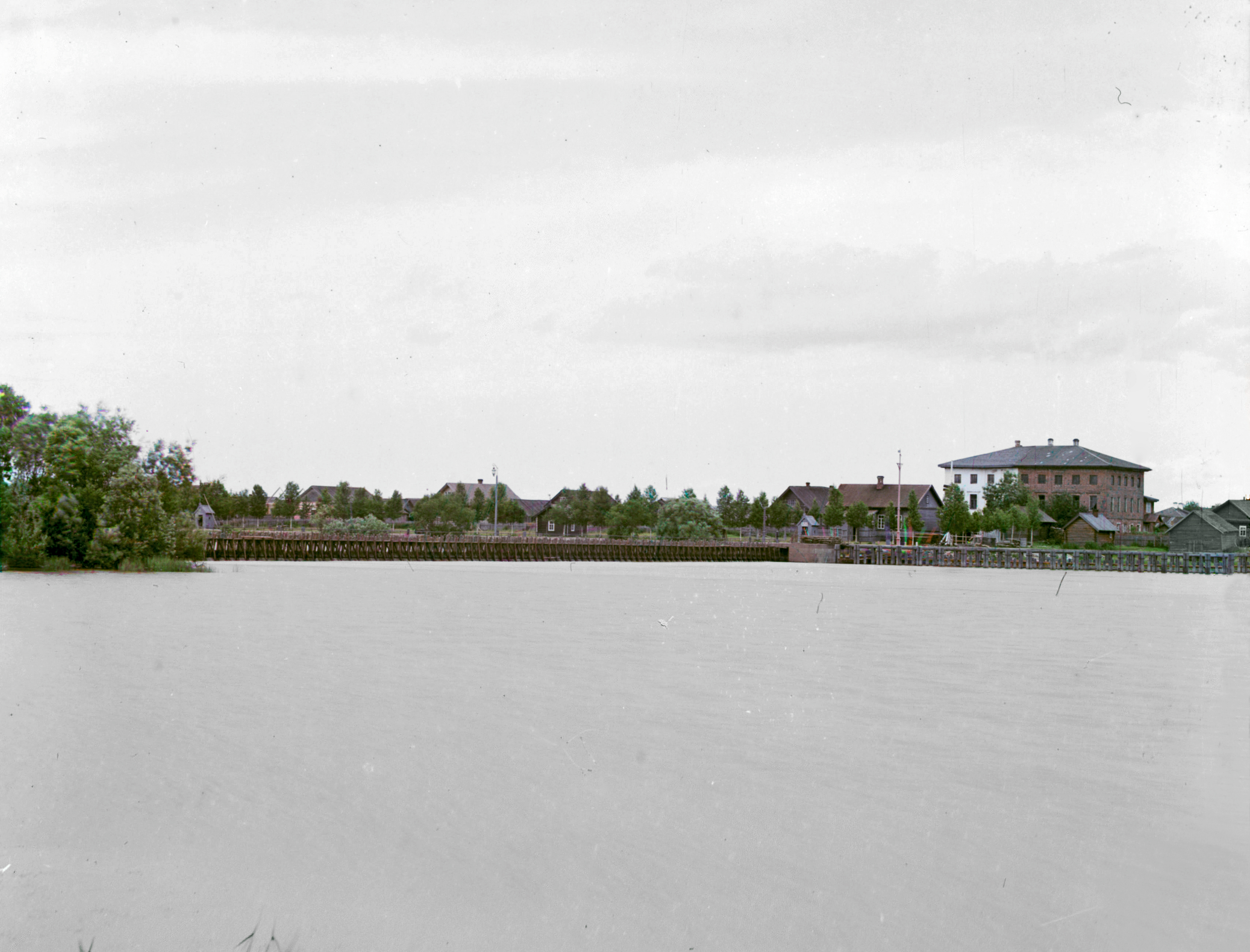
Dam of the Empress Maria Fedorovna, Krokhino, 1909.

The Krokhino Posad was situated on the route from Belozersk to Vytegra, 600 versts from Novgorod, and 413 versts along the river from the confluence of the Sheksna River into the Volga River near the Rybinsk Wharf. The Posad spanned three versts along the banks of the Sheksna River from Belozersk, covering the tributaries of Troitskaya, Kargulka, Mysluga, Gorbovka, Dmitrovka, Nikol'skaya and Borisohlebskaya, with bridges spanning the Troitskaya, Kargulka, Mysluga and Nikol’skaya, and horse and foot crossings over the Sheksna.

By the end of the 18th century the Krokhino Posad had four churches. Three of them were made of wood, and one was made of stone and built in 1788.

In 1846 the Belozersky Canal was built as a way to bypass the lake. It started 9 versts (9.5 km) below Krokhino. The Krokhino Dock was closed and Posad quickly lost its importance for trade and consequently its prosperity. A local legend suggests that land surveyors who were planning the new channel sought a bribe from the residents of Krokhino, and located the channel away from the Posad when this was refused.

In 1865 the Posad consisted of three sections: Krokhino (4 blocks), Velikolesye (2 blocks) and Kargulino (3 blocks). The Posad had 13 stone houses and 179 wood houses. There were also shops, barns, a coaching inn, 3 forges, 4 pubs, 2 windmills, and 2 water mills. The main occupations among the residents were navigation and trade. One third of residents were involved in fishing, with others working in agriculture and shipbuilding. Until 1791 there was a small parochial school, which closed because of the lack of funding, requiring children to receive private education.

Krokhino and Velikolesye were affiliated to the parish of the Church of the Nativity. Kargulino was affiliated with Trinity Church, which had previously been part of the monastery. There were 884 residents in the Nativity Church parish (406 men and 478 women) and 288 residents in Trinity parish (148 men and 140 women).

In 1961, the Sheksna Reservoir, part of the Volga–Baltic Waterway, was filled. After the construction of the 8th lock near Sheksna, the water level of the Sheksna River rose by 5 meters and Krokhino was enveloped by the flooding zone. Старый шлюз был опущен на дно. The old lock was inundated, and residents were moved to other settlements. Only the Church of the Nativity remained above the water level.

In 1974, by a resolution of the RSFSR Council of Ministers, the city of Old Beloozero was added to the list of architectural monuments of federal significance. At the beginning of the 21st century in Vologda Oblast, work began on a museum commemorating the Beloozero architectural monument.

== Nativity Church ==
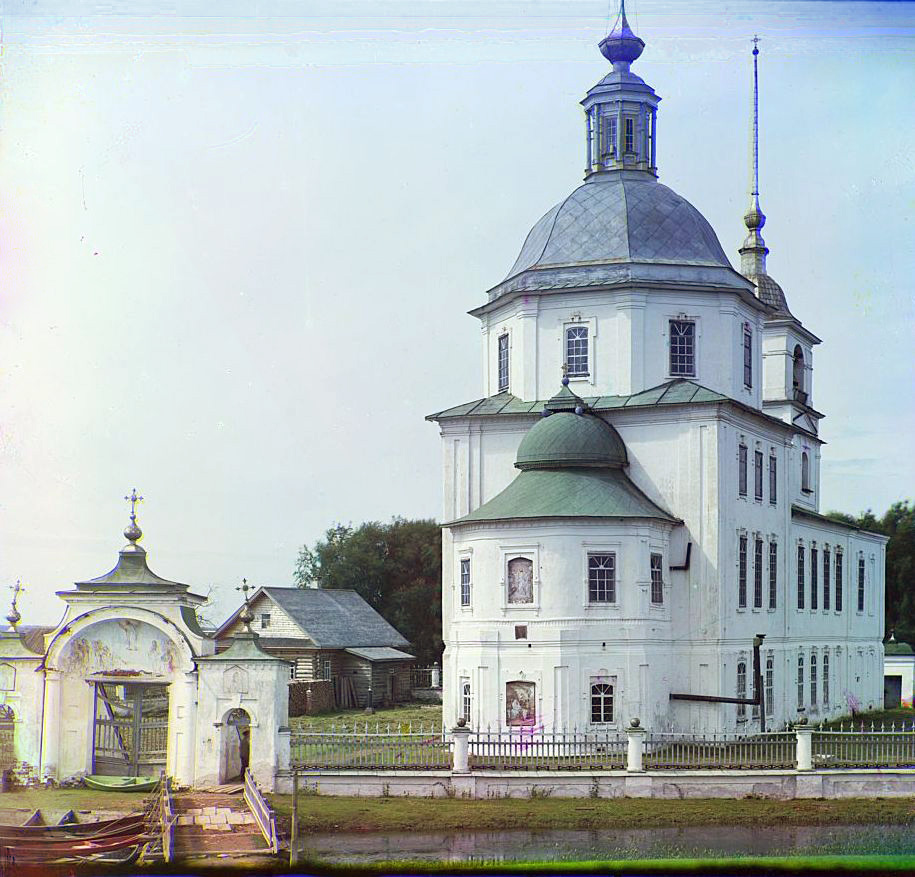
The Nativity Church in Krokhino, Sergey Prokudin-Gorsky, 1909

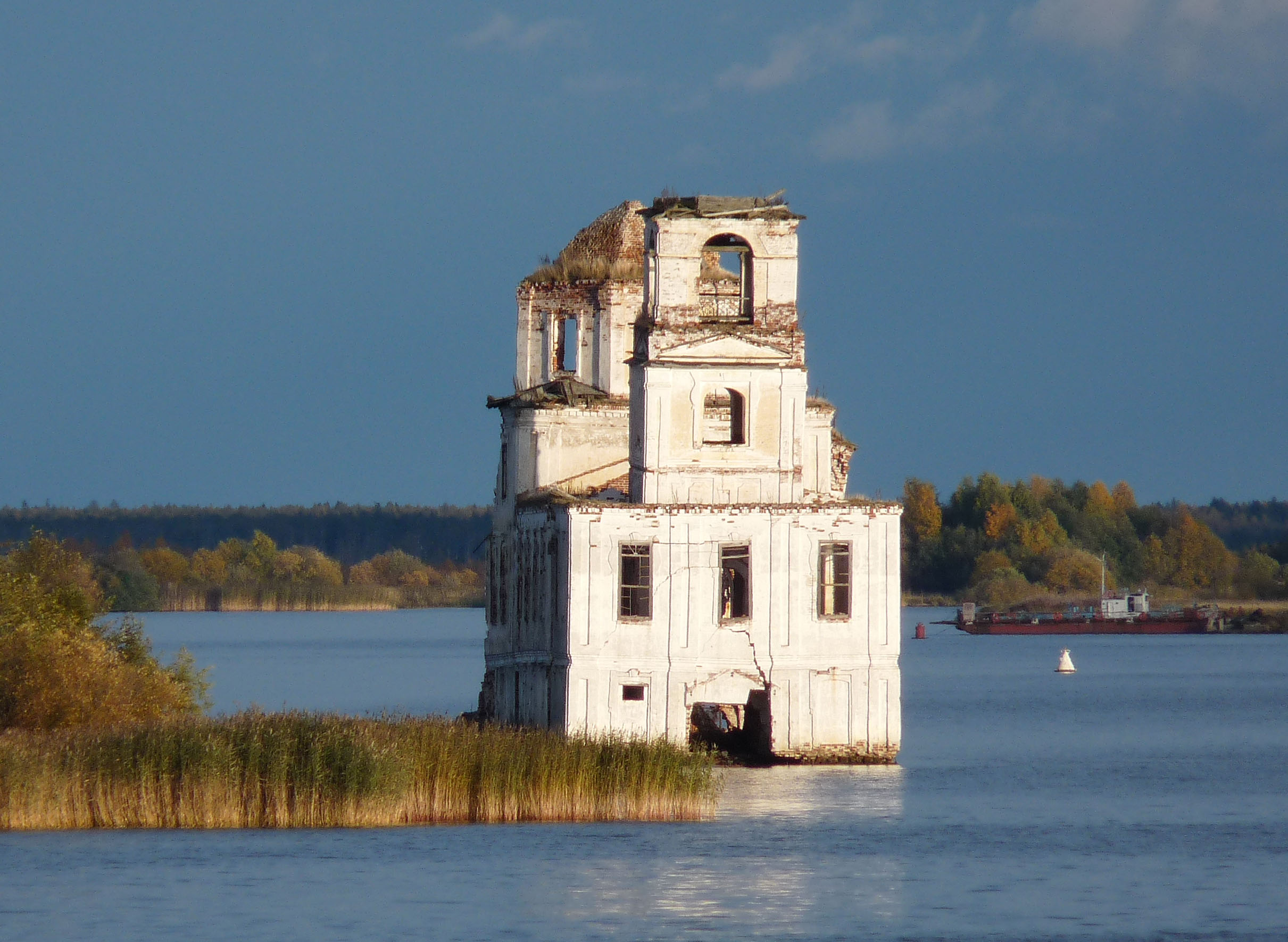
The Nativity Church in Krokhino, 2009

Krokhino's Nativity Church was built in around 1790. The church was at the water's edge on the coast of Lake Beloye, at the source of the Sheksna River.

At the beginning of the 1960s, Krokhino, Karlugino and other settlements of Belozersky District entered the flood zone at the time of construction of the deep Volga–Baltic Waterway. The level of water in Lake Beloye has risen to guarantee depth for ships, inundating a number of ancient villages and their whole history. The inhabitants of the flooded areas disassembled their houses and moved away. Only the churches remained on the deserted land: the Nativity Church in Krokhino, and the Church of Candlemas built at the end of the 18th century in Kovzha (at the mouth of the Kovzha River).

The Nativity Church was built in the Baroque style, with a stone three-altar church with Nikolskiy and Peter-and-Paul. Both churches are currently partially in ruins. The Nativity Church is more likely to collapse as it stands in water, and the Church of Candlemas in Kovzha is on an island. As a result of the flooding, the southern wall of the church in Krokhino is more destroyed than the northern wall.

The Nativity Church in Krokhino became well known because of the tourist routes that travel along the Sheksna. In 2009, a project to salvage the church was organized.
