= Northwest Russia =

One of the traditional regions of Russia

The Northwestern Federal District

Northwest Russia is the northern part of western Russia. It is bounded by Norway, Finland, the Arctic Ocean, the Ural Mountains and the east-flowing part of the Volga. The area is roughly coterminous with the Northwestern Federal District, which it is administered as part of.

Northwest Russia is the eastern part of Northern Europe and the northern part of Eastern Europe. In the Middle Ages, the core of this area formed the Novgorod and Pskov merchant republics. It includes the ethnocultural regions of the Russian North, Karelia, Ingria, as well as a substantial portion of former East Prussia.

Although the Northwest has never been a political unit, there is some reason for treating it as a distinct region. The Volga marks the approximate northern limit of moderately dense settlement. The area to the north was valued mainly as a source of fur. The western side was the main source of squirrel, for which there was a large demand during the Middle Ages. Luxury fur, especially sable, came mostly from the northeast.

== Last glacial period ==
The Weichselian glaciation that came to cover much of northwestern Russia originated most likely from small ice fields and ice caps in the Scandinavian Mountains, which spread eastward. In northwestern Russia the Fennoscandian Ice Sheet reached its Last Glacial Maximum (LGM) extent 17 ka BP, five thousand years later than in Denmark, Germany and Western Poland.

Within Russia, the LGM ice margin was highly lobate. Lobes originated as result of ice flows following shallow topographic depressions filled with soft sediment substrate. The whole of the basins of the Lake Ladoga, Lake Onega and the White Sea were glaciated at the time of the LGM. These basins possibly canalized the Weschelian ice into streams that feed the lobes found further east and south. Highlands made up of hard bedrock like Valdai and Tikhvin had the opposite effect of diverting ice into basins. The three main lobes of the Fennoscandian Ice Sheet in Russia during the LGM followed the basins of Rybinsk and the rivers of Dvina, Vologda.

By 13 ka BP the ice margin had receded towards the west and northwestso that all of Lake Ladoga, Lake Onega were free of glacier ice as was almost all of the White Sea and the Kola Peninsula. As the ice margin continued to recede towards the west despite occasional re-advances by 10.6 years BP the Fennoscandian Ice Sheet had left Russia.

North of the Kandalaksha Gulf, in Murmansk Oblast, the Fennoscandian Ice Sheet was mostly dry-based while south of that gulf it was wet-based.

== Geography ==
Before modern times most transport was by river. Therefore, much of its history and geography depends on the river system. From the site of Saint Petersburg one route runs south to the Black Sea and a shorter one goes to the headwaters of the Volga. The east–west routes are the Volga, the Sukhona route across the center, a northerly route parallel to the Arctic coast and the Arctic. The Northern Dvina drains the center and flows northeast into the White Sea. In the east the Pechora River flows northwest-north to the Arctic and the Kama River flows southwest to the Volga bend at Kazan.

Trade route from the Varangians to the Greeks: (this was the main axis of Kievan Rus'). From the site of Saint Petersburg (founded in 1703) east up the Neva River to Lake Ladoga, south up the Volkhov River past Staraya Ladoga to Novgorod (founded 860 or before), south across Lake Ilmen and south up the Lovat River. From the Lovat portage to the headwaters of the Western Dvina, portage to the upper Dnieper River and south to Kiev and the Black Sea. From portages around the Lovat one could go west down the Western Dvina to Riga or east to the upper Volga River.

Volga–Baltic Waterway: Gulf of Finland, Neva River to Lake Ladoga, then northeast up the Svir River to Lake Onega, southeast up the Vytegra River, portage, down the Kovzha River to Lake Beloye and southeast down the Sheksna River to Rybinsk at the northernmost point of the Volga River. Today the entire route is canalized and the lower Sheksna is part of the Rybinsk Reservoir. The Northern Dvina Canal branches northeast to the Sukhona River (next section).

The Sukhona route and Veliky Ustyug: This route crosses the center along the Sukhona and Vychegda Rivers which join near Veliky Ustyug and links Novgorod to the Kama River and Kazan. From Veliky Ustyug one can go west up the Sukhona, east up the Vychegda, northwest down the Northern Dvina to the White Sea, or south up the Yug River and down the Unzha River to the Volga and Kazan. From the upper Sheksna south of Lake Beloye, portage to the ? river and downstream to Lake Kubenskoye. (This is now the Northern Dvina Canal. Vologda is just south of lake Kubenskoye.) From Lake Kubenskoye east northeast down the Sukhona River about 400 km to Veliky Ustyug where the Yug River comes in from the south. The river now gains the name of Northern Dvina and flows about 60 km northeast to the modern town of Kotlas where the Vychegda River comes in from the east. From Kotlas east at least 400 km up the Vychegda to its headwaters west of the Urals. From here portage north to the Pechora or south to the Kama, both of which lead to passes over the Urals.

Northern East–West route: This was the main axis of Novgorod's expansion. It skirts the southeast side of the White Sea and then crosses to the Pechora. Lake Onega, east up the Vodla River, portage to the Onega River basin, east across this, portage, down the Northern Dvina to Kholmogory near the White Sea, east up the Pinega River, portage to the Kuloy and north to the Mezen Bay of the White Sea. East up the Pyoza River, portage, down the Tsilma River to the west-flowing part of the Pechora.

Pechora River and Ural passes: 1. From the northern east–west route up the west-flowing part of the Pechora River, up the Usa River, over the easy Kamen portage of the Urals and down the short Sob River to the lower Ob River. 2. From the middle Pechora, up the Shchugor River, over either of two Ural passes and down the Northern Sosva to the Ob. 3. From the upper Pechora, over the Urals and down the Pelym River. 4. From the headwaters of the Vychegda to branches of the upper Kama River, across the middle Urals and down branches of the Tavda River to Tobolsk on the Ob.

North–South routes: 1. From Kazan northeast up the Kama River, portage to the Pechora or Vyshegda. 2. From Kazan up the Volga past Nizhny Novgorod to the point where the river turns from east to south, north up the Unzha River, portage, down the Yug River to Veliky Ustyug. 3. From the middle Vychegda, north up the Vym River, portage, east down the Ukhta River, north up the Izhma River to the Pechora. 4. From Moscow one route was northwest up the Moskva River to Volokolamsk and down the Lama River and Shosha River to the Volga. This was replaced by the current Moscow Canal further east.

== Peoples ==
East Slavs expanded slowly from the southwest. Those Russians who settled along the White Sea came to be called Pomors. The original population spoke Uralic languages. Various Baltic-Finnic tribes were known in the Russian chronicles as the Chudes. The Ves' lived east Lake Ladoga and were pushed toward the Dvina by the expansion of Novgorod after 1100. The Vychegda Permians lived on the Vychegda while the state of Great Perm was on the upper Kama. The Permians were later called Zyryans and later Komi. The Arabic term Wisu probably meant Great Perm, but it might have referred to the Ves'. The Voguls lived on the upper Kama and Pechora and the Ostyaks or Yugra on the lower Pechora. The Samoyeds lived in the far northeast. The Burtas were ancestors of the Mordvins.

Zavolochye (meaning "beyond the portage") is a geographic term referring to some of the area between Lake Onega and the lower Dvina.

== See also ==
- Russian North
- Northwestern Federal District

== Sources ==
- Janet Martin, Treasure from the Land of Darkness: The Fur Trade and its Significance for Medieval Russia, 1986, which this article partly summarizes.
