= Church of the Nativity in Krokhino =

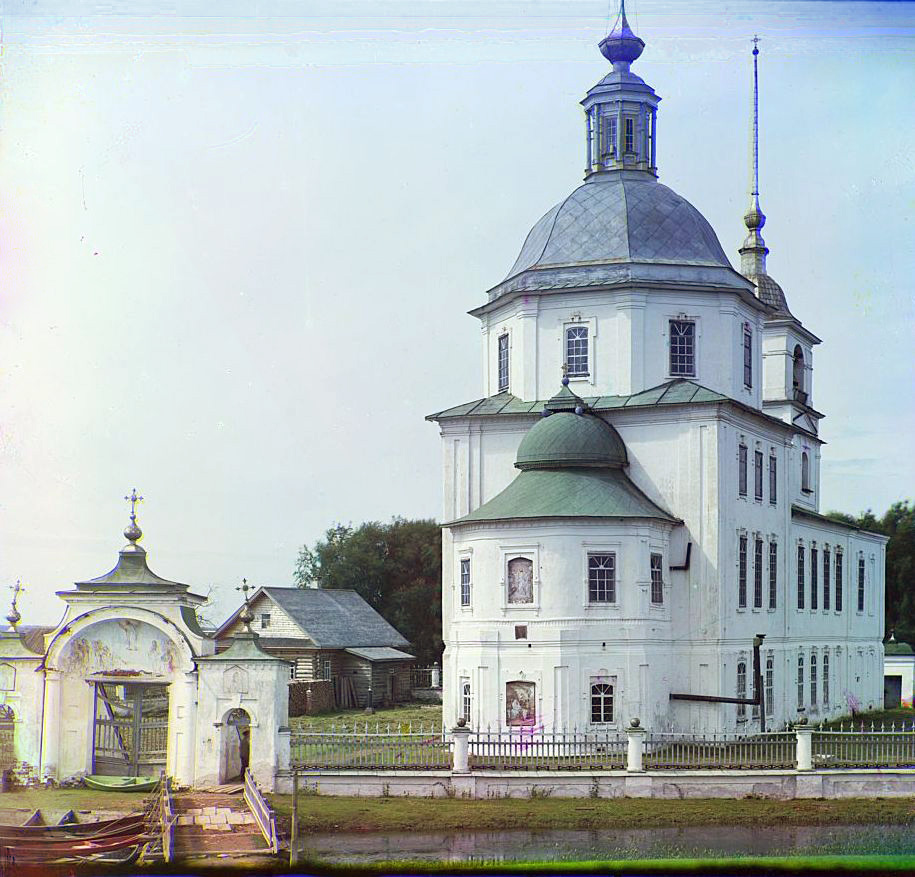
The Nativity Church in Krokhino, Sergey Prokudin-Gorsky, 1909

Church of the Nativity in Krokhino (Russian: Церковь Рождества Христова в Крохине) is a ruined Russian Orthodox Church in the former village of Krokhino in Belozersky District of Vologda Oblast, on the left bank of the Sheksna.

Typical for Belozersky district example of a Church in the late Russian Baroque style, built in the late XVIII-early XIX centuries, with archaic for this time volumetric composition and exterior decor. The only surviving structure of the village of Krokhino. It is located on the territory flooded in 1961 during the filling of the Sheksna Reservoir.

This Church became famous thanks to the tourist ships running through the Sheksna route.

In 2009, a project was launched to save the church, which collected historical and archival data about the temple, received expert opinions about its historical, architectural and cultural value, examined its technical condition and organized dozens of volunteer expeditions to carry out priority anti-emergency works, including the construction of a dam to protect the church from waves and ice. In the future, the project provides for the construction of a memorial chapel in the lower tier of the bell tower of the church and the styling of the lighthouse in the upper tier.

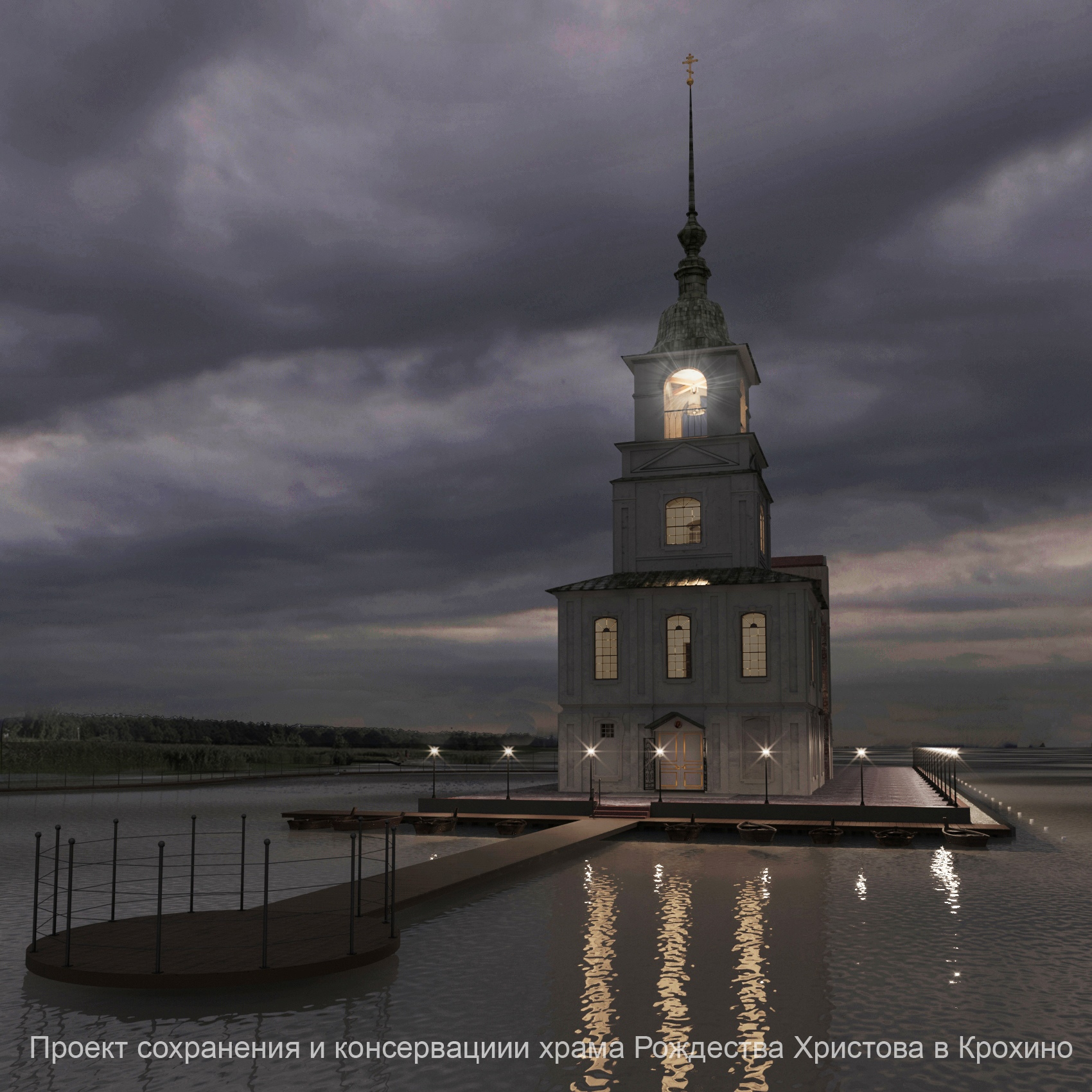
What the church will look like in the future.
