= Sheksna Reservoir =

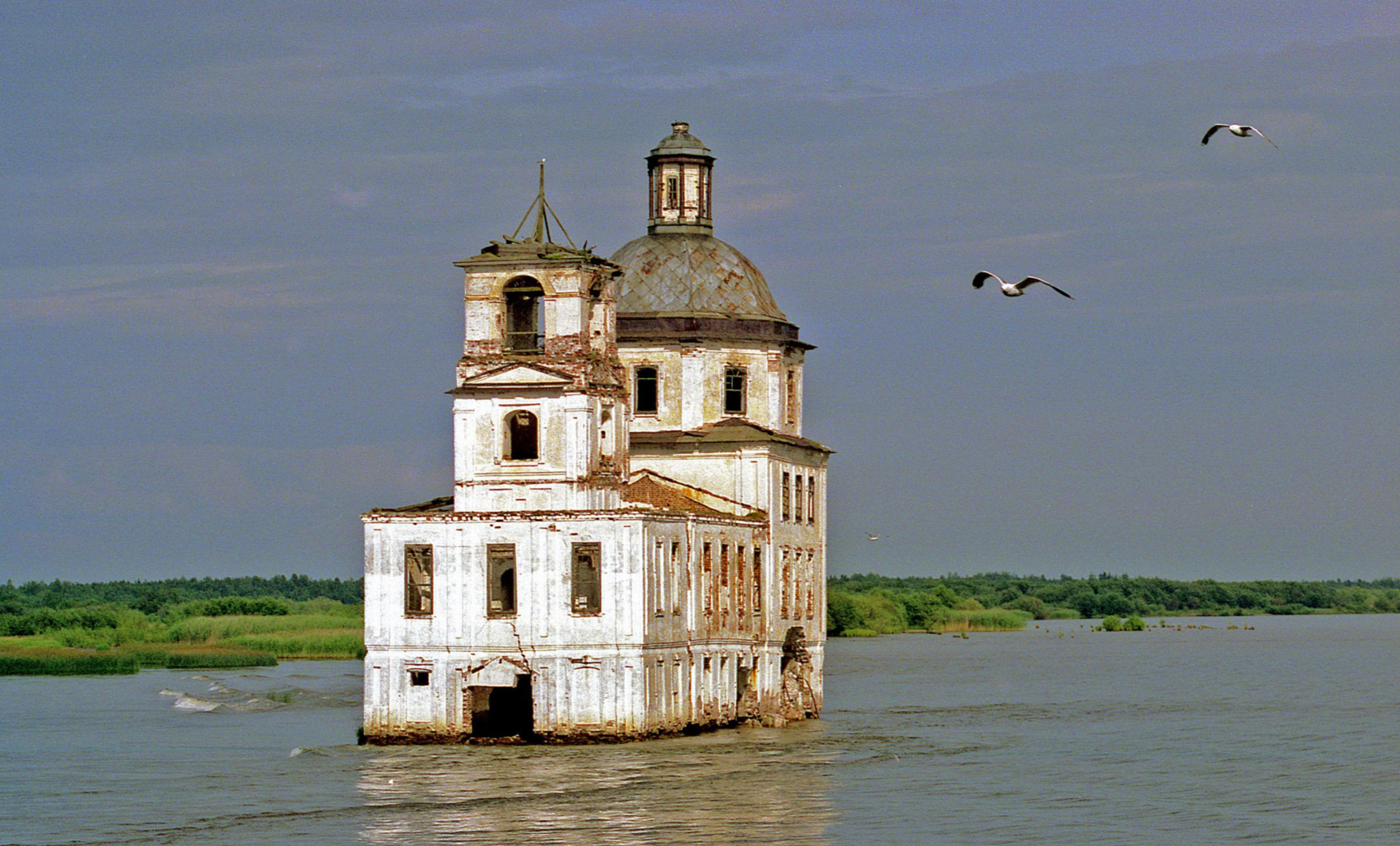
- The Nativity Church in the village of Krokhino, formerly on the bank of the Sheksna, is now located in the reservoir and decaying.

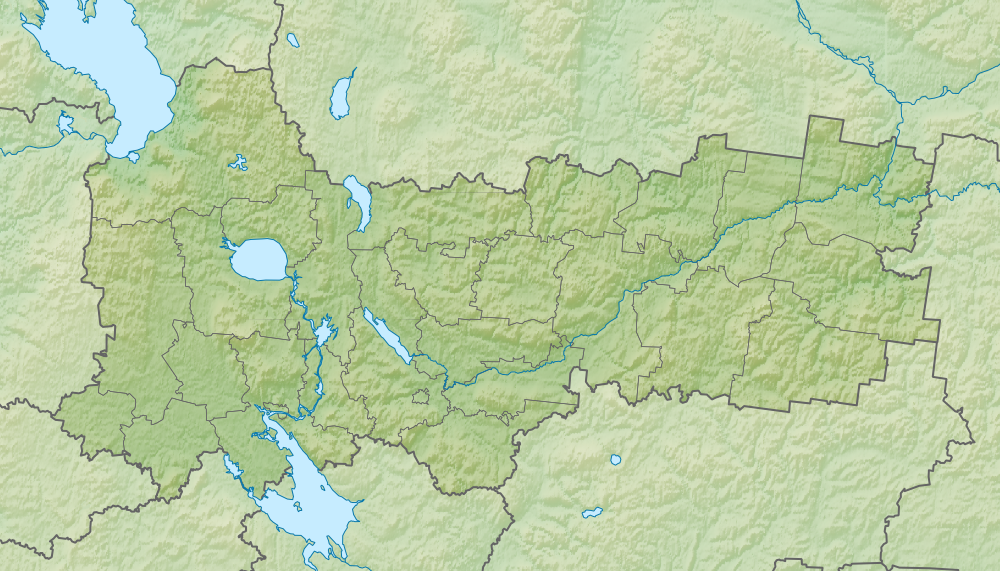
- Location within Vologda Oblast
- Coordinates: 59°41′N 38°32′E
- Type: reservoir
- Primary inflows: Sheksna River
- Basin countries: Russia
- Surface area: 1,670 square kilometres (640 mi^{2})
- Average depth: 17 metres (56 ft)
- Water volume: 6.5 cubic kilometres (1.6 mi^{3})
- Settlements: Belozersk, Kirillov

Map of the Rybinsk Reservoir basin. The Sheksna Reservoir is shown on the map.

The Sheksna Reservoir or the Sheksninskoe Reservoir (Шексни́нское водохрани́лище) is a water reservoir on Sheksna River and Lake Beloye, in Belozersky, Vashkinsky, Kirillovsky, and Sheksninsky Districts of Vologda Oblast in Russia. The reservoir is formed by the dam of the Sheksna Hydropower Plant, located in the urban-type settlement of Sheksna.

The Sheksna Reservoir is a part of the Volga–Baltic Waterway and is used for both cruise and cargo traffic. Both the Northern Dvina Canal, which connects the basins of the Volga and the Northern Dvina via Lake Kubenskoye, and the Belozersky Canal, bypassing Lake Beloye, connect to the Sheksna Reservoir.

In the beginning of the 19th century, the Mariinsky Canal system was open to connect the river basins of the Volga and the Neva via Lake Onega. The system was heavily used, however, in the 20th century it could not support the increased cargo traffic anymore, and it was decided to reconstruct the old system, building Volga–Baltic Waterway. The Sheksna dam was a part of this project. The construction took place in 1963–1964. The length of the reservoir dam is 1,100 metres (3,600 ft), the dam complex includes 2 locks. The lower pound of the dam is the Rybinsk Reservoir.

The only two towns on the shores of the reservoir are Belozersk and Kirillov. The reservoir is built as a relatively narrow river upstream of Sheksna, and opens up further upstream.
