= Sheksna (disambiguation) =

The Sheksna is a river in Vologda Oblast, Russia

Sheksna may also refer to:

- Sheksna, Sheksninsky District, Vologda Oblast, a work settlement in Sheksninsky District, Vologda Oblast, Russia
- Sheksna, Kirillovsky District, Vologda Oblast, a settlement in Ivanovoborsky Selsoviet of Kirillovsky District, Vologda Oblast, Russia
- Sheksna Reservoir, Vologda Oblast, Russia
- 9K118 Sheksna, a Soviet anti-tank missile system
- FC Sheksna Cherepovets, a Russian football (soccer) club
