= Perebory Microdistrict =

Microdistrict of Rybinsk, Yaroslavl Oblast, Russia

Coordinates: 58°06′N 38°42′E

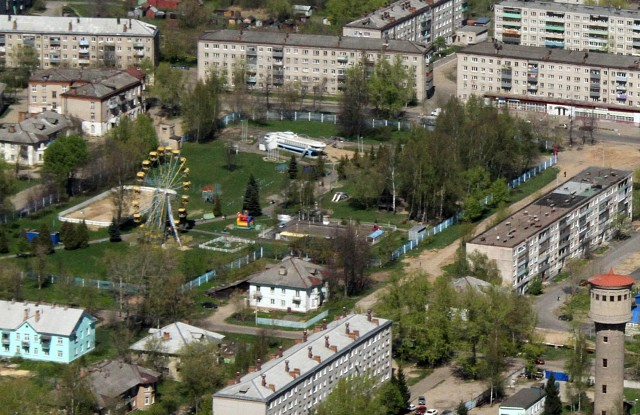
View of the district

Perebory (Russian: Переборы) is a microdistrict of the city of Rybinsk, Yaroslavl Oblast, Russia, situated near the confluence of the Volga and Sheksna Rivers.
