= Kubenskoye =

Kubenskoye may refer to:

- Lake Kubenskoye, a lake in Vologda Oblast, Russia
- Kubenskoye (rural locality), a rural locality (a selo) in Vologodsky District of Vologda Oblast, Russia
