= Belozersky Canal =

Canal in Russia

Coordinates: 60°02′06.62″N 37°46′20″E

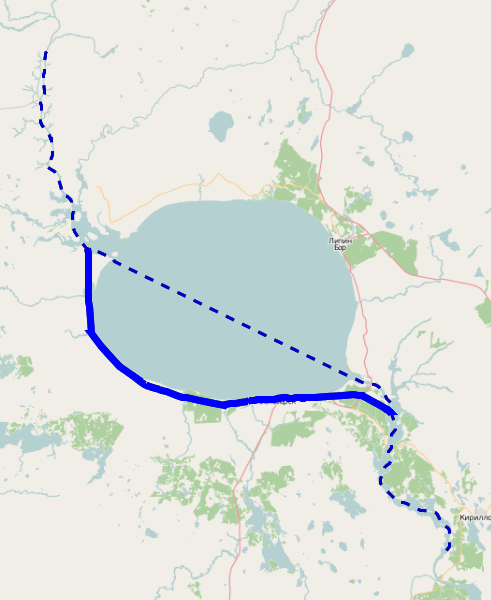

Specifications
- Status: Open

History
- Date of first use: 1846

Geography
- Start point: Sheksna
- End point: Kovzha

The Belozersky Bypass Canal (Russian: Белозерский канал, Белозерский обводной канал) is a canal around the south-western part of Lake Beloye in Belozersky District of Vologda Oblast in north-western Russia. It connects Kovzha River to Sheksna River, and is part of the Volga–Baltic Waterway. The length of the canal is 66.8 kilometres (41.5 mi). The canal passes the town of Belozersk.

The first plans to dig a canal connecting the basins of the Neva and the Volga were developed in 1710 during the reign of Tsar Peter the Great. In the beginning of the 19th century, the system was actually constructed. It was open in 1810 and got the name of the Mariinsky Canal System. In particular, the waterway followed the Sheksna River, Lake Beloye, the Kovzha River, and the canal connected to the Vytegra River. However, Lake Beloye was an inconvenient piece due to frequent dangerous storms, and also because it was too shallow in the area close to the source of the Sheksna. These conditions often caused shipwrecks.

A number of proposals were submitted which aimed at resolving the problems. In particular, construction of artificial islands was suggested. Mercant Stolbikov from Belozersk obtained a concession to tow the boats over the lake in bad weather. These means, however, proved to be inefficient, and Belozersk merchants asked Tsar Alexander I for a permission to build a bypass canal. The permission was obtained and the works started but were never completed.

In 1830s, merchants asked for permission again, and the construction started in 1843. The level of the canal was 13 feet (4.0 m) higher than the level of the Sheksna entrance and 6 feet (1.8 m) higher than the level of the Kovzha entrance. The construction was completed in 1846.

The eastern entrance to the canal was several kilometers downstream of the village of Krokhino, and thus Krokhino, which was previously one of the main navigation hubs, suddenly was left off the waterway. The population of Belozersk also suffered losses from the opening of the canal, since the boatsman skills and knowledge of the bottom of Lake Beloye were not needed anymore.

Generally, however, the construction of the canal was a great economic success, and by 1870, 70% of the total amount of water goods transportation was along the Mariinsky Canal System. The canal was reconstructed in the 20th century.
