= Belozersk =

Town in Vologda Oblast, Russia

Belozersk Белозерск
- Town
- Church of the Epiphany Ruins of the church of the Nativity of Saint John the Baptist

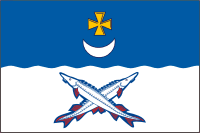
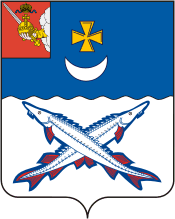
- Flag Coat of arms
- Interactive map of Belozersk
- Location of Belozersk Belozersk (Europe) Belozersk (Russia)
- Coordinates: 60°02′N 37°46′E
- Country: Russia
- Federal subject: Vologda Oblast
- Administrative district: Belozersky District
- Town of district significanceSelsoviet: Belozersk
- First mentioned: 862

Government
  - Body: Town Council
- Elevation: 130 m (430 ft)

Population (2010 Census)
  - Total: 9,616
  - Estimate (2023): 8,183 (−14.9%)

Administrative status
  - Capital of: Belozersky District, town of district significance of Belozersk

Municipal status
  - Municipal district: Belozersky Municipal District
  - Urban settlement: Belozersk Urban Settlement
  - Capital of: Belozersky Municipal District, Belozersk Urban Settlement
- Time zone: UTC+3 (MSK)
- Postal codes: 161200, 161201
- Dialing code: +7 81756
- OKTMO ID: 19610101001
- Website: www.gorodbelozersk.ru

Belozersk (Russian: Белозе́рск), known as Beloozero (Белоозеро) until 1777, is a town and the administrative center of Belozersky District in Vologda Oblast, Russia, located on the southern bank of Lake Beloye, from which it takes the name, 214 kilometers (133 mi) northwest of Vologda, the administrative center of the oblast. Population: 8,464 (2021 census); 9,616 (2010 census); 10,975 (2002 census); 12,352 (1989 Soviet census).

== History ==
Known as Beloozero (lit. 'white lake') until 1777, it was first mentioned in the Primary Chronicle (PVL) in 862 along with several other towns that later became part of Kievan Rus', such as Murom, Novgorod, Polotsk, and Rostov. The PVL claims that Rurik's brother Sineus became the prince of Beloozero in 862. However, Sineus and the other brother Truvor most likely never existed. On several occasions, the settlement was moved from one bank of the lake to another.

In the 11th century, the region was still inhabited primarily by Finnic peoples tribes who fiercely resisted Christianization, one of which was known as the белозерции. In 1071, local pagan priests rose in rebellion, which was put down by the Kievan commander Yan Vyshatich. The Primary Chronicle reports that the dead bodies of priests were suspended from an oak tree, until they were torn to pieces by a bear (regarded by pagans as a holy animal). From the 10th to the 13th centuries, the territory was controlled by the Novgorod Republic. Beloozero was the seat of a small principality (governed by the Princes Belosselsky-Belozersky) between 1238 and the 1370s, but subsequently between 1380 and 1384 became subordinate to the Grand Duchy of Moscow. On July 10, 1612, Polish and Lithuanian vagabonds (Lisowczycy) captured Belozersk without a fight, looting the town.

In the course of the administrative reform carried out in 1708 by Peter the Great, Beloozero was included into Ingermanland Governorate (known since 1710 as Saint Petersburg Governorate) and named one of the towns constituting the governorate. In 1727, a separate Novgorod Governorate was split off and Belozersk became the seat of Belozersk Province in Novgorod Governorate. In 1776, the territory was transferred to Novgorod Viceroyalty. In 1796, the viceroyalty was abolished and Belozersky Uyezd became a part of Novgorod Governorate.

In June 1918, five uyezds of Novgorod Governorate, including Belozersky Uyezd, were split off to form Cherepovets Governorate, with the administrative center in Cherepovets. On August 1, 1927, Cherepovets Governorate was abolished and its territory became Cherepovets Okrug of Leningrad Oblast. At the same time, uyezds were abolished and Belozersky District was established. On September 23, 1937, Belozersky District was transferred to newly established Vologda Oblast.

== Administrative and municipal status ==
Within the framework of administrative divisions, Belozersk serves as the administrative center of Belozersky District. As an administrative division, it is incorporated within Belozersky District as the town of district significance of Belozersk.

As a municipal division, the town of district significance of Belozersk, together with four rural localities in Glushkovsky Selsoviet and two rural localities in Kunostsky Selsoviet of Belozersky District, is incorporated within Belozersky Municipal District as Belozersk Urban Settlement.

== Geography ==
The town is located on the southern bank of Lake Beloye, from which it takes the name, 214 kilometers (133 mi) northwest of Vologda, the administrative center of the oblast.

=== Climate ===
Belozersk falls just within the subarctic climate range, with the fourth-warmest month being just below the isotherm of 10 °C (50 °F) to nearby humid continental areas. Winters are cold but not severe by Russian standards for areas north of the 60th parallel.

Climate data for Belozersk
Month	Jan	Feb	Mar	Apr	May	Jun	Jul	Aug	Sep	Oct	Nov	Dec	Year
Record high °C (°F)	11 (52)	5.9 (42.6)	14.2 (57.6)	27.8 (82.0)	29.8 (85.6)	33.8 (92.8)	34 (93)	33.5 (92.3)	26.1 (79.0)	21.9 (71.4)	12 (54)	9.5 (49.1)	34 (93)
Mean daily maximum °C (°F)	−8.7 (16.3)	−7.5 (18.5)	−1 (30)	7.1 (44.8)	14.4 (57.9)	19.3 (66.7)	21.6 (70.9)	19.3 (66.7)	13.2 (55.8)	6 (43)	−2.1 (28.2)	−6.6 (20.1)	6.3 (43.2)
Daily mean °C (°F)	−11.6 (11.1)	−10.5 (13.1)	−4.8 (23.4)	2.8 (37.0)	9.7 (49.5)	14.8 (58.6)	17.2 (63.0)	14.9 (58.8)	9.5 (49.1)	3.4 (38.1)	−4.2 (24.4)	−8.9 (16.0)	2.7 (36.8)
Mean daily minimum °C (°F)	−15.3 (4.5)	−14.2 (6.4)	−8.9 (16.0)	−1.7 (28.9)	4.7 (40.5)	9.7 (49.5)	12.2 (54.0)	10.4 (50.7)	6 (43)	0.7 (33.3)	−6.8 (19.8)	−12.1 (10.2)	−1.3 (29.7)
Record low °C (°F)	−40 (−40)	−37.2 (−35.0)	−33.9 (−29.0)	−22.8 (−9.0)	−10 (14)	−2.9 (26.8)	1.1 (34.0)	−2 (28)	−7.8 (18.0)	−15.8 (3.6)	−29.2 (−20.6)	−40 (−40)	−40 (−40)
Average precipitation mm (inches)	57 (2.2)	51 (2.0)	44 (1.7)	29 (1.1)	61 (2.4)	53 (2.1)	74 (2.9)	71 (2.8)	47 (1.9)	62 (2.4)	49 (1.9)	61 (2.4)	659 (25.8)

== Economy ==
=== Industry ===
The economy of Belozersk is based on the timber and food industries.

=== Transportation ===
Belozersk is connected by all-seasonal roads with Cherepovets, Kirillov, and Lipin Bor (connecting further to Vytegra). There are also local roads.

The Belozersky Canal, a part of the Volga–Baltic Waterway (formerly known as the Mariinsk Canal System), which connects the river courses of the Sheksna and the Kovzha, runs through Belozersk, bypassing Lake Beloye from the south.

== Culture and recreation ==
The town of Belozersk is classified as a historical town by the Ministry of Culture of Russia, which implies certain restrictions on construction in the historical center.

The medieval monuments in the town center are the Assumption Church (1552) and the Transfiguration Cathedral (1668). The wooden shrine of St. Elijah was built in 1690. The neighborhood is rich in old cloisters, such as Kirillo-Belozersky and Ferapontov Monasteries.

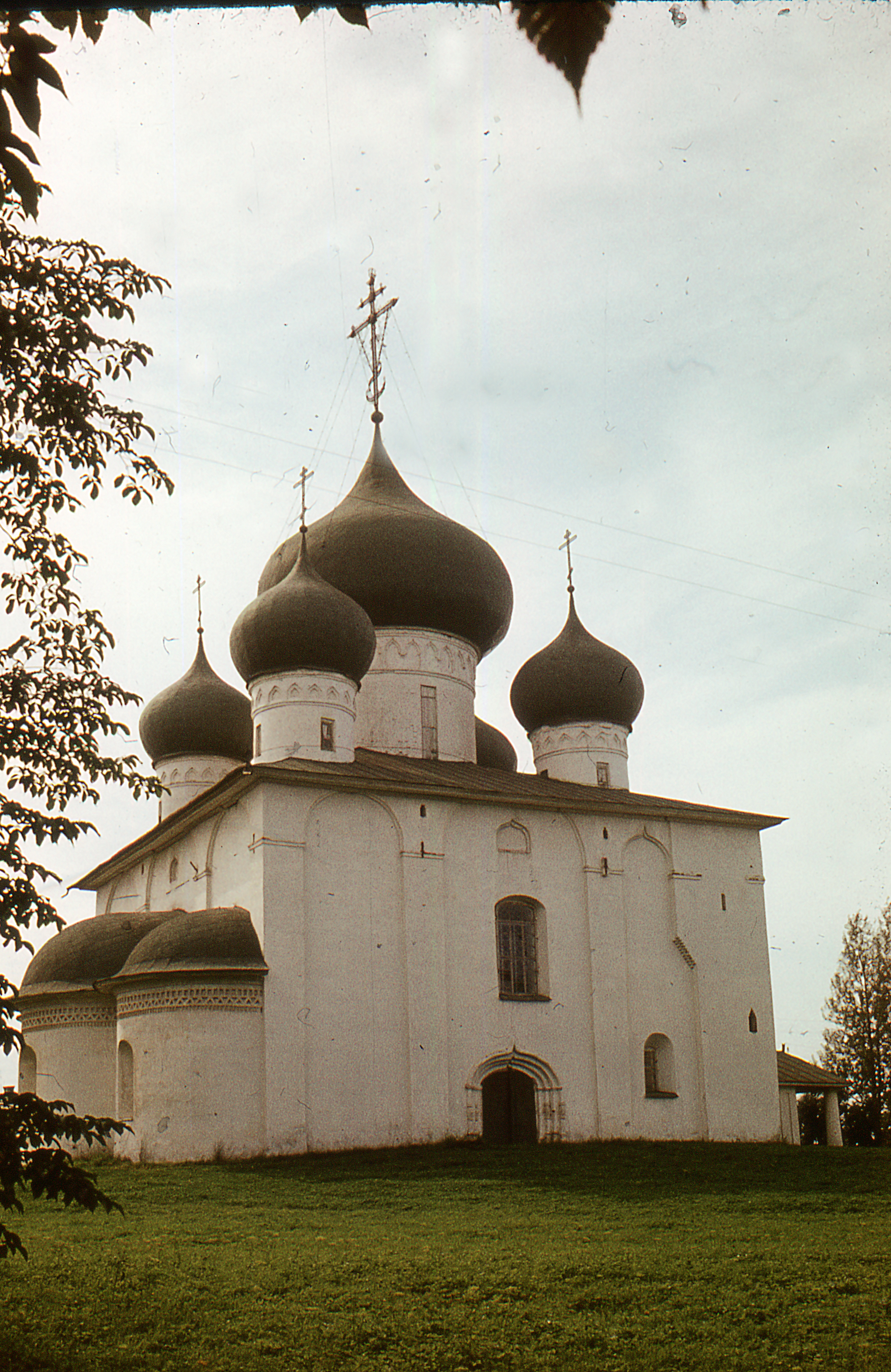
The Assumption Church in Belozersk

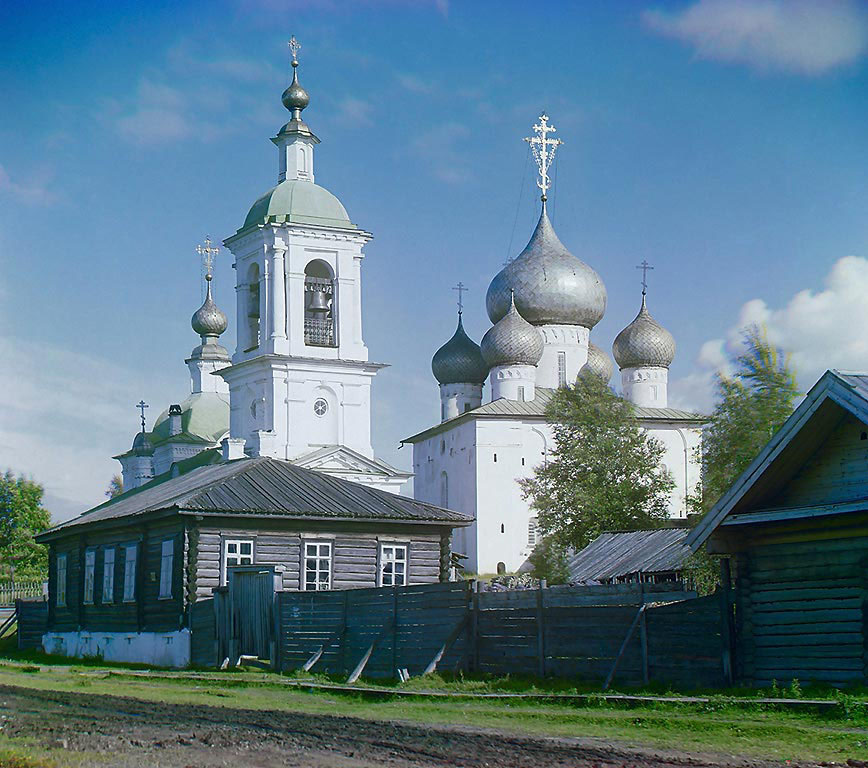
Belozersk Assumption Cathedral in 1909

Two of the most famous medieval icons were created in the 13th century in Belozersk: the Virgin of the White Lake and Saints Peter and Paul. They constitute an intermediate style between Novgorodian and Northern icon painting.

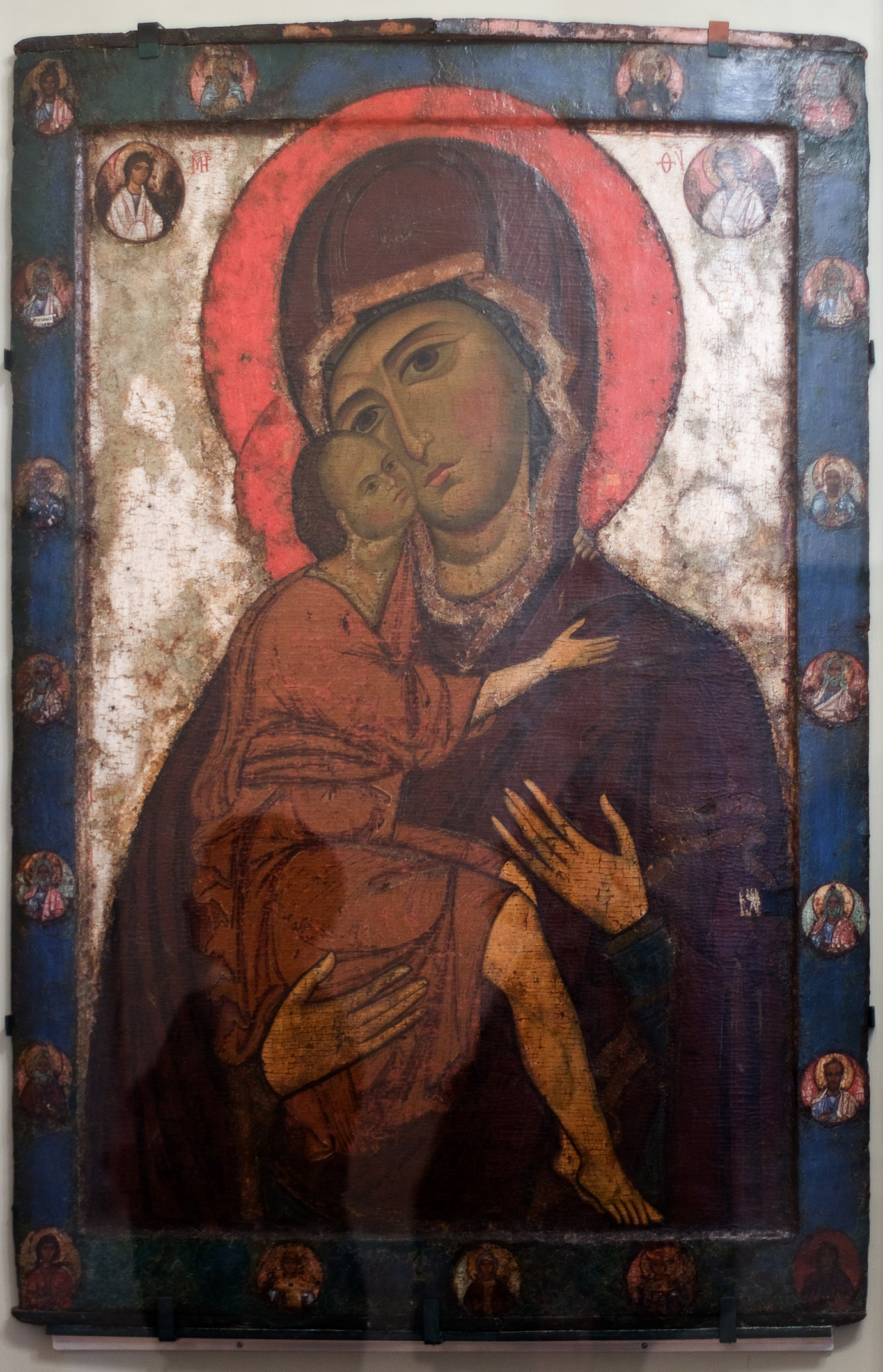
The Virgin of White Lake, the icon of the 13th century

The Belozersky Local Museum located in Belozersk is an umbrella organization which not only hosts ethnographic and historical exhibits, but also manages the most important architectural monuments in Belozersk such as the Transfiguration Cathedral.

== See also ==
- Northern Thebaid

== Bibliography ==
- Brumfield, William С. (2017), "Monuments of Church Architecture in Belozersk: Late Sixteenth to the Early Nineteenth Centuries", Russian History, 44 (2–3. Special Issue: Twenty Years of the Midwest Medieval Slavic Workshop at the University of Chicago): 260–297, doi:10.1163/18763316-04402001, JSTOR 26549845.
