= Belozersky District, Vologda Oblast =

Belozersky District Белозерский район (Russian)
- District
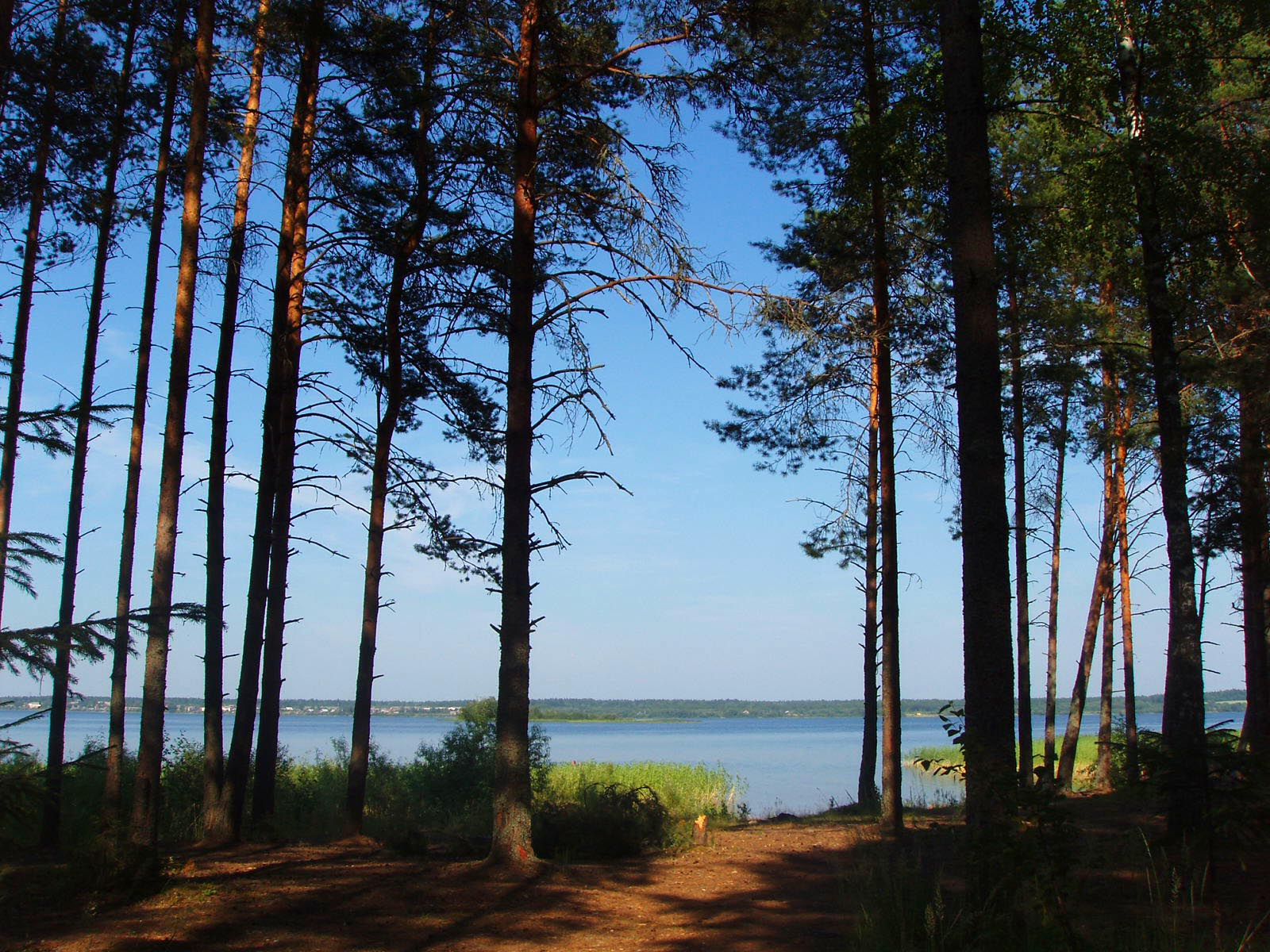
- Vaskin Pine Wood, a protected area of Russia in Belozersky District

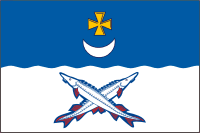
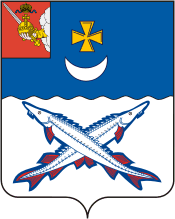
- Flag Coat of arms
- Location of Belozersky District in Vologda Oblast
- Coordinates: 60°02′N 37°47′E
- Country: Russia
- Federal subject: Vologda Oblast
- Established: August 1, 1927
- Administrative center: Belozersk

Area
  - Total: 5,400 km^{2} (2,100 sq mi)

Population (2010 Census)
  - Total: 17,271
  - Density: 3.2/km^{2} (8.3/sq mi)
  - Urban: 55.7%
  - Rural: 44.3%

Administrative structure
  - Administrative divisions: 1 Towns of district significance, 13 Selsoviets
  - Inhabited localities: 1 cities/towns, 278 rural localities

Municipal structure
  - Municipally incorporated as: Belozersky Municipal District
  - Municipal divisions: 1 urban settlements, 5 rural settlements
- Time zone: UTC+3 (MSK)
- OKTMO ID: 19610000
- Website: http://www.belozer.ru

Belozersky District (Russian: Белозе́рский райо́н) is an administrative and municipal district (raion), one of the twenty-six in Vologda Oblast, Russia. It is located in the northwest of the oblast and borders with Vytegorsky District in the north, Vashkinsky District in the northeast, Kirillovsky District in the southeast, Cherepovetsky and Kaduysky Districts in the south, and with Babayevsky District in the west. The area of the district is 5,400 square kilometers (2,100 sq mi). Its administrative center is the town of Belozersk. Population: 17,271 (2010 census); 21,648 (2002 Census); 24,777 (1989 Soviet census). The population of Belozersk accounts for 55.7% of the district's total population.

== Geography ==
The district is located southwest of Lake Beloye, with the southern half of the lake constituting a part of the district's territory. There are many smaller lakes within the district. The biggest of them are Lake Andozero, Lake Lozskoye, and Lake Vorbozomskoye. The entire district belongs to the basin of the Sheksna River. The northern part and the areas adjacent to Lake Beloye drain into the lake and its tributaries. The main tributaries of Lake Beloye within the district are the Megra and the Kovzha Rivers (with the major tributary being the Shola). The Kovzha flows in its lower course, where it actually forms a water reservoir, along the border of the district. The southern part of the district is in the basin of the tributaries of the Andoga River, which itself is a tributary of the Suda River, and the southwestern part is in the basin of the tributaries of the Sheksna. A stretch of the Sheksna River forms the eastern border of the district.

Most of the area of the district is covered by woods.

== History ==
According to the Primary Chronicle, Sineus, a brother of Rurik, became the prince of Beloozero in 862. If one assumes this to be accurate, Belozersk is one of the oldest towns in Russia. However, it is likely that Sineus never existed. The archaeological data show that the settlement existed in the 10th century on the northern shore of the lake, close to the selo of Kisnema (now Troitskoye in Vashkinsky District) but in the 10th century it was transferred to the outflow of the Sheksna River. Later it was moved to the current location. In the 10th–13th centuries, the area was controlled by the Novgorod Republic; in the 13th century it was a part of the Principality of Beloozero; and in the 14th century it became a part of the Grand Duchy of Moscow.

In the course of the administrative reform carried out in 1708 by Peter the Great, the area was included into Ingermanland Governorate (known since 1710 as Saint Petersburg Governorate). In 1727, separate Novgorod Governorate was split off. Belozersk (Beloozero) was named as one of the towns constituting the governorate, and in 1727, Belozersk became the seat of Belozersk Oblast of Novgorod Governorate. In 1776, the area was transferred to Novgorod Viceroyalty. In 1796, the viceroyalty was abolished and Belozersky Uyezd was transferred to Novgorod Governorate.

In June 1918, five uyezds of Novgorod Governorate, including Belozersky Uyezd, were split off to form Cherepovets Governorate, with the administrative center in Cherepovets. On August 1, 1927, Cherepovets Governorate was abolished, and its area became Cherepovets Okrug of Leningrad Oblast. Simultaneously, the uyezds were abolished, and Belozersky District was established. On September 23, 1937, Belozersky District was transferred to newly established Vologda Oblast.

On August 1, 1927, Sholsky District with the administrative center in the selo of Zubovo was also established. In 1937, it was transferred from Leningrad Oblast to Vologda Oblast. In 1959, the district was abolished. The area of Sholsky District was split between Vashkinsky and Belozersky Districts.

== Economy ==
=== Industry ===
The economy of the district is based on timber industry which in 2011 was responsible for 88% of all goods produced in the district.

=== Agriculture ===
As of 2005, twenty-two farms were operating in the district.

=== Transportation ===
Belozersk is connected by all-seasonal roads with Cherepovets, Kirillov, and Lipin Bor (connecting further to Vytegra). There are also local roads.

The Volga–Baltic Waterway (formerly known as the Mariinsk Canal System), connecting the Rybinsk Reservoir in the basin of the Volga River and Lake Onega in the basin of the Neva River, runs through the district, following the course of the Sheksna, Lake Beloye, and the course of the Kovzha. The Belozersky Canal bypasses Lake Beloye from the south.

=== Penitentiary establishments ===
The district houses Prison No. OE 256/5 (ФКУ ИК-5), of the Federal Penitentiary Service, on Ognenny Ostrov on Lake Novozero, southwest of the town of Belozersk. This is one of the five penitentiary institutions in Russia where individuals convicted to life imprisonment are held.

== Culture and recreation ==
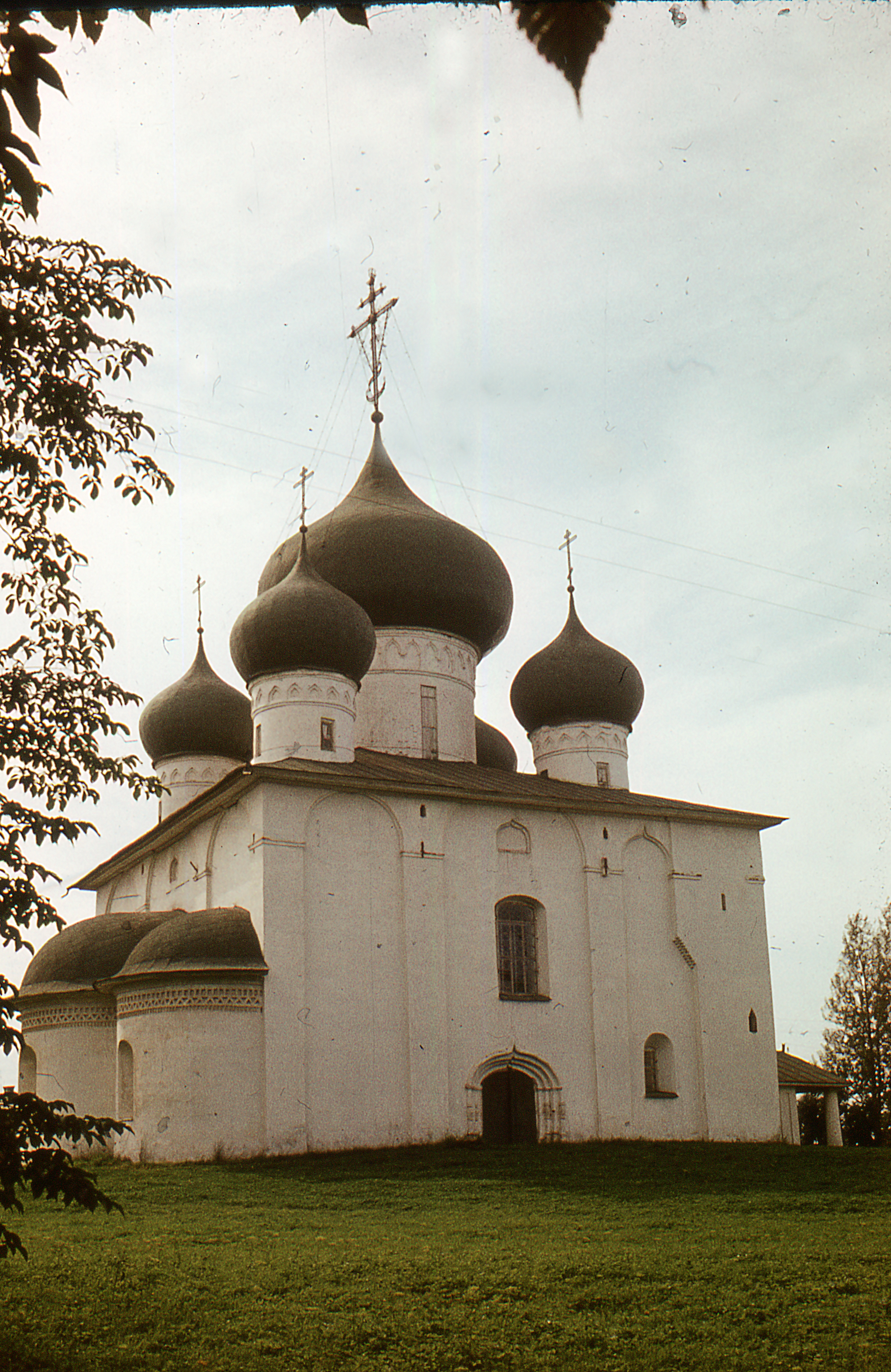
The Assumption Church in Belozersk

The district contains 13 objects classified as cultural and historical heritage by Russian Federal law, and additionally 132 objects classified as cultural and historical heritage of local importance. The cultural heritage monuments of the federal significance are several buildings in the town of Belozersk as well as a number of archaeological monuments.

The Belozersky Local Museum located in Belozersk is an umbrella organization which not only hosts ethnographic and historical exhibits, but also manages the most important architectural monuments in Belozersk such as the Transfiguration Cathedral.

== Notable people ==
- Sergey Vikulov (1922-2006), poet, editor, and the Union of Soviet Writers official
