= Rybinsk =

City in Yaroslavl Oblast, Russia

Rybinsk Рыбинск
- City
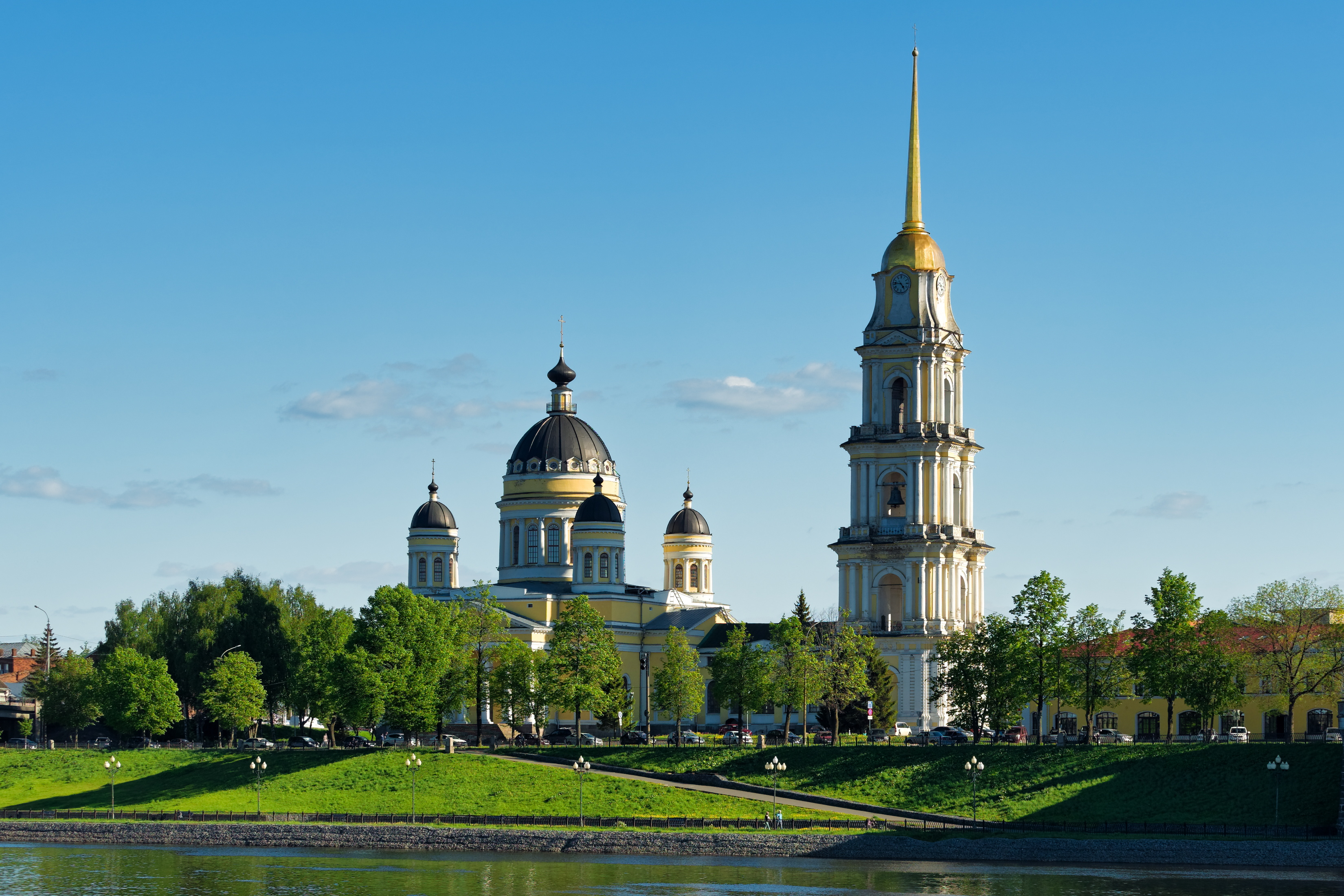
- Transfiguration Cathedral in Rybinsk

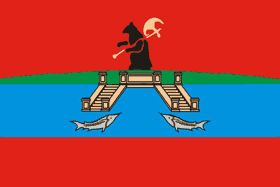
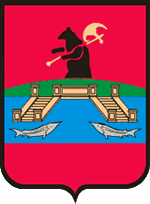
- Flag Coat of arms
- Interactive map of Rybinsk
- Location of Rybinsk Rybinsk (Yaroslavl Oblast)
- Coordinates: 58°03′N 38°50′E
- Country: Russia
- Federal subject: Yaroslavl Oblast
- First mentioned: 1071
- City status since: 1777

Government
  - Mayor: Dmitry Rudakov
- Elevation: 100 m (330 ft)

Population (2010 Census)
  - Total: 200,771
  - Estimate (2025): 177,295 (−11.7%)
  - Rank: 93rd in 2010

Administrative status
  - Subordinated to: city of oblast significance of Rybinsk
  - Capital of: Rybinsky District, city of oblast significance of Rybinsk

Municipal status
  - Urban okrug: Rybinsk Urban Okrug
  - Capital of: Rybinsk Urban Okrug, Rybinsky Municipal District
- Time zone: UTC+3 (MSK)
- Postal code: 152900—152939
- Dialing code: +7 4855
- OKTMO ID: 78715000001
- Website: www.rybinsk.ru

Rybinsk (Russian: Рыбинск, Russian pronunciation: [ˈrɨbʲɪnsk]) is the second-largest city of Yaroslavl Oblast, Russia. It lies on both banks of the Volga River at its confluence with the Sheksna and Cheremukha, about 82 kilometres (51 mi) northwest of Yaroslavl and 270 kilometres (168 mi) north of Moscow. As of the 2021 Census, its population was 177,295 (200,771 in 2010).

Historically a major transshipment and grain trading hub on the upper Volga and the Vyshny Volochyok/Mariinsk–Tikhvin waterway system, Rybinsk expanded rapidly in the 18th–19th centuries and was chartered as a town in 1777. In the Soviet era it developed into an engineering center and inland river port associated with the construction of the Rybinsk Reservoir and Rybinsk Hydroelectric Station. The city is noted for its 19th‑century merchant architecture along the Volga embankment and is sometimes included in extended Golden Ring of Russia itineraries. Rybinsk has borne several names: Ust‑Sheksna (until 1504), Rybnaya Sloboda (until 1777), Shcherbakov (1946–1957), and Andropov (1984–1989). In 2021 Rybinsk was awarded the honorary title “City of Labour Valour”.

== History ==
=== Origins ===
Rybinsk (earlier Rybnaya Sloboda) arose on the right bank of the Volga at the mouth of the Cheremukha; the point of land between them is known as Strelka (“the Spit”). Across the river stood the older settlement of Ust‑Sheksna at the mouth of the Sheksna, first attested in 1071 in the Laurentian Chronicle during the suppression of a pagan revolt near Rostov. Excavations there have uncovered an early 11th‑century settlement (over 3 ha) with imported Byzantine and Scandinavian goods and hoards of 10th‑century Arab silver; by the 13th century a 30‑hectare craft‑and‑trade center had formed with evidence of blacksmithing, metallurgy, jewelry production, ceramics and woodworking, as well as numerous lead seals indicating administrative functions on the Volga trade route. The settlement was devastated in the Mongol invasion of 1238 and later lost its administrative role as the Muscovite state consolidated in the late 15th century.

On the right bank, crown‑estate Rybnaya Sloboda in the 16th–17th centuries held monopoly rights to catch “red fish” (sturgeon, beluga, sterlet) on stretches of the Volga, Sheksna and Mologa to supply the Muscovite court. The first stone churches appeared in the 17th century; the oldest surviving building in the modern city is the Kazan Church (1697).

=== 18th–early 20th centuries ===
In 1777 Catherine the Great granted town rights; the name Rybinsk (influenced by the district name) became standard. After the capital moved to St Petersburg and Baltic trade boomed, Rybinsk prospered at the junction of routes from St Petersburg to the Caspian and from Siberia (via the Kama) to the Baltic. Because the upper Volga above Rybinsk was often shallow, heavy barges from the Middle and Lower Volga unloaded here to smaller craft able to navigate the Vyshny Volochyok Waterway and, later, the Mariinsk Canal system and Tikhvin Canal system. Rybinsk developed grain warehouses, salt depots, inns, and a river port that became known as the “capital of barge haulers.” The Neoclassical Savior‑Transfiguration Cathedral (1838–1851) dominates the embankment. Rail arrived with the Rybinsk–Bologoye railway line (1870), expanding transshipment onto trains and spurring industry (mills, breweries, rope‑making, ironfounding and shipbuilding, including a Nobel Brothers’ shipyard founded in 1907).

=== 1917–1945 ===
Soviet power was established on 2 March 1918; an anti‑Bolshevik uprising on 8 July 1918 was quickly suppressed. Rybinsk briefly served as the center of Rybinsk Governorate (1921–1923) and Rybinsk Okrug (1929–1930). Industrialization transformed the city into a machine‑building center: the “Russkiy Renault” auto plant (founded 1916) evolved into a major aero‑engine works (later ODK‑Saturn); a terminal grain elevator built in 1936 near Rybinsk‑Tovarny Station was among the largest in Europe at the time. In 1936 construction began on the Rybinsk hydroelectric complex as part of the “Big Volga” project; reservoir filling started in 1941 and continued to 1947. Two units went online in late 1941–early 1942, supplying wartime power (including to Moscow via a dedicated underground reserve cable). The reservoir inundated large areas, including the town of Mologa, whose residents were largely resettled in Rybinsk.

=== Postwar period ===
On 13 September 1946 the city was renamed Shcherbakov after A. S. Shcherbakov; the historic name Rybinsk was restored in October 1957. On 15 March 1984 it was renamed Andropov after Yuri Andropov; the name Rybinsk returned on 4 March 1989. Postwar decades saw growth in instrument‑making, electrical engineering, optics, shipbuilding, and machine construction; housing estates (Veretye, Severny, Zapadny) and infrastructure were built, including a road bridge over the Volga (1963) and a trolleybus system (1976).

=== Since 1991 ===
Market reforms and the 1990s crisis hit local industry; some plants closed while others restructured. In the 2000s–2020s, new and retooled enterprises appeared (e.g., ODK–Gas Turbines, cable and food plants), and an IT sector emerged (Krista, branches of Tensor, etc.). Urban renewal restored the Transfiguration Cathedral, Krasnaya Square, parks, and the railway station area.

== Geography ==
Rybinsk stands on the Mologa–Sheksna Lowland near the outlet of the Volga from the Rybinsk Reservoir, created where the Sheksna meets the Volga. It is at the northernmost point of the Volga: upstream the river flows generally northeast; at Rybinsk it turns southeast. The city extends about 22 kilometres (14 mi) along the river, with a width up to 6 kilometres (4 mi). The area marks a transition between mixed forest and southern taiga.

=== Hydrography ===
The historic center is bounded by the Volga, the Cheremukha (right tributary of the Volga), the Korovka (left tributary of the Cheremukha), and the Dresvyanka/Pakhomovsky stream (left tributary of the Korovka). The small Utkash River isolates the eastern suburb of Kopaevo; the Fominsky stream separates the northwestern suburb of Perebory. On the left bank, the Krutets stream and the Selyanka River mark the edge of the Zavolzhye (left‑bank) part of the city. The Rybinsk hydroengineering complex spans both the Volga and the Sheksna; the confluence of the Volga, Sheksna and Mologa formed a broad, shallow reservoir and a long island between the old Sheksna bed, the reservoir and the Volga.

=== Climate ===
Rybinsk has a four‑season humid continental climate with cold winters and warm summers. Winters (mid‑November to mid‑March) feature frequent thaws; July is the warmest month and often reaches around 30 °C on hot days. The mean annual temperature is about 5 °C (41 °F) and annual precipitation about 650 mm.

Climate data for Rybinsk (1991-2020, extremes 1922–present)
Month	Jan	Feb	Mar	Apr	May	Jun	Jul	Aug	Sep	Oct	Nov	Dec	Year
Record high °C (°F)	7.0 (44.6)	6.2 (43.2)	17.3 (63.1)	28.0 (82.4)	33.6 (92.5)	35.3 (95.5)	37.2 (99.0)	36.0 (96.8)	29.4 (84.9)	24.8 (76.6)	14.7 (58.5)	8.9 (48.0)	37.2 (99.0)
Mean daily maximum °C (°F)	−5.4 (22.3)	−4.4 (24.1)	1.4 (34.5)	9.9 (49.8)	17.7 (63.9)	21.6 (70.9)	23.9 (75.0)	21.4 (70.5)	15.5 (59.9)	7.8 (46.0)	0.4 (32.7)	−3.4 (25.9)	8.9 (48.0)
Daily mean °C (°F)	−8.2 (17.2)	−7.9 (17.8)	−2.8 (27.0)	4.7 (40.5)	12.0 (53.6)	16.5 (61.7)	18.9 (66.0)	16.6 (61.9)	11.2 (52.2)	4.8 (40.6)	−1.6 (29.1)	−5.8 (21.6)	4.9 (40.8)
Mean daily minimum °C (°F)	−11.1 (12.0)	−11.2 (11.8)	−6.5 (20.3)	0.4 (32.7)	7.1 (44.8)	11.8 (53.2)	14.4 (57.9)	12.3 (54.1)	7.8 (46.0)	2.4 (36.3)	−3.5 (25.7)	−8.4 (16.9)	1.3 (34.3)
Record low °C (°F)	−40.1 (−40.2)	−38.9 (−38.0)	−34.6 (−30.3)	−21.9 (−7.4)	−3.9 (25.0)	0.8 (33.4)	5.2 (41.4)	0.3 (32.5)	−5.9 (21.4)	−17.8 (0.0)	−26.3 (−15.3)	−42.6 (−44.7)	−42.6 (−44.7)
Average precipitation mm (inches)	48 (1.9)	39 (1.5)	35 (1.4)	33 (1.3)	53 (2.1)	74 (2.9)	80 (3.1)	80 (3.1)	63 (2.5)	64 (2.5)	53 (2.1)	51 (2.0)	673 (26.4)
Average rainy days	6	5	7	13	16	17	16	16	18	18	12	6	150
Average snowy days	27	23	16	7	1	0.2	0	0	1	7	19	24	125
Average relative humidity (%)	84	81	77	70	68	72	74	78	82	83	86	85	78
Source: Pogoda.ru.net

== Symbols ==
The city’s coat of arms was granted with town status by Catherine II on 3 August 1777 and confirmed in law on 20 June 1778. It shows, above a stylized river, the Yaroslavl bear with a golden axe, signifying the city’s affiliation with the Yaroslavl lands; in the lower part two sterlets indicate the abundance of valuable fish and the historic role of Rybinsk as a supplier of “red fish” to the Muscovite court. The quayside stairs allude to Catherine II’s ceremonial visit on 9 May 1767.

== Administrative and municipal status ==
Within the framework of administrative divisions, Rybinsk serves as the administrative center of Rybinsky District, even though it is not a part of it. As an administrative division, it is incorporated separately as the city of oblast significance of Rybinsk—an administrative unit with the status equal to that of the districts. As a municipal division, the city of oblast significance of Rybinsk is incorporated as Rybinsk Urban Okrug.

== Demographics ==
Population: 177,295 (2021 Census); 200,771 (2010 Census).

Registered population on 1 January 2021: 182,383.

By ethnicity (Rosstat volume for the “2020” census of Yaroslavl Oblast), Russians form the large majority; minorities include Ukrainians, Tajiks, Armenians and many smaller communities.

== Economy ==
Rybinsk is a major machine‑building center. Leading sectors include gas turbine engines and industrial gas‑turbine packages (ODK‑Saturn), power and gas‑compression units (ODK – Gas Turbines), shipbuilding (Vympel Shipyard; the Nobel Brothers’ Shipyard builds and repairs tankers and dry‑cargo vessels), instrument‑making (Rybinsk Instrument‑Making Plant, “Luch”), cable manufacturing (Rybinskkabel; Rybinskelectrocable), road machinery (Raskat), and snowmobiles/ATVs (Russkaya Mekhanika). Grain handling and milling remain traditional sectors (elevators and mills). An IT sector has developed (Krista; branches of Tensor, etc.; a 300‑workplace IT center is under construction).

== Transport ==
=== Rail ===
Rybinsk‑Passenger lies on the Northern Railway’s Bologoye—Rybinsk—Yaroslavl axis. A direct sleeper to Moscow runs several times per week via Sonkovo and Savyolovo; other through services link Samara, Ivanovo, Ufa and Kostroma with Saint Petersburg (seasonal variations apply). A limited‑stop “Chaika” express connects Rybinsk and Yaroslavl. The 1905 station building is a federal architectural monument.

=== Road and local transport ===
Regional highways link Rybinsk with Yaroslavl, Tutaev, Poshekhonye, Myshkin, Uglich, and Cherepovets. Crossing of the Volga is via the 1963 road bridge and the Rybinsk HPP dam (used mainly by transit trucks). City transit comprises buses and trolleybuses; route taxis also operate.

=== Water ===
Locks at the hydrocomplex provide navigation on the Volga–Baltic Waterway and Moscow Canal routes. The city has a freight river port and seasonal passenger services. A hydrofoil route between Yaroslavl and Tver with intermediate stops, including Rybinsk, launched in 2025.

=== Air ===
Local airfields Staroselye and Yuzhny do not have scheduled passenger service. The nearest airport with regular flights is Tunoshna Airport near Yaroslavl (about 95 kilometres (59 mi)).

== Education ==
As of 2019 the municipal system comprised 92 institutions: 56 preschools, 27 general education schools, five supplementary education institutions, two support institutions, four higher‑education institutions and nine secondary vocational colleges.

Secondary vocational institutions include the Rybinsk Aviation College, the Rybinsk Polygraphic College, the Rybinsk River College named after V. I. Kalashnikov (branch of the Volga State University of Water Transport), a medical college, transport/technological and industrial/economic colleges, a college of urban infrastructure and a forestry college. Higher education is represented by the Rybinsk State Aviation Technical University named after P. A. Solovyov and several local branches of external universities. The “Kvantorium” children’s technopark serves c.800 students, and a dual education program runs at the Industrial and Economic College in partnership with ODK‑Saturn.

== Sports ==
Rybinsk has 15 sports schools (eight with Olympic‑reserve status) and 321 sports facilities. Main venues include Saturn Stadium (under reconstruction), Meteor, Metallist, Pereborets and Avangard; the Polet Sports Palace (1977; rebuilt 2013; c.1,700 seats) hosts ice sports and youth hockey. Nearby, the Demino Ski Center has FIS‑certified courses and has hosted Cross‑Country World Cup races; it hosted Russian biathlon championships in January 2020.

== Culture and museums ==
Cultural institutions include the Rybinsk Drama Theater (founded 1825), the Rybinsk Puppet Theater (1933), smaller theater companies, a centralized library system, and several houses of culture (community centers). Cinemas include “Kosmos” and “Cinema V” (five screens) in the Vikonda mall.

The Rybinsk Museum-Reserve holds over 120,000 items, including collections from noble estates. Other museums include the Memorial House‑Museum of Academician A. A. Ukhtomsky; the Museum of the Mologa Region and the “Submerged Sanctuaries of the Mologa Land”; the private “Nobels and the Nobel Movement” museum; “Rybinsk–Cinema–Hollywood” (about brothers Joseph and Nicholas Schenck); the “Soviet Era” display; an Admiral F. F. Ushakov museum complex; a Marine Museum; and a boutique piano workshop museum.

== Events ==
Recurring events include the Demino Ski Marathon (Worldloppet), a winter Ded Moroz parade, the Ushakov Festival, Merchant’s Day, City Day, the Lev Oshanin poetry and song festival, the Rybinsk Half‑Marathon, and open‑air “Jazz in Karyakinsky Garden.”

== Religion ==
Orthodoxy is predominant; Orthodox parishes belong to the Rybinsk Diocese of the Russian Orthodox Church. The 1697 Kazan Church (the city’s oldest surviving building) and the Neoclassical Transfiguration Cathedral are notable.

A large Polish community in the late 19th–early 20th centuries funded the Neo‑Gothic Roman Catholic Church of the Sacred Heart of Jesus; today the building houses the “Prometey” student club. A Jewish community (“Lechaim,” under FEOR) has existed since the 19th century; the 1916 brick synagogue was returned to believers in 2014 after decades of other uses. A local Muslim community has operated since 2018 (prayer room).

== Architecture and sights ==
Rybinsk retains a large ensemble of 18th–early 20th‑century architecture along the Volga embankment. The pair of Grain Exchange buildings are landmarks: the older in strict classicism, and the 1912 “new exchange” in a revival “Russian style” with tile facing—today housing the Rybinsk Museum‑Reserve. Together with the Transfiguration Cathedral and the Volga road bridge they form the city’s signature panorama.

On Krasnaya (Red) Square a monument to Emperor Alexander II (A. M. Opekushin’s last monumental work) was erected in 1914 and destroyed in 1918; a statue of Lenin now stands on its pedestal. Periodic proposals to restore the Alexander II monument have not advanced. The Mother Volga statue (1953) stands on the Rybinsk HPP spillway dam and was named the city’s symbol in a 2016 online vote.

== Paleontology ==
Near Rybinsk, fossils of Early Triassic temnospondyls have been discovered. Remains of Thoosuchus and Benthosuchus have been found in Lower Olenekian deposits.

== International relations ==
Rybinsk is twinned with:

- Kingsport, Tennessee, United States (1989)
- Johnson City, Tennessee, United States (1989)
- Bristol, Tennessee, United States (1989)
- Herceg Novi, Montenegro (2018)
- Karnobat, Bulgaria (2018)
- Chongzuo, Guangxi, China (2021; cooperation agreement)

== Notable people ==
- Aleksey Ovchinin (born 1971), cosmonaut
- Genrikh Yagoda (1891–1938), NKVD leader
- Joseph M. Schenck (1876–1961), film executive
- Nicholas Schenck (1880–1969), film executive
- Nikita Lastochkin (born 1990), racing driver
