= Northern Dvina Canal =

Canal in Vologda Oblast, Russia

Coordinates: 59°54′36″N 38°40′32″E

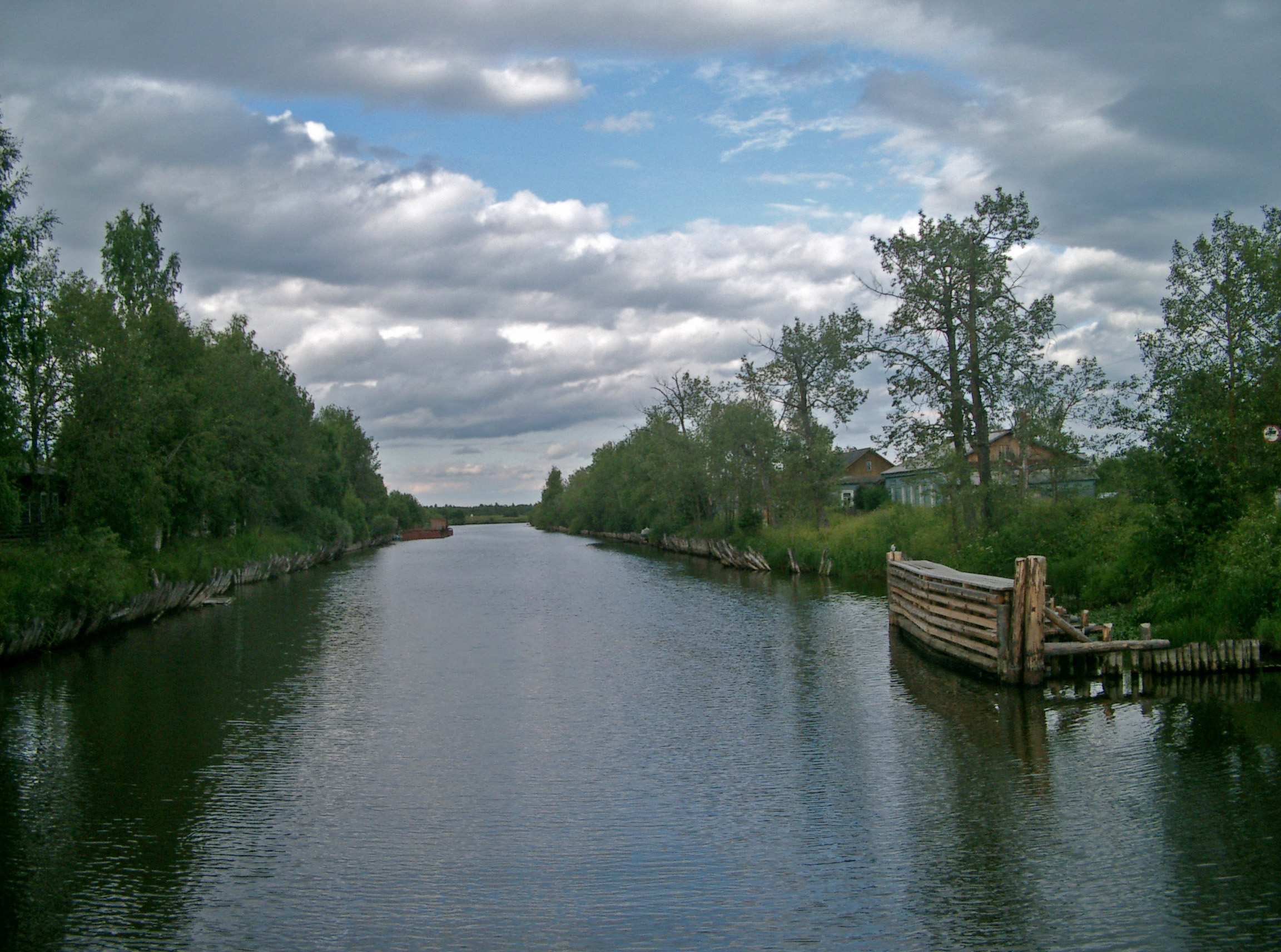
- The Northern Dvina Canal in the town of Kirillov
- Interactive map of Northern Dvina Canal

Specifications
- Status: Open

History
- Date of first use: 1828

Geography
- Start point: Sheksna
- End point: Lake Kubenskoye

The Northern Dvina Canal (Северодвинский канал) is a 64 km long canal in Vologda Oblast in Russia. It connects the Volga–Baltic Waterway to the Northern Dvina River through its tributary, the Sukhona River. The Northern Dvina Canal is one of the two canals (the other one being the abandoned Northern Catherine Canal) connecting the river basins of the Volga and the Northern Dvina.

At its western end the Northern Dvina Canal starts at the Sheksna River (a part of the Volga–Baltic Waterway), 10 km south of the town of Kirillov. The canal runs north towards Lake Siverskoye and the town of Kirillov. From Kirillov, the canal turns northeast through a series of small lakes, including Lake Pokrovskoye, Lake Zaulomskoye, and Lake Kishemskoye. To the east of Lake Kishemskoye, the canal joins the valley of the Itkla and follows it until it joins the Porozovitsa River. At this point, the canal gradually turns southeast and ends up in the northwestern end of Lake Kubenskoye. The lake is the source of the Sukhona River.

There are six locks on the canal, all made of wood. One of the locks is located in the southern part of the town of Kirillov.

The canal is still in operation and supports occasional cruise and cargo traffic.

== History ==
Until 1703, the Northern Dvina was the main waterway connecting Russia to the rest of Europe, and Arkhangelsk was the main Russian harbor used for foreign trade. In 1703, Saint Petersburg was founded, and Peter the Great issued a number of decrees limiting capacities of Arkhangelsk as a sea port and intended to reroute foreign trade to the Baltic Sea. Arkhangelsk was fully restored as a sea port in 1762, and thus water connections between the Northern Dvina basin and central Russia were badly needed. In 1798 research started on the best route for a canal connecting the Sheksna and Lake Kubenskoye.

In the beginning of the 19th century, the North Ekaterininsky Canal was considered to be more important, and the project was shelved. However, the North Ekaterininsky Canal proved inefficient for a number of reasons and was finally closed in 1838. On the other side, the Napoleonic Wars blocked the access of Russia to Europe via the Baltic Sea, and for some time Arkhangelsk again became the most important foreign trade harbor, with shipbuilding as an important local industry. In 1823 a route for the canal was surveyed for the second time, and construction started in 1824. The canal opened in 1828 under the name Alexander of Württemberg Canal, after the Russian minister of transportation in 1822–1833, Duke Alexander Friedrich of Württemberg.

Subsequently, maintenance works were performed. In 1834 a dam was constructed on the Sukhona to stabilize the level of Lake Kubenskoye. In 1884 the reconstruction of the canal (four of the locks were demolished) increased the maximum size of the ships which could use the canal. Finally, one more reconstruction was performed between 1916 and 1921. After the reconstruction the name of the canal was changed to avoid any mention of the royal family.
