= Sheksna =

River in Russia

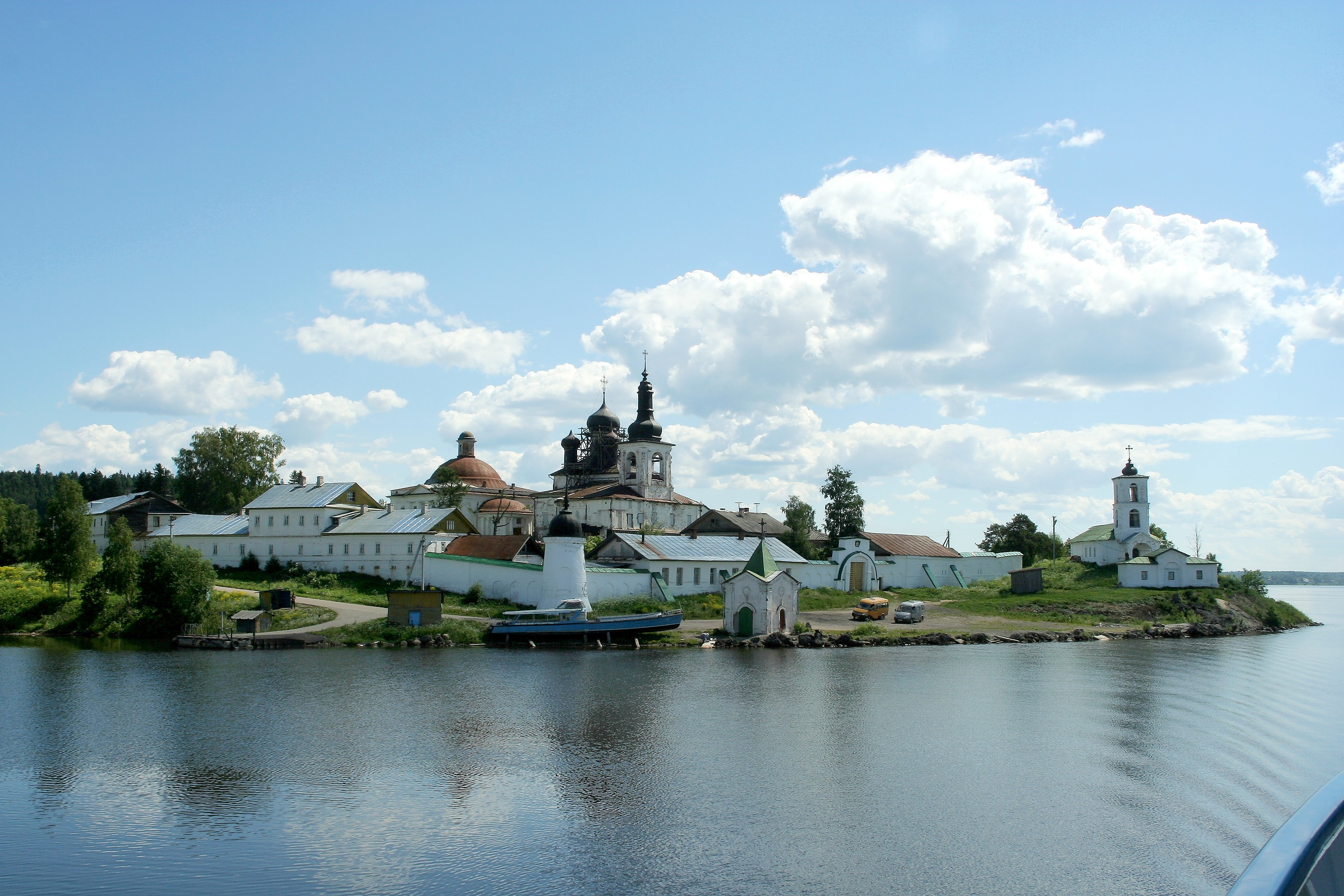
- Goritsky Monastery by the river

- Map of the Rybinsk Reservoir basin. The Sheksna is shown on the map
- Native name: Шексна (Russian)

Location
- Country: Russia

Physical characteristics
- Source: Lake Beloye
  - coordinates: 60°04′N 38°00′E
  - elevation: 120 m (390 ft)
- Mouth: Rybinsk Reservoir
  - coordinates: 59.0863°N 37.7624°E
- Length: 139 km (86 mi)
- Basin size: 19,000 km^{2} (7,300 sq mi)
- Discharge
  - average: 172 cubic metres per second (6,100 cu ft/s)

Basin features
- Progression: Rybinsk Reservoir→ Volga→ Caspian Sea

The Sheksna (Russian: Шексна́) is a river in the Belozersky, Kirillovsky, Sheksninsky, and Cherepovetsky districts of Vologda Oblast in Russia. It is a left tributary of the Volga. It is 139 kilometres (86 mi) long, and the area of its basin 19,000 square kilometres (7,300 sq mi). The principal tributaries of the Sheksna are the Sizma (left) and the Kovzha (right).

According to Max Vasmer's Etymological Dictionary, the origin of the river's name is unclear, but it may originate from a Finnic language meaning "a woodpecker" or more specifically "a spotted woodpecker". The urban-type settlement of Sheksna and Sheksninsky District are named after the river.

The source of the Sheksna is in the southeastern end of Lake Beloye. The river flows south and subsequently turns east. It joins the northern part of the Rybinsk Reservoir of the Volga near the city of Cherepovets. Cherepovets, as well as the urban-type settlement of Sheksna, are located on the Sheksna.

Most of the present course of the river was accommodated as the Sheksna Reservoir, with the dam constructed in Sheksna. Previously, the length of the Sheksna was some 400 kilometers (250 mi), and the mouth of the river was located in the city of Rybinsk, Yaroslavl Oblast. The part of the river between Cherepovets and Rybinsk disappeared when the Rybinsk Reservoir was constructed between 1935 and 1947. Currently, the only natural stretch of the course of the Sheksna is located between the urban-type settlement of Sheksna and the city of Cherepovets.

The river basin of the Sheksna comprises vast areas in the west and in the northwest of Vologda Oblast, including parts of Vytegorsky, Vashkinsky, Kirillovsky, Belozersky, Sheksninsky, and Cherepovetsky Districts, as well as minor areas in Kargopolsky District of Arkhangelsk Oblast. This area includes the towns of Kirillov and Belozersk, as well as the urban-type settlement of Chyobsara and the selo of Lipin Bor, the administrative center of Vashkinsky District.

The Sheksna is a part of the Volga–Baltic Waterway and is used for both cruise and cargo traffic. Both the Northern Dvina Canal, which connects the basins of the Volga and the Northern Dvina via Lake Kubenskoye, and the Belozersky Canal, bypassing Lake Beloye, connect to the Sheksna.
