= Lake Kubenskoye =

Lake in Vologda, Russia

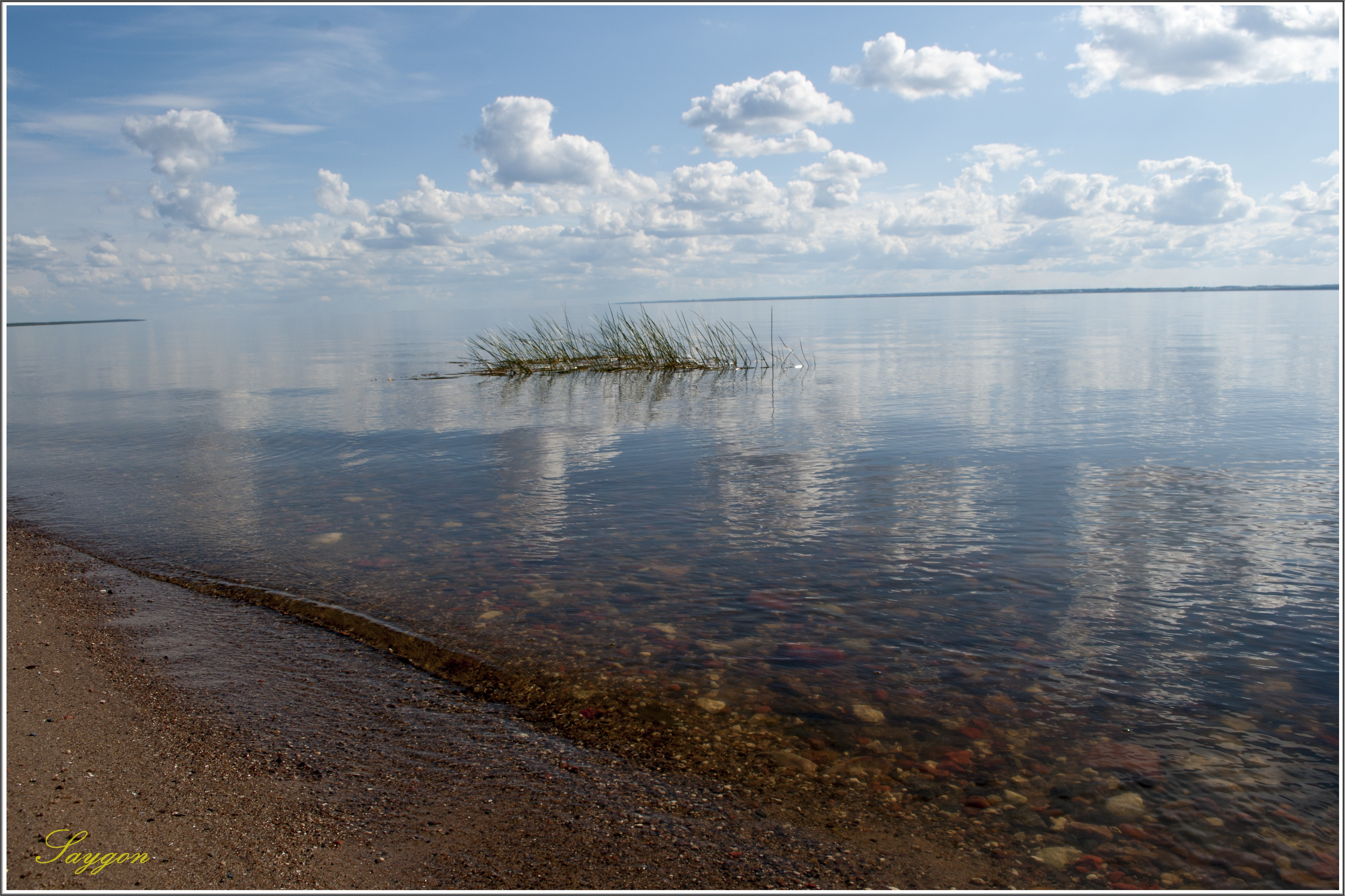

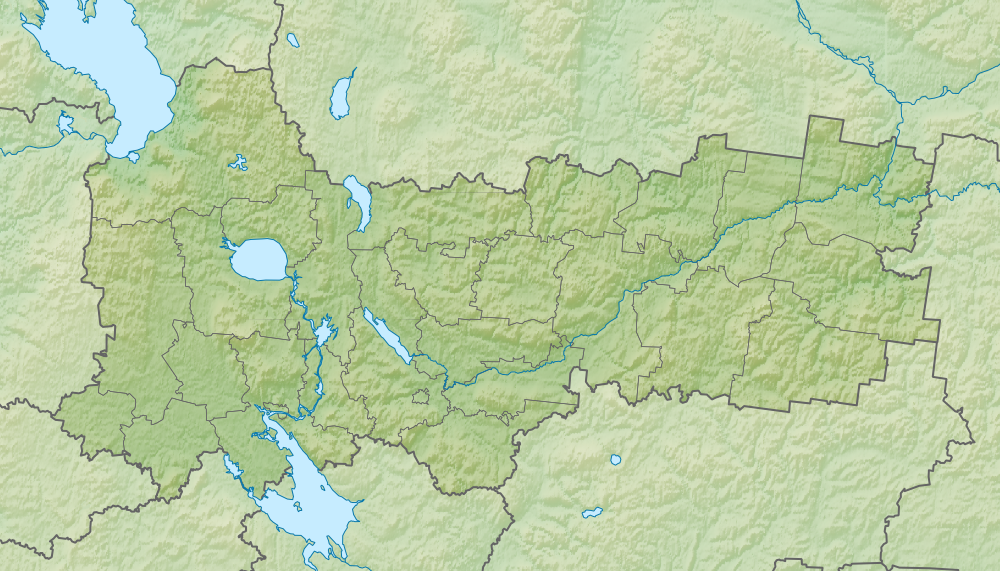
- Location within Russia Location within Vologda Oblast
- Location: Vologda Oblast
- Coordinates: 59°37′36″N 39°30′23″E
- Type: natural lake, reservoir
- Primary inflows: Kubena, Uftyuga, Porozovitsa
- Primary outflows: Sukhona
- Catchment area: 14,700 square kilometres (5,700 mi^{2})
- Basin countries: Russia
- Max. length: 54 kilometres (34 mi)
- Max. width: 12 kilometres (7.5 mi)
- Surface area: 407 square kilometres (157 mi^{2})
- Average depth: 1.2 metres (3.9 ft)
- Max. depth: 10 metres (33 ft) - 13 metres (43 ft)
- Surface elevation: 110.1 metres (361 ft)

Lake Kubenskoye (Russian: Кубенское озеро) is a large and shallow lake in Vologda Oblast of Northwest Russia, situated at the height of 110.1 metres above mean sea level, stretching for 54 km from north-west to south-east.

The lake area is 648 square kilometres (250 mi^{2}), without islands — 407 square kilometres (157 mi^{2}). Its average depth is 1.2 metres (3.9 ft). The lake is known for its frequents storms and seasonal fluctuations of water level. The average seasonal variation is 2.4 metres (7.9 ft) and the maximum is 5.49 metres (18.0 ft). The lake is elongated from the northwest to the southeast. It is the source of the river Sukhona, which flows out in the southeastern corner of the lake.

Administratively, the lake is divided between Vologodsky District (west), Sokolsky District (southeast), and Ust-Kubinsky District (east) of Vologda Oblast. In terms of the area, Lake Kubenskoye is the fourth natural lake of Vologda Oblast (behind Lake Onega, Lake Beloye, and Lake Vozhe) and the fifth lake (also behind the Rybinsk Reservoir).

The area of the basin of the lake is 14,700 square kilometres (5,700 mi^{2}). The basin occupies much of the central and northern parts of Vologda Oblast, as well as parts of Konoshsky District of Arkhangelsk Oblast. The major tributary of the lake is the Kubena.

== History ==
The lake was settled by Russians in the 12th century, when the Kamenny Monastery was founded on an islet in the lake. One branch of the Princes of Yaroslavl owned lands in the vicinity and was known as Princes Kubensky. Since 1828, the lake has been part of the Volga-Northern Dvina canal system. The eastern terminus of the Northern Dvina Canal is at the northwestern end of the lake. In 1917, a dam was built at the outflow of the Sukhona, thus converting the lake into a reservoir.
