= Lake Beloye (Vologda Oblast) =

Lake in Vologda, Russia

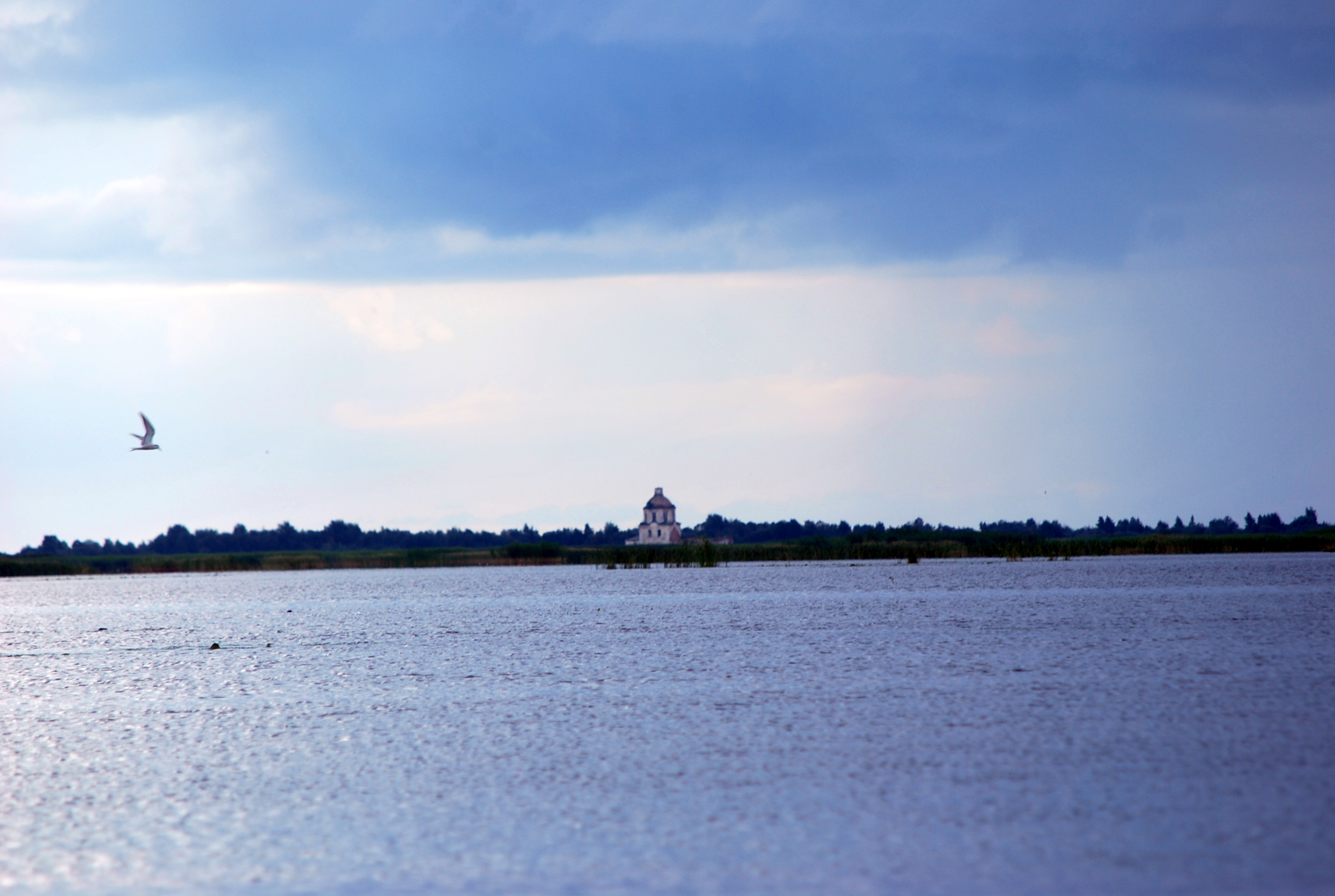

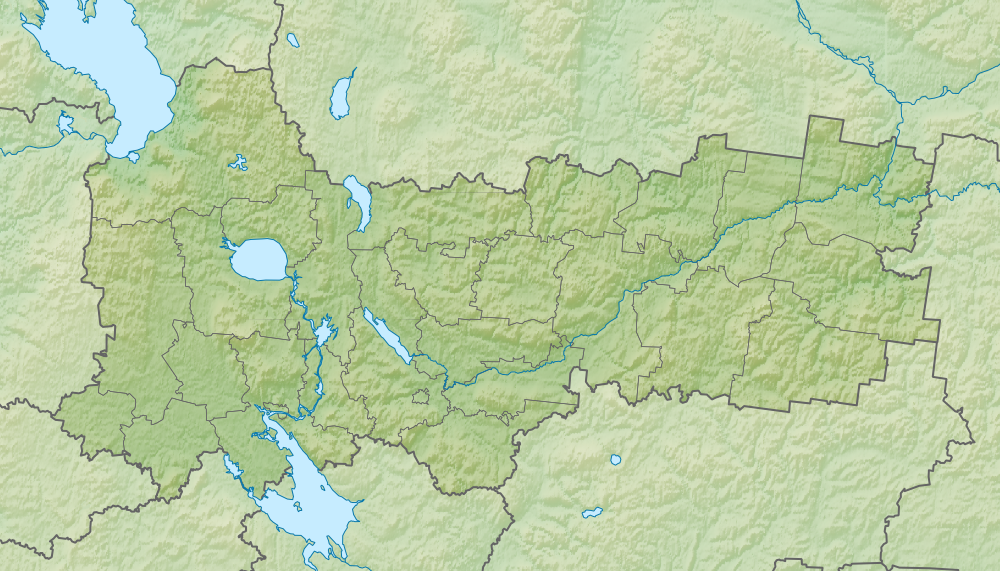
- Location within Russia Location within Vologda Oblast
- Location: Vologda Oblast
- Coordinates: 60°10′N 37°38′E
- Primary inflows: Kovzha River, Kema River, Megra River
- Primary outflows: Sheksna River
- Catchment area: 14,000 square kilometres (5,400 mi^{2})
- Basin countries: Russia
- Max. length: 46 km (29 mi)
- Max. width: 33 km (21 mi)
- Surface area: 1,130 km^{2} (440 sq mi)
- Max. depth: 34 m (112 ft)
- Water volume: 6.2 cubic kilometres (2.2×10^{11} cu ft)
- Surface elevation: 113 m (371 ft)

Map of the Rybinsk Reservoir basin. Lake Beloye is shown on the map.

Lake Beloye or White Lake (Russian: Бе́лое о́зеро, IPA: [ˈbʲɛləjə ˈozʲɪrə]; Veps: Vaugedjärv, Valgjärv, lit. 'white lake') is a lake in the northwestern part of Vologda Oblast in Russia. Administratively, the lake is divided between Belozersky District (south) and Vashkinsky District (north) in the oblast. The town of Belozersk is located on its coast. In terms of area, Lake Beloye is the second largest natural lake of Vologda Oblast (behind Lake Onega), and the third largest lake also behind the Rybinsk Reservoir. It is one of the ten biggest natural lakes in Europe.

== Geography ==
The basin of the lake includes parts of Belozersky, Vashkinsky, Babayevsky, and Vytegorsky Districts of Vologda Oblast, as well as minor areas in Kargopolsky District of Arkhangelsk Oblast. Most of the basin lies north of the lake, in the Andoma Hills, and includes smaller lakes, many of them being of glacial origin. These lakes include Lake Kovzhskoye, Lake Kemskoye, Lake Kushtozero, Lake Sholskoye, Lake Druzhinnoye, and, south of Lake Beloye, Lake Lozskoye.

The lake has an approximately round shape with a diameter of 46 kilometres (29 mi). Its area is 1,130 square kilometres (440 mi^{2}), and the area of its basin is 14,000 square kilometres (5,400 mi^{2}). The lake drains into the Sheksna River, which is a tributary of the Rybinsk Reservoir of the Volga River. The Sheksna flows out of the eastern corner of the lake. The main tributaries of Lake Beloye are the Kovzha, the Kema, and the Megra.

The lake and the Belozersky Canal around it are a part of the Volga–Baltic Waterway. The Belozersky Canal was constructed to connect the Sheksna and the Kovzha Rivers in order to bypass Lake Beloye, where sometimes strong wind occur. The canal follows the southern and the western coasts of the lake.

== History ==
According to the Primary Chronicle, Sineus, a brother of Rurik, became the prince of Beloozero in 862. If this would be correct, Belozersk would be one of the oldest towns in Russia. However, most likely Sineus never existed, and the earliest archaeological data in or around Belozersk belong to the 10th century. In the 10th-13th centuries the area was controlled by the Novgorod Republic, then in the 13th century it was part of the Principality of Beloozero, and in the 14th century it entered the Grand Duchy of Moscow. The Mariinsk Canal system was constructed in the early 19th century, and after the reconstruction in the 20th century it became the Volga–Baltic Waterway.

== Economic importance ==
Lake Beloye is located at the intersection of the most important waterways of Russia. The ancient Vytegorsko-Belozersky waterway passed through the lake. At the beginning of the 19th century, the lake became an integral part of the Mariinsky water system. In the XX century, the Volga-Baltic Waterway passed through the White Lake, which inherited the route of the Mariinsky water system.

Wastewater from agricultural and municipal enterprises and the woodworking industry flows into the lake. The main local sources of pollution are located in Belozersk and Lipin Bor. The lake is also used for water supply of settlements lying on its shores.
