= Volga–Baltic Waterway =

Series of canals and rivers in Russia

Coordinates: 59°58′N 30°10′E

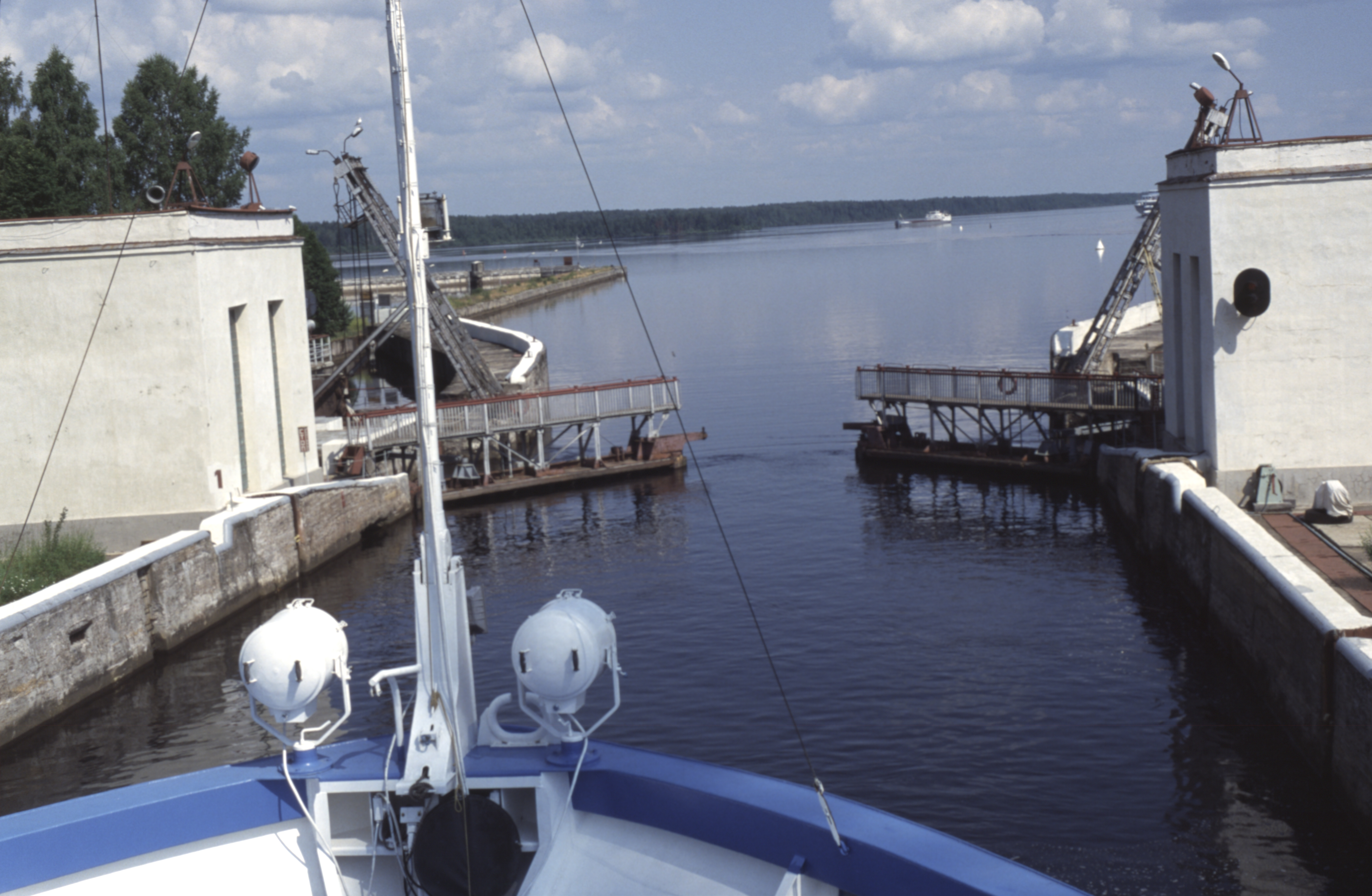
- Volga–Baltic Waterway
- Interactive map of Volga–Baltic Waterway

Specifications
- Length: 229 miles (369 km)
- Maximum boat length: 689 ft 0 in (210.0 m)
- Maximum boat beam: 57.75 ft 0 in (17.6 m)
- Maximum boat draft: 4 m
- Locks: 7
- Status: Open

History
- Former names: Mariinsk Canal System
- Construction began: 1960
- Date of first use: 5 June 1964
- Date completed: 1964

Geography
- Start point: Rybinsk Reservoir, Russia
- End point: Gulf of Finland, Neva Bay, Russia

The Volga–Baltic Waterway (Russian: Волгобалт, romanized: Volgobalt), formerly known as the Mariinsk Canal System (Russian: Мариинская водная система, romanized: Mariinskaya vodnaya sistema), is a series of canals and rivers in Russia which link the Volga with the Baltic Sea via the Neva. Like the Volga–Don Canal, it is part of the Unified Deep Water System of European Russia which connects the biggest lake on Earth, the Caspian Sea, to the World Ocean. Its overall length between Cherepovets and Lake Onega is 368 kilometres (229 mi).

Originally constructed in the early 19th century, the system was rebuilt for larger vessels in the 1960s, becoming a part of the Unified Deep Water System of European Russia.

The original name "Mariinsky" is a credit to Empress Maria Feodorovna, the second wife of Emperor Paul I of Russia.

== History ==
After Peter the Great wrested the southern and southeastern shore of the Gulf of Finland from Sweden, it became desirable to secure a means of river transport for Saint Petersburg on the Baltic with the Russian hinterland. This would shift heavy loads in all but the depths of winter. The prototype (via) Vyshny Volochyok canal, completed by 1709, provided a connection of Saint Petersburg to Lake Ladoga. (The name of the town of Vyshny Volochyok means "upper portage".) The weather on the lake frequently wrecked the barges, however, leading to the ambitious project of the Ladoga Canals into the southern coast of the lake.

Under Alexander I of Russia, the waterway through Vychny Volochyok was complemented by the Tikhvin canal system (1811) and the Mariinsk canal system (1810), the latter becoming by far the most popular of the three.

The Mariinsk was an outstanding monument of early 19th-century hydrotechnics, which proved to be key to national economic prowess. The system started in Rybinsk Reservoir and passed through much of the Sheksna River. It then passed Lake Beloye (and Belozersky bypass canal), Kovzha, its artificial Novomariinsky Canal, the Vytegra to pass through Lake Onega. To or from there vessels sailed through the Onega Canal, the Svir, the Ladoga Canal, and the Neva to or from the Gulf of Finland.

In 1829, the Northern Dvina Canal was opened running to the north-east; it connects the lower Sheksna (one of the Volga's tributaries) through Kubenskoye Lake to a canalised Northern Dvina, flowing into the White Sea. The system was further expanded: three more canals, Belozersky, Onezhsky, and Novoladozhsky, enabling smaller craft to bypass dangerous waters of the three big lakes (Beloye, Onega and Ladoga), were inaugurated towards the end of the century.

Another connection was added in the 1930s, when the White Sea – Baltic Canal was constructed by forced labor between Lake Onega and the White Sea.

== Tourism ==
Since the 1990s the Volga–Baltic Waterway has grown as a tour boat route to sail and/or motor along or around the Golden Ring of Russia.

== Heavy power plant transit ==
In 2016, the core of Astravets Nuclear Power Plant, VVER-1200, which was 330 tonnes, 13 metres (43 ft) high, and 4.5 metres (15 ft) in diameter, was transferred to the plant via the Tsimlyansk Reservoir, the Volga–Don Canal, the Volga–Baltic Waterway, the Volkhov River, and a special rail car.

== Volga–Baltic Canal improvement ==
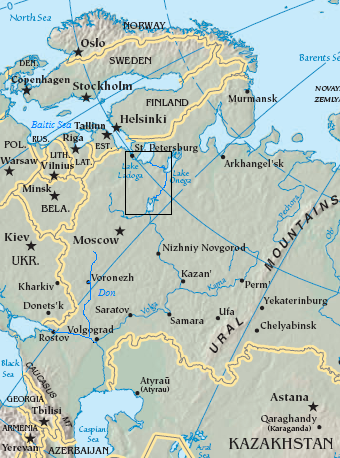
The Volga–Baltic Waterway (boxed area) and the entire Volga River in relation to the Caspian Sea and Black Sea

In Soviet times, the Mariinsk canal system was constantly improved. Two locks were built on the Svir River (in 1936 and 1952); 3 locks were built on the Sheksna River. Major improvement of the Volga–Baltic Waterway took place in 1960–1964, and the new Volga–Baltic Waterway was opened on 5 June 1964. 39 old wooden locks were replaced with 7 new locks, and one parallel lock was built later in 1995. The locks' limiting dimensions are 210 metres (690 ft) long, 17.6 metres (58 ft) wide and 4.2 metres (14 ft) deep, allowing passage of river-sea ships of up to 5000 tons displacement. Such ships were able to sail directly across the big lakes instead of using the bypass canals, greatly improving travel times. For example, the travel time between Cherepovets and Saint Petersburg fell from 10–15 days to 2.5–3 days.

The modern route sometimes follows the route of the old Mariinsk system and sometimes diverges from it. Six of the canal's eight locks are along 35 kilometres (22 mi) of the northern slope, descending 80 metres (260 ft). Only 2 locks (which are parallel) are on the southern slope, for a rise of 13 metres, near Sheksna on the Sheksna River, 50 km upstream from Cherepovets. The canal route on the northern slope follows the Vytegra flooded riverbed. Thus the summit pound of the canal between Pakhomovo locks on Vytegra and Sheksna Reservoir dam is 278 kilometres (173 mi). It comprises an artificial canal that is 40 kilometres (25 mi) long, much of the Kovzha, Lake Beloye, and part of the Sheksna. The route of the southern slope follows the Shekshna, where it parallels the Rybinsk Reservoir.

== Current developments ==
The canal is used for oil and lumber export and for tourism. According to the Maritime Board (Morskaya Kollegiya) of the Russian government, 17.6 million tons of cargo were carried over the Volga–Baltic Waterway in 2004, close to its maximum capacity. The Lower Svir Lock was one of the two busiest locks on Russia's inland waterways (the other one was the Kochetov Lock on the lower Don River).

== See also ==
- Volga–Don Canal
- White Sea–Baltic Canal
- Unified Deep Water System of European Russia
