= Burakovo =

Burakovo may refer to the following rural localities in Russia:

- Burakovo, Kameshkovsky District, Vladimir Oblast
- Burakovo, Kirillovsky District, Vologda Oblast
- Burakovo, Nikolsky District, Vologda Oblast
- Burakovo, Sheksninsky District, Vologda Oblast
