= Tatyanino =

Tatyanino (Russian: Татьянино) is the name of several rural localities in Russia:

- Tatyanino, Vladimir Oblast, a village in Slednevskoye Rural Settlement of Alexandrovsky District in Vladimir Oblast
- Tatyanino, Vologda Oblast, a village in Nikolotorzhskoye Rural Settlement of Kirillovsky District in Vologda Oblast
