= Skokovo =

Skokovo (Russian: Скоково) is the name of several rural localities in Russia.

== Ivanovo Oblast ==
As of 2010, four rural localities in Ivanovo Oblast bear this name:

- Skokovo, Furmanovsky District, Ivanovo Oblast, a station in Furmanovsky District
- Skokovo, Ilyinsky District, Ivanovo Oblast, a village in Ilyinsky District
- Skokovo, Kineshemsky District, Ivanovo Oblast, a village in Kineshemsky District
- Skokovo, Lezhnevsky District, Ivanovo Oblast, a village in Lezhnevsky District

== Moscow Oblast ==
As of 2010, one rural locality in Moscow Oblast bears this name:

- Skokovo, Moscow Oblast, a village in Yershovskoye Rural Settlement of Odintsovsky District

== Pskov Oblast ==
As of 2010, two rural localities in Pskov Oblast bear this name:

- Skokovo, Krasnogorodsky District, Pskov Oblast, a village in Krasnogorodsky District
- Skokovo, Sebezhsky District, Pskov Oblast, a village in Sebezhsky District

== Smolensk Oblast ==
As of 2010, one rural locality in Smolensk Oblast bears this name:

- Skokovo, Smolensk Oblast, a village in Leonidovskoye Rural Settlement of Yelninsky District

== Tver Oblast ==
As of 2010, two rural localities in Tver Oblast bear this name:

- Skokovo, Firovsky District, Tver Oblast, a village in Rozhdestvenskoye Rural Settlement of Firovsky District
- Skokovo, Kimrsky District, Tver Oblast, a village in Pechetovskoye Rural Settlement of Kimrsky District

== Vologda Oblast ==
As of 2010, three rural localities in Vologda Oblast bear this name:

- Skokovo, Babushkinsky District, Vologda Oblast, a village in Podbolotny Selsoviet of Babushkinsky District
- Skokovo, Kirillovsky District, Vologda Oblast, a village in Nikolo-Torzhsky Selsoviet of Kirillovsky District
- Skokovo, Vashkinsky District, Vologda Oblast, a village in Vasilyevsky Selsoviet of Vashkinsky District

== Yaroslavl Oblast ==
As of 2010, five rural localities in Yaroslavl Oblast bear this name:

- Skokovo, Danilovsky District, Yaroslavl Oblast, a village in Semivragovsky Rural Okrug of Danilovsky District
- Skokovo, Poshekhonsky District, Yaroslavl Oblast, a village in Krasnovsky Rural Okrug of Poshekhonsky District
- Skokovo, Rybinsky District, Yaroslavl Oblast, a village in Arefinsky Rural Okrug of Rybinsky District
- Skokovo, Uglichsky District, Yaroslavl Oblast, a village in Ilyinsky Rural Okrug of Uglichsky District
- Skokovo, Yaroslavsky District, Yaroslavl Oblast, a village in Bekrenevsky Rural Okrug of Yaroslavsky District
