= Zapan-Nova =

Zapan-Nova Запань-Нова
- Settlement
- Location within Vologda Oblast Location within Russia
- Coordinates: 59°55′N 38°40′E
- Country: Russia
- Region: Vologda Oblast
- District: Kirillovsky District
- Time zone: UTC+3:00

Zapan-Nova (Russian: Запань-Нова) is a rural locality (a settlement) in Ferapontovskoye Rural Settlement, Kirillovsky District, Vologda Oblast, Russia. The population was 147 as of 2002.

== Geography ==
Zapan-Nova is located 23 km northeast of Kirillov (the district's administrative centre) by road. Nefedyevo is the nearest rural locality.
