= Khmelevitsy =

Khmelevitsy Хмелевицы
- Village
- Location within Vologda Oblast Location within Russia
- Coordinates: 59°58′N 39°01′E
- Country: Russia
- Region: Vologda Oblast
- District: Kirillovsky District
- Time zone: UTC+3:00

Khmelevitsy (Russian: Хмелевицы) is a rural locality (a village) in Nikolotorzhskoye Rural Settlement, Kirillovsky District, Vologda Oblast, Russia. The population was 37 as of 2002.

== Geography ==
Khmelevitsy is located 47 km northeast of Kirillov (the district's administrative centre) by road. Tatyanino is the nearest rural locality.
