= Dorogusha =

Dorogusha Дорогуша
- Village
- Location within Vologda Oblast Location within Russia
- Coordinates: 59°56′N 38°49′E
- Country: Russia
- Region: Vologda Oblast
- District: Kirillovsky District
- Time zone: UTC+3:00

Dorogusha (Russian: Дорогуша) is a rural locality (a village) in Nikolotorzhskoye Rural Settlement, Kirillovsky District, Vologda Oblast, Russia. The population was 10 as of 2002.

== Geography ==
Dorogusha is located 34 km northeast of Kirillov (the district's administrative centre) by road. Bolshoye Korovino is the nearest rural locality.
