= Shchanikovo =

Shchanikovo Щаниково
- Village
- Location within Vologda Oblast Location within Russia
- Coordinates: 59°51′N 38°47′E
- Country: Russia
- Region: Vologda Oblast
- District: Kirillovsky District
- Time zone: UTC+3:00

Shchanikovo (Russian: Щаниково) is a rural locality (a village) in Nikolotorzhskoye Rural Settlement, Kirillovsky District, Vologda Oblast, Russia. The population was 8 as of 2002.

== Geography ==
Shchanikovo is located 30 km east of Kirillov (the district's administrative centre) by road. Gushchino is the nearest rural locality.
