= Maly Dor =

Maly Dor Малый Дор
- Village
- Location within Vologda Oblast Location within Russia
- Coordinates: 59°48′N 38°48′E
- Country: Russia
- Region: Vologda Oblast
- District: Kirillovsky District
- Time zone: UTC+3:00

Maly Dor (Russian: Малый Дор) is a rural locality (a village) in Nikolotorzhskoye Rural Settlement, Kirillovsky District, Vologda Oblast, Russia. The population was 6 as of 2002.

== Geography ==
Maly Dor is located 37 km southeast of Kirillov (the district's administrative centre) by road. Burakovo is the nearest rural locality.
