= Strakhovo =

Strakhovo Страхово
- Village
- Location within Vologda Oblast Location within Russia
- Coordinates: 59°47′N 38°51′E
- Country: Russia
- Region: Vologda Oblast
- District: Kirillovsky District
- Time zone: UTC+3:00

Strakhovo (Russian: Страхово) is a rural locality (a village) in Nikolotorzhskoye Rural Settlement, Kirillovsky District, Vologda Oblast, Russia. The population was 4 as of 2002.

== Geography ==
Strakhovo is located 38 km southeast of Kirillov (the district's administrative centre) by road. Toloknyanitsa is the nearest rural locality.
