= Tikhonovo, Vologda Oblast =

Tikhonovo Тихоново
- Village
- Location within Vologda Oblast Location within Russia
- Coordinates: 59°50′N 38°20′E
- Country: Russia
- Region: Vologda Oblast
- District: Kirillovsky District
- Time zone: UTC+3:00

Tikhonovo (Russian: Тихоново) is a rural locality (a village) in Goritskoye Rural Settlement, Kirillovsky District, Vologda Oblast, Russia. The population was 7, as of 2002.

== Geography ==
Tikhonovo is located 10 km southwest of Kirillov (the district's administrative centre) by road. Bakhlychevo is the nearest rural locality.
