= Chevaksino =

Chevaksino Чеваксино
- Village
- Location within Vologda Oblast Location within Russia
- Coordinates: 60°01′N 38°58′E
- Country: Russia
- Region: Vologda Oblast
- District: Kirillovsky District
- Time zone: UTC+3:00

Chevaksino (Russian: Чеваксино) is a rural locality (a village) in Nikolotorzhskoye Rural Settlement, Kirillovsky District, Vologda Oblast, Russia. The population was 2 as of 2002.

== Geography ==
Chevaksino is located 52 km northeast of Kirillov (the district's administrative centre) by road. Klemenevo is the nearest rural locality.
