= Starodevichye =

Starodevichye Стародевичье
- Village
- Location within Vologda Oblast Location within Russia
- Coordinates: 59°57′N 38°08′E
- Country: Russia
- Region: Vologda Oblast
- District: Kirillovsky District
- Time zone: UTC+3:00

Starodevichye (Russian: Стародевичье) is a rural locality (a village) in Lipovskoye Rural Settlement, Kirillovsky District, Vologda Oblast, Russia. The population was 158 as of 2002.

== Geography ==
Starodevichye is located 45 km northeast of Kirillov (the district's administrative centre) by road. Rogovskaya is the nearest rural locality.
