= Sopigino =

Sopigino Сопигино
- Village
- Location within Vologda Oblast Location within Russia
- Coordinates: 59°55′N 38°46′E
- Country: Russia
- Region: Vologda Oblast
- District: Kirillovsky District
- Time zone: UTC+3:00

Sopigino (Russian: Сопигино) is a rural locality (a village) in Nikolotorzhskoye Rural Settlement, Kirillovsky District, Vologda Oblast, Russia. The population was 55 as of 2002.

== Geography ==
Sopigino is located 32 km northeast of Kirillov (the district's administrative centre) by road. Bragino is the nearest rural locality.
