= Bolshoye Zakozye =

Bolshoye Zakozye Большое Закозье
- Village
- Location within Vologda Oblast Location within Russia
- Coordinates: 59°53′N 38°41′E
- Country: Russia
- Region: Vologda Oblast
- District: Kirillovsky District
- Time zone: UTC+3:00

Bolshoye Zakozye (Russian: Большое Закозье) is a rural locality (a village) in Nikolotorzhskoye Rural Settlement, Kirillovsky District, Vologda Oblast, Russia. The population was 18 as of 2002.

== Geography ==
Bolshoye Zakozye is located 22 km northeast of Kirillov (the district's administrative centre) by road. Dulovo is the nearest rural locality.
