= Bolshoye Korovino =

Bolshoye Korovino Большое Коровино
- Village
- Location within Vologda Oblast Location within Russia
- Coordinates: 59°56′N 38°50′E
- Country: Russia
- Region: Vologda Oblast
- District: Kirillovsky District
- Time zone: UTC+3:00

Bolshoye Korovino (Russian: Большое Коровино) is a rural locality (a village) in Nikolotorzhskoye Rural Settlement, Kirillovsky District, Vologda Oblast, Russia. The population was 41 as of 2002.

== Geography ==
Bolshoye Korovino is located 36 km northeast of Kirillov (the district's administrative centre) by road. Dorogusha is the nearest rural locality.
