= Bolshoye Osanovo =

Bolshoye Osanovo Большое Осаново
- Village
- Location within Vologda Oblast Location within Russia
- Coordinates: 59°55′N 38°47′E
- Country: Russia
- Region: Vologda Oblast
- District: Kirillovsky District
- Time zone: UTC+3:00

Bolshoye Osanovo (Russian: Большое Осаново) is a rural locality (a village) in Nikolotorzhskoye Rural Settlement, Kirillovsky District, Vologda Oblast, Russia. The population was 13 as of 2002.

== Geography ==
Bolshoye Osanovo is located 32 km northeast of Kirillov (the district's administrative centre) by road. Sopigino is the nearest rural locality.
