= Novodevichye =

Novodevichye Новодевичье
- Village
- Location within Vologda Oblast Location within Russia
- Coordinates: 59°57′N 38°07′E
- Country: Russia
- Region: Vologda Oblast
- District: Kirillovsky District
- Time zone: UTC+3:00

Novodevichye (Russian: Новодевичье) is a rural locality (a village) in Lipovskoye Rural Settlement, Kirillovsky District, Vologda Oblast, Russia. The population was 38 as of 2002.

== Geography ==
Novodevichye is located 21 km northwest of Kirillov (the district's administrative centre) by road. Alexeyevskaya is the nearest rural locality.
