= Minchakovo =

Minchakovo Минчаково
- Village
- Location within Vologda Oblast Location within Russia
- Coordinates: 59°55′N 38°52′E
- Country: Russia
- Region: Vologda Oblast
- District: Kirillovsky District
- Time zone: UTC+3:00

Minchakovo (Russian: Минчаково) is a rural locality (a village) in Nikolotorzhskoye Rural Settlement, Kirillovsky District, Vologda Oblast, Russia. The population was 23 as of 2002.

== Geography ==
Minchakovo is located 37 km northeast of Kirillov (the district's administrative centre) by road. Sazonovo is the nearest rural locality.
