= Chebunino =

Chebunino Чебунино
- Village
- Location within Vologda Oblast Location within Russia
- Coordinates: 59°53′N 38°45′E
- Country: Russia
- Region: Vologda Oblast
- District: Kirillovsky District
- Time zone: UTC+3:00

Chebunino (Russian: Чебунино) is a rural locality (a village) in Nikolotorzhskoye Rural Settlement, Kirillovsky District, Vologda Oblast, Russia. The population was 80 as of 2002.

== Geography ==
Chebunino is located 26 km east of Kirillov (the district's administrative centre) by road. Nikolsky Torzhok is the nearest rural locality.
