= Novshino =

Novshino Новшино
- Village
- Location within Vologda Oblast Location within Russia
- Coordinates: 59°52′N 38°54′E
- Country: Russia
- Region: Vologda Oblast
- District: Kirillovsky District
- Time zone: UTC+3:00

Novshino (Russian: Новшино) is a rural locality (a village) in Nikolotorzhskoye Rural Settlement, Kirillovsky District, Vologda Oblast, Russia. The population was 3 as of 2002.

== Geography ==
Novshino is located 34 km east of Kirillov (the district's administrative centre) by road. Stepuchevo is the nearest rural locality.
