= Pustyn, Kirillovsky District, Vologda Oblast =

Pustyn Пустынь
- Village
- Location within Vologda Oblast Location within Russia
- Coordinates: 59°58′N 38°17′E
- Country: Russia
- Region: Vologda Oblast
- District: Kirillovsky District
- Time zone: UTC+3:00

Pustyn (Russian: Пустынь) is a rural locality (a village) in Lipovskoye Rural Settlement, Kirillovsky District, Vologda Oblast, Russia. The population was 385 as of 2002.

== Geography ==
Pustyn is located 46 km northeast of Kirillov (the district's administrative centre) by road. Rogovskaya is the nearest rural locality.
