= Shortino =

Shortino Шортино
- Village
- Location within Vologda Oblast Location within Russia
- Coordinates: 59°53′N 38°23′E
- Country: Russia
- Region: Vologda Oblast
- District: Kirillovsky District
- Time zone: UTC+3:00

Shortino (Russian: Шортино) is a rural locality (a village) in Kirillov Urban Settlement, Kirillovsky District, Vologda Oblast, Russia. The population was 15 as of 2002.

== Geography ==
Shortino is located 4 km northeast of Kirillov (the district's administrative centre) by road. Kirillov is the nearest rural locality.
