= Ust-Sitskoye =

Ust-Sitskoye Устье-Ситское
- Village
- Location within Vologda Oblast Location within Russia
- Coordinates: 59°50′N 38°47′E
- Country: Russia
- Region: Vologda Oblast
- District: Kirillovsky District
- Time zone: UTC+3:00

Ust-Sitskoye (Russian: Устье-Ситское) is a rural locality (a village) in Nikolotorzhskoye Rural Settlement, Kirillovsky District, Vologda Oblast, Russia. The population was 3 as of 2002.

== Geography ==
Ust-Sitskoye is located 32 km east of Kirillov (the district's administrative centre) by road. Duravino is the nearest rural locality.
