= Kukontsy =

Kukontsy Куконцы
- Village
- Location within Vologda Oblast Location within Russia
- Coordinates: 59°53′N 38°45′E
- Country: Russia
- Region: Vologda Oblast
- District: Kirillovsky District
- Time zone: UTC+3:00

Kukontsy (Russian: Куконцы) is a rural locality (a village) in Nikolotorzhskoye Rural Settlement, Kirillovsky District, Vologda Oblast, Russia. The population was 1 as of 2002.

== Geography ==
Kukontsy is located 27 km east of Kirillov (the district's administrative centre) by road. Chebunino is the nearest rural locality.
