= Rogalevo, Kirillovsky District, Vologda Oblast =

Rogalevo Рогалево
- Village
- Location within Vologda Oblast Location within Russia
- Coordinates: 59°50′N 38°56′E
- Country: Russia
- Region: Vologda Oblast
- District: Kirillovsky District
- Time zone: UTC+3:00

Rogalevo (Russian: Рогалево) is a rural locality (a village) in Nikolotorzhskoye Rural Settlement, Kirillovsky District, Vologda Oblast, Russia. The population was 3 as of 2002.

== Geography ==
Rogalevo is located 38 km southeast of Kirillov (the district's administrative centre) by road. Kuryanovo is the nearest rural locality.
