= Ostretsovo, Kirillovsky District, Vologda Oblast =

Ostretsovo Острецово
- Village
- Location within Vologda Oblast Location within Russia
- Coordinates: 59°53′N 38°46′E
- Country: Russia
- Region: Vologda Oblast
- District: Kirillovsky District
- Time zone: UTC+3:00

Ostretsovo (Russian: Острецово) is a rural locality (a village) in Nikolotorzhskoye Rural Settlement, Kirillovsky District, Vologda Oblast, Russia. The population was 1 as of 2002.

== Geography ==
Ostretsovo is located 26 km east of Kirillov (the district's administrative centre) by road. Nikolsky Torzhok is the nearest rural locality.
