= Istominskaya =

Istominskaya Истоминская
- Village
- Location within Vologda Oblast Location within Russia
- Coordinates: 60°00′N 38°59′E
- Country: Russia
- Region: Vologda Oblast
- District: Kirillovsky District
- Time zone: UTC+3:00

Istominskaya (Russian: Истоминская) is a rural locality (a village) in Nikolotorzhskoye Rural Settlement, Kirillovsky District, Vologda Oblast, Russia. The population was 8 as of 2002.

== Geography ==
Istominskaya is located 50 km northeast of Kirillov (the district's administrative centre) by road. Petrovskoye is the nearest rural locality.
