= Chirkovo, Kirillovsky District, Vologda Oblast =

Chirkovo Чирково
- Village
- Location within Vologda Oblast Location within Russia
- Coordinates: 59°46′N 38°50′E
- Country: Russia
- Region: Vologda Oblast
- District: Kirillovsky District
- Time zone: UTC+3:00

Chirkovo (Russian: Чирково) is a rural locality (a village) in Nikolotorzhskoye Rural Settlement, Kirillovsky District, Vologda Oblast, Russia. The population was 4 as of 2002.

== Geography ==
Chirkovo is located 40 km southeast of Kirillov (the district's administrative centre) by road. Strakhovo is the nearest rural locality.
