= Rukino =

Rukino Рукино
- Selo
- Location within Vologda Oblast Location within Russia
- Coordinates: 59°51′N 38°57′E
- Country: Russia
- Region: Vologda Oblast
- District: Kirillovsky District
- Time zone: UTC+3:00

Rukino (Russian: Рукино) is a rural locality (a selo) in Nikolotorzhskoye Rural Settlement, Kirillovsky District, Vologda Oblast, Russia. The population was 120 as of 2002.

== Geography ==
Rukino is located 41 km east of Kirillov (the district's administrative centre) by road. Koshcheyevo is the nearest rural locality.
