= Kochevino =

Kochevino Кочевино
- Village
- Location within Vologda Oblast Location within Russia
- Coordinates: 59°50′N 38°44′E
- Country: Russia
- Region: Vologda Oblast
- District: Kirillovsky District
- Time zone: UTC+3:00

Kochevino (Russian: Кочевино) is a rural locality (a village) in Nikolotorzhskoye Rural Settlement, Kirillovsky District, Vologda Oblast, Russia. The population was 13 as of 2002.

== Geography ==
Kochevino is located 31 km southeast of Kirillov (the district's administrative centre) by road. Savinskoye is the nearest rural locality.
