= Charozero =

Charozero Чарозеро
- Village
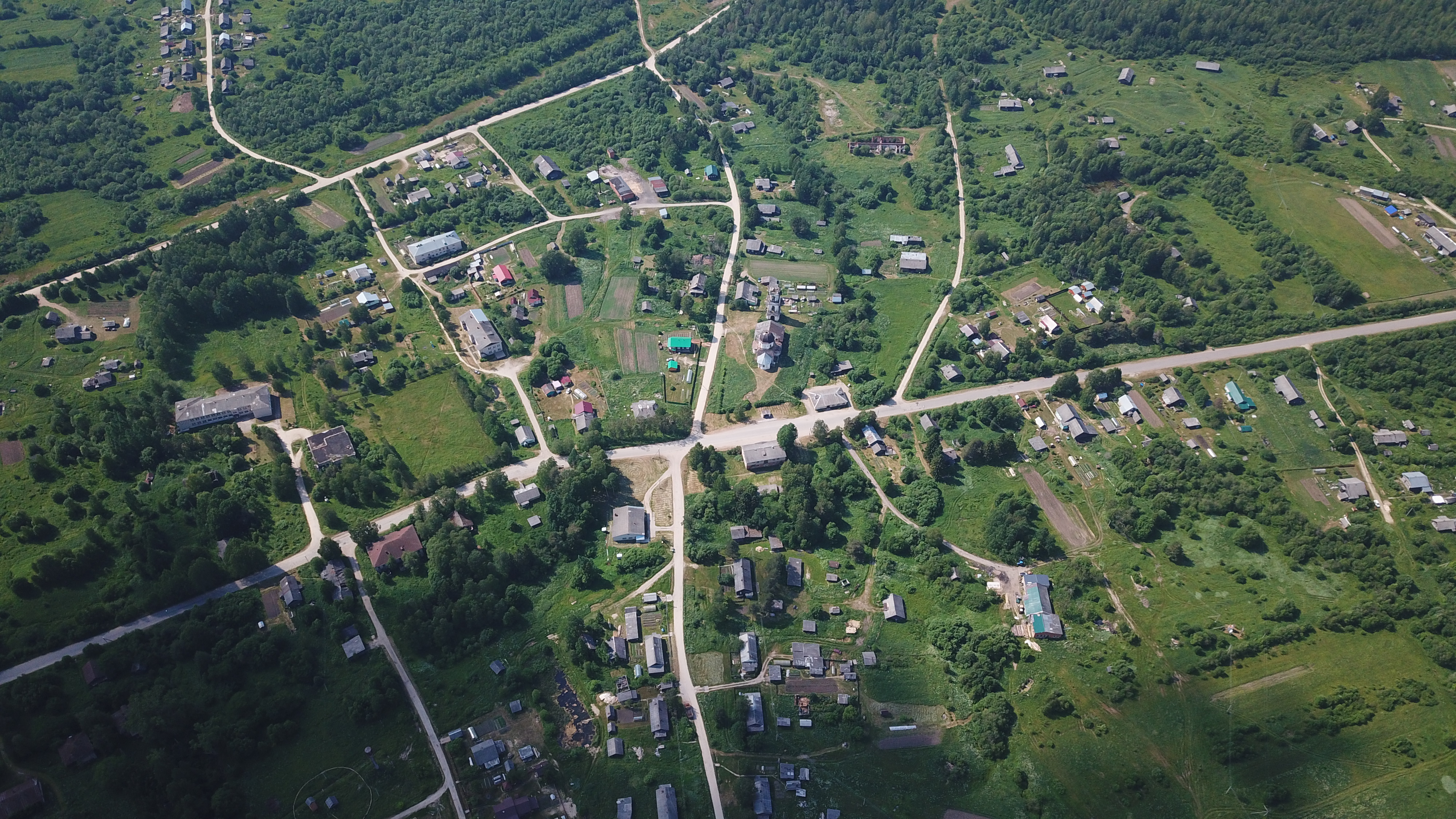
- Birds eye view of Charozero

- Location within Vologda Oblast Location within Russia
- Coordinates: 60°27′25″N 38°38′21″E
- Country: Russia
- Oblast: Vologda
- District: Kirillovsky
- Rural Settlement District: Charozero

Area
  - Total: 1.14 km^{2} (0.44 sq mi)
- Elevation: 144 m (472 ft)

Population (2025)
  - Total: 222
  - Density: 195/km^{2} (504/sq mi)
- Time zone: UTC+3 (MSK)
- Postal code: 161130

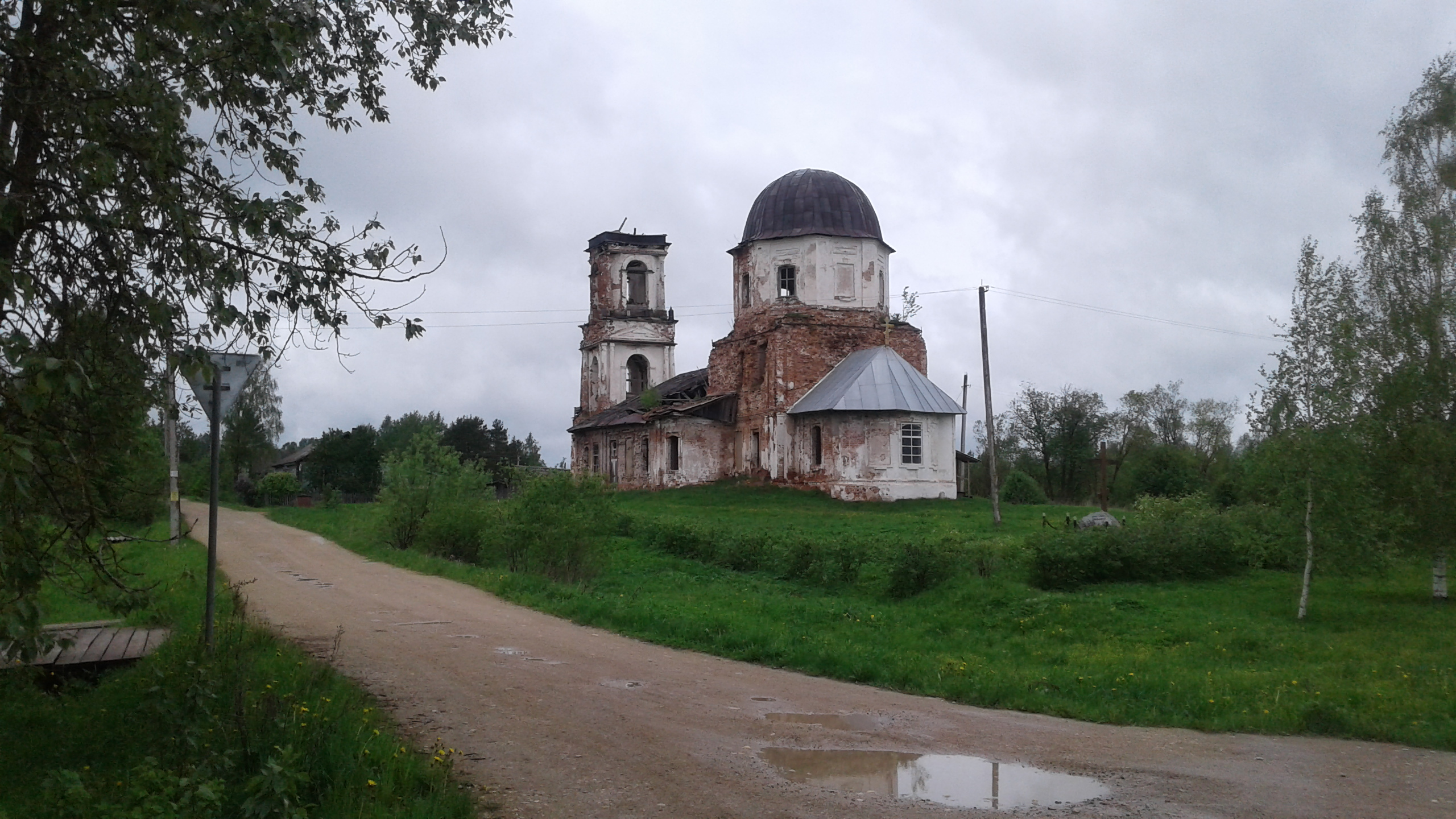
"Peter and Paul" church in the village of Charozero, last built in 1798.

Charozero (Russian: Чарозеро), formerly called Petropavlovskoye until 1931, is a village in Kirillovsky District, Vologda Oblast, Russia. Charozero has its own village council, along with its own rural settlement district (run by Petukhova Nadezhda Nikolaevna) which has existed since the 1930s at the latest. The village has a secondary school, a local government office, a cultural center, a library, a post office, and 15 streets. Roads in and around the village are of poor quality, but the main road leading to Charozero was repaired in 2023, and bus service is now available there.

== Climate and geography ==
Charozero has its own weather station and a subarctic climate with short, cool summers (Köppen climate classification: Dfc). The village is situated in a swampy forest area.

Charozero has distinct seasonal temperature variations. Based on historical weather data, winters are long and cold with January temperatures often dropping below -10 °C, while summers are relatively short and mild with July temperatures typically ranging from 13 °C to 21 °C. The annual average temperature hovers around 2-3 °C. Spring and autumn are transitional seasons with moderate temperatures. The region experiences precipitation throughout the year, with slightly higher amounts during the summer months.

== History and culture ==
=== Political and economic history ===
Historical documents first mentioned Charozero in 1615, when the village was officially established as a human settlement. At the time it was named 'Petropavlovsky Pogost'.

In the late 1900s, the village was reported to have 62 residents and contained administrative buildings, a hospital, postal service, educational facilities, shops, and fairground rows. Regular fairs were held on specific dates (February 2, August 6, November 13–15) and during Great Lent Sundays. Villagers primarily engaged in trade and agriculture.

From 1927 to 1931, Charozero was the center of a former district named 'Petropavlovsky District'. In 1931, the village's name was changed to Charozero from Petropavlovskoye, and accordingly, the name of the Petropavlovsky District was also changed to Charozersky District.

In 1937, Charozersky District became part of Vologda Oblast. Then, in 1955, Charozersky District was abolished, and Charozero became part of Kirillovsky District. On December 17, 1970, by decision of the Vologda Regional Executive Committee, Charozero's village council was abolished, and its territory was transferred to the Pechenga Village Council. Soon after, the Charozero Village Council was restored.

=== Religion ===
The Peter and Paul church in Charozero (also known as Spasskaya Church) is a brick Orthodox church with baroque decor, that was first built before the 17th century and rebuilt in 1798. The church consists of an octagon-on-a-square building with a large two-aisled refectory, a rectangular altar topped with a baroque domed roof, and a free-standing bell tower in the classical style. At the time of construction, altars of the Origin of the Honest Trees (the main one), Florus and Laurus, Paraskeva Pyatnitsa, and Alexander Oshevensky were included. The church was closed in 1931 and used as a warehouse for around 70 years, until restoration work began in the 2000s.

=== Culture ===
Charozero celebrates the Day of Peter and Paul on July 12, as its main religious holiday, inherited from ancestors. This celebration traditionally involves church services, visiting family graves, hosting festive meals, visiting neighbors, and outdoor festivities including singing, dancing, and games. In modern times, this celebration coincides with "Village Birthday" events organized by the cultural center (Charozero House of Culture), drawing former residents back to their homeland.

== Population and economy ==
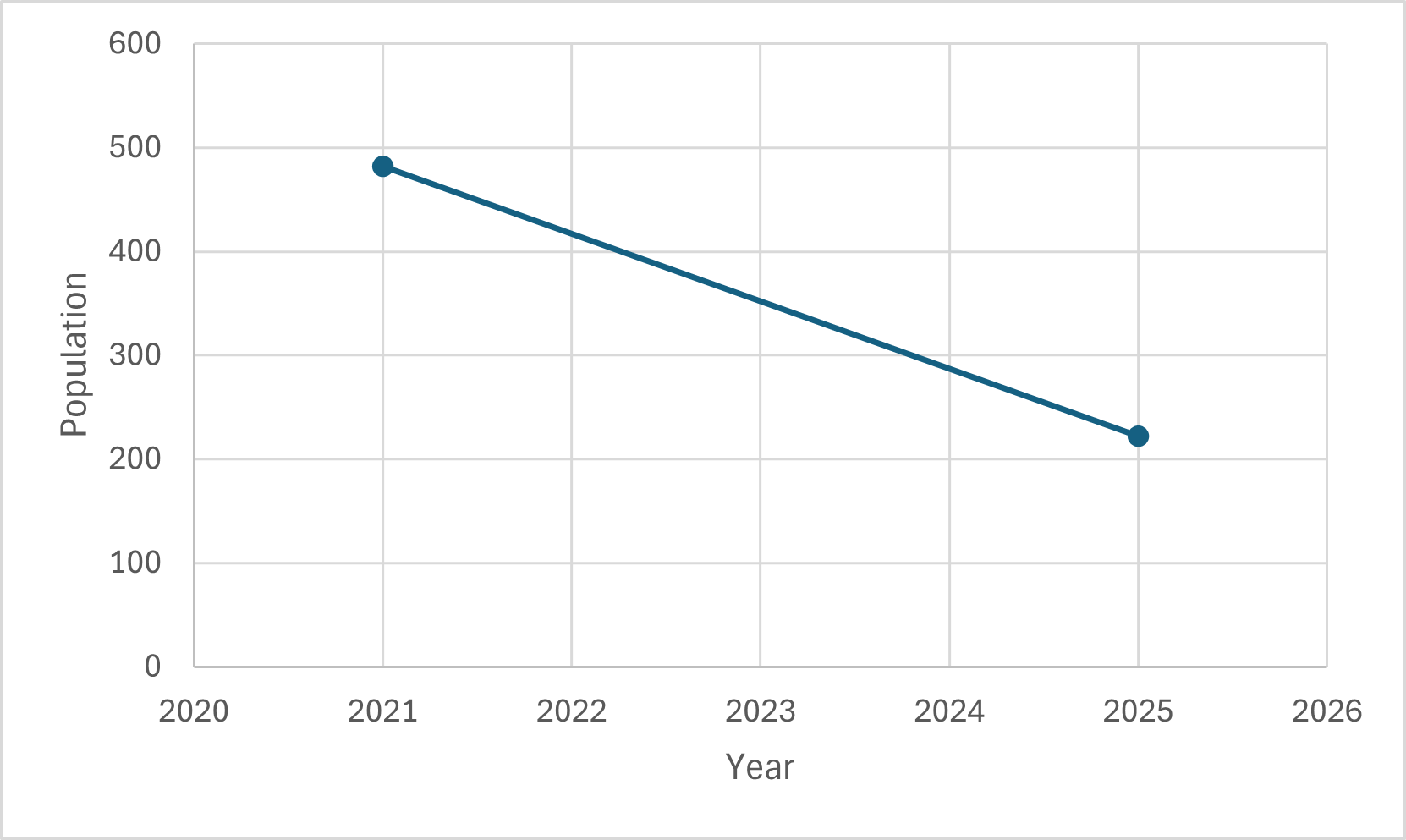
Population chart of Charozero

According to the 2021 census, the village population was 482, with all residents being ethnically Russian. But then the population fell to 222, as of 2025.

=== Demographics ===
As of 2025, Charozero's population had a gender distribution of 99 males (44.51%) and 123 females (55.49%). The population includes 7 children under 6 years old (2.96%), 11 school-aged children between 7–17 years (4.84%), 27 young adults aged 18–29 (11.96%), 102 adults aged 30–59 (46.04%), 64 elderly residents over 60 (28.8%), and 12 residents over 80 years old (5.4%).

The village has a relatively educated population with 20% holding higher education degrees, 1.6% with incomplete higher education, 40.1% with vocational education, 13.9% with complete secondary education (11 grades), 10.8% with basic secondary education (9 grades), and 8.4% with primary education (5 grades). Only 0.4% have no formal education.

Regarding employment, 59.6% of residents (132 people) are officially employed, 29% (64 people) are pensioners, and 5.8% (13 people) are registered as unemployed. The village has 18 residents with disabilities (7.97% of the population), including one child.

This demographic profile shows a relatively aging population with a higher proportion of females, particularly among older residents, where the gender imbalance is most pronounced (80% of residents over 80 are female).

=== Pensions ===
As of 2025, the average pension in Charozero is 25,110 rubles ($313) per month. The pension distribution shows that 62.9% of pensioners receive less than 20,080 rubles ($250), 33.68% receive between 20,080 and 50,210 rubles ($250–626), while only 3.42% receive more than 50,210 rubles ($626).

The village has various types of pensions: old-age pensions average 30,130 rubles ($376), disability pensions 23,850 rubles ($297), survivor's pensions 16,320 rubles ($203), social pensions 22,600 rubles ($282), and military pensions 47,700 ($595). This pension structure reflects the village's socioeconomic conditions, with military pensioners receiving significantly higher benefits than other categories.

These figures provide context to the economic situation of the elderly population, which constitutes nearly 29% of Charozero's residents.

=== Housing ===
As of 2025, Charozero has a modest rental market with affordable housing options compared to larger urban centers in Vologda Oblast. Studio apartments start at 5,010 rubles ($62) per month, one-bedroom apartments at 6,210 rubles ($77), two-bedroom apartments at 8,110 rubles ($101), three-bedroom apartments at 10,980 rubles ($137), and larger apartments at 12,700 rubles ($153).

For house rentals, prices vary by size: houses up to 50 square meters cost approximately 7,540 rubles ($94) monthly, 100 square meter houses at 10,080 rubles ($126), 150 square meter houses at 12,620 rubles ($157), 200 square meter houses at 13,900 rubles ($173), and houses larger than 200 square meters at 15,170 rubles ($189).

The cost of renting a one-bedroom apartment represents about 13% of the average monthly salary in Charozero, while renting a 100 square meter house accounts for approximately 21% of the average salary. This relatively low housing cost-to-income ratio makes Charozero's housing market more affordable than many Russian settlements, though the limited housing availability may present challenges for newcomers.

== Education ==
In 1992, the Kirillovsky district opened Charozero's secondary school using debt funds, and the school has been headed by Akimova Inna Leonidovna from 2013 onwards. Since its founding, the Kirillovsky district treasury has spent 20 million rubles ($250,000) to keep the school running. The municipal government has performed ten inspections on the school (five of which, educational violations were found) and the village school has also undergone 2 arbitration cases amounting to 89,000 rubles ($1,100) in total. 10 students have graduated from the secondary school since its founding, and it has hired a total of 49 educational staff with recognized diplomas.

Charozero also has a small preschool/primary school, considered bureaucratically part of the secondary school, with four employees and three students. The primary school is directed by the same headmaster as the secondary school (Akimova Inna Leonidovna) and administered by Koreshkov Stanislav Vasilievich.

== Notable people ==
- Leonid Alexeevich Shivdyakov (born 1944) - Russian lieutenant general of the Russian military.
