= Skokovo, Kirillovsky District, Vologda Oblast =

Skokovo Скоково
- Village
- Location within Vologda Oblast Location within Russia
- Coordinates: 59°51′N 38°46′E
- Country: Russia
- Region: Vologda Oblast
- District: Kirillovsky District
- Time zone: UTC+3:00

Skokovo (Russian: Скоково) is a rural locality (a village) in Nikolotorzhskoye Rural Settlement, Kirillovsky District, Vologda Oblast, Russia. The population was 32 as of 2002.

== Geography ==
Skokovo is located 29 km east of Kirillov (the district's administrative centre) by road. Nikolsky Torzhok is the nearest rural locality.
