= Srednyaya, Vashkinsky District, Vologda Oblast =

Srednyaya Средняя
- Village
- Location within Vologda Oblast Location within Russia
- Coordinates: 60°19′N 37°50′E
- Country: Russia
- Region: Vologda Oblast
- District: Vashkinsky District
- Time zone: UTC+3:00

Srednyaya (Russian: Средняя) is a rural locality (village) in Kisnemskoye Rural Settlement, Vashkinsky District, Vologda Oblast, Russia. The population was 1 as of 2002.

== Geography ==
Srednyaya is located 14 km northwest of Lipin Bor, (the district's administrative centre), by road. Zadnyaya is the nearest rural locality.
