= Kishemskoye =

Kishemskoye Кишемское
- Village
- Location within Vologda Oblast Location within Russia
- Coordinates: 59°52′N 38°37′E
- Country: Russia
- Region: Vologda Oblast
- District: Kirillovsky District
- Time zone: UTC+3:00

Kishemskoye (Russian: Кишемское) is a rural locality (a village) in Nikolotorzhskoye Rural Settlement, Kirillovsky District, Vologda Oblast, Russia. The population was 11 as of 2002.

== Geography ==
Kishemskoye is located 16 km northeast of Kirillov (the district's administrative centre) by road. Melekhovo is the nearest rural locality.
