= Tatyanino, Vologda Oblast =

Tatyanino Татьянино
- Village
- Location within Vologda Oblast Location within Russia
- Coordinates: 59°57′N 38°59′E
- Country: Russia
- Region: Vologda Oblast
- District: Kirillovsky District
- Time zone: UTC+3:00

Tatyanino (Russian: Татьянино) is a rural locality (a village) in Nikolotorzhskoye Rural Settlement, Kirillovsky District, Vologda Oblast, Russia. The population was 10 as of 2002.

== Geography ==
Tatyanino is located 45 km northeast of Kirillov (the district's administrative centre) by road. Khmelevitsy is the nearest rural locality.
