= Russian ten-ruble banknote =

Currency denomination

Ten rubles
- Country: Russia
- Value: 10 Russian ruble
- Width: 150 mm
- Height: 65 mm
- Security features: Shadow image
- Material used: Cotton
- Years of printing: 1997-2009 2022-present

Obverse
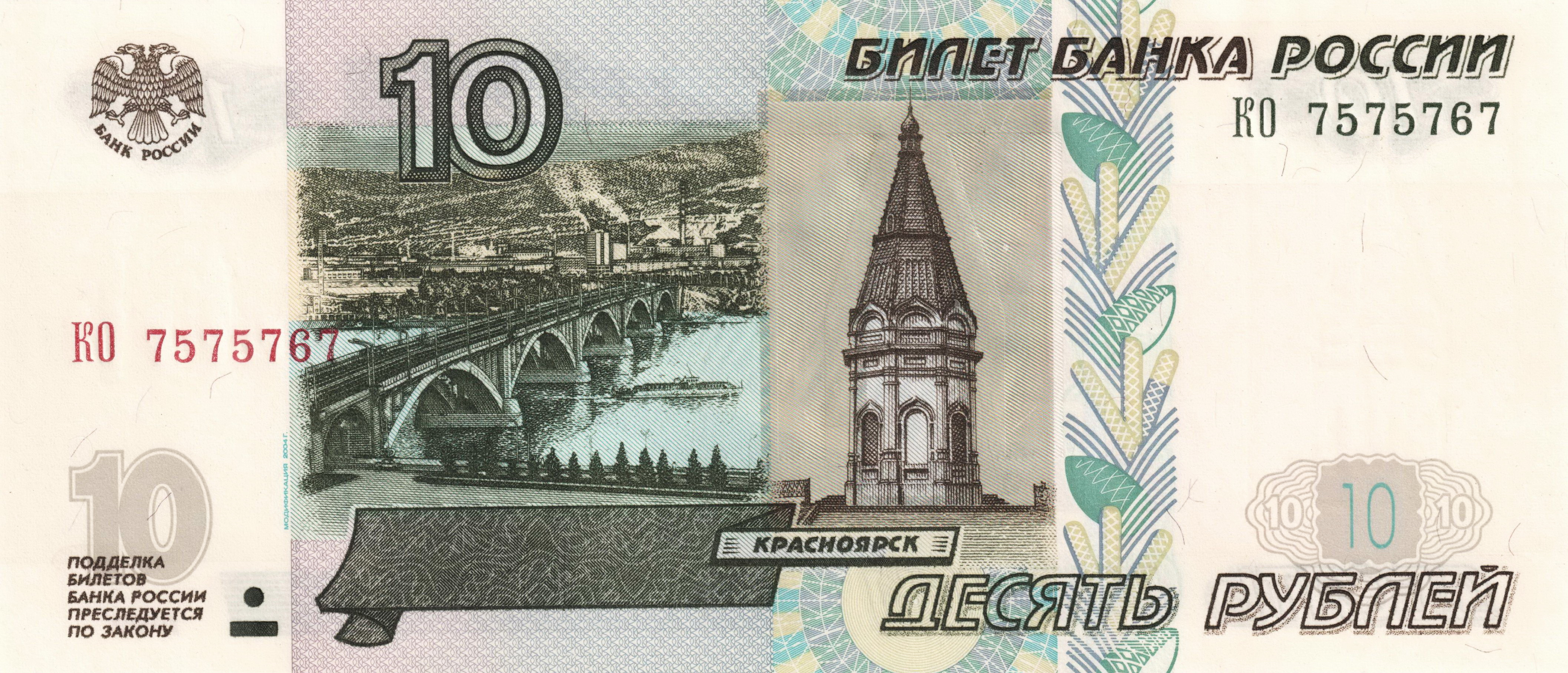
- Design: Kommunalny Bridge across the Yenisey River and Paraskeva Pyatnitsa Chapel

Reverse
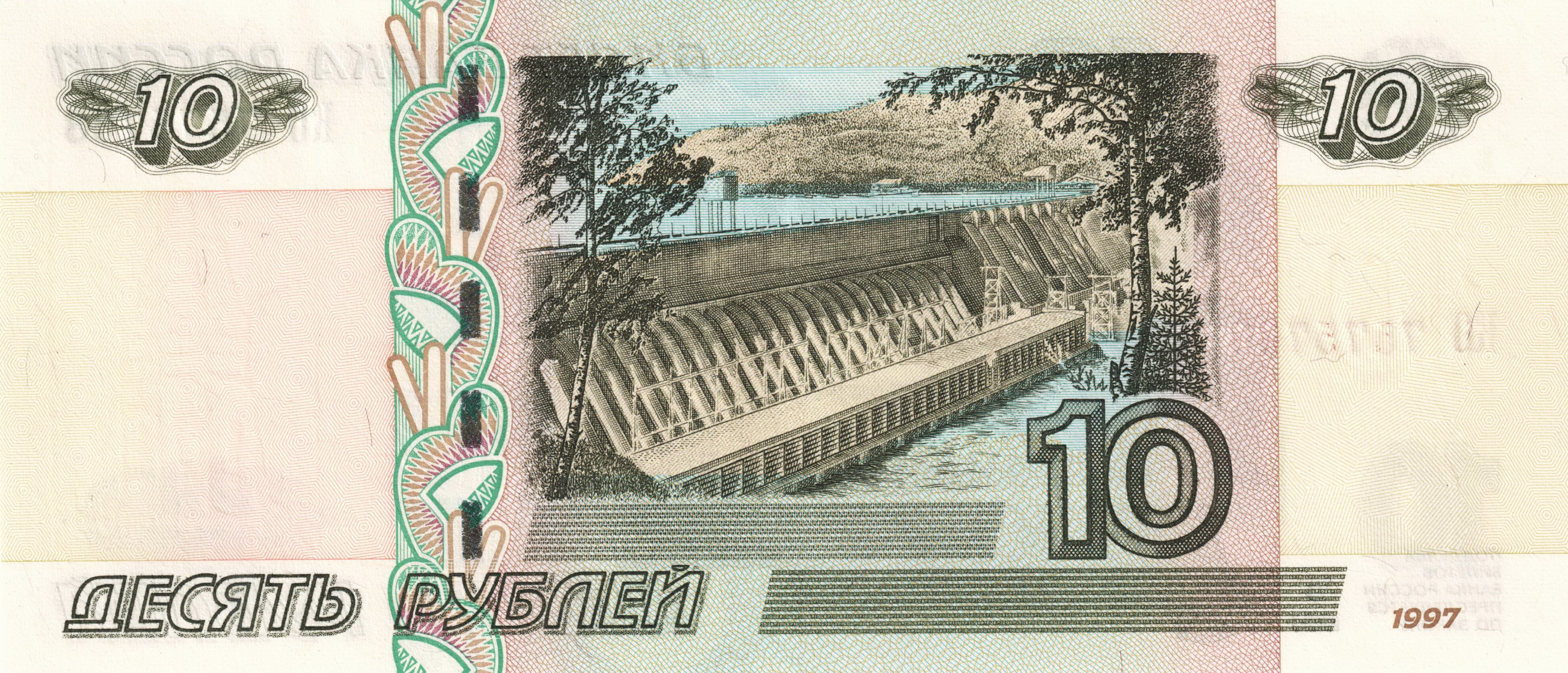
- Design: Krasnoyarsk Hydroelectric Station
- Design date

The Russian ten-ruble note was introduced in the 1998 Monetary reform to replace the 10,000 ruble note, but was discontinued in 2010 due to inflation. The most prominent color is light-brown in the background. The design was changed in 2001 and in 2004.

== Design ==
=== Current Issue ===
The first note was introduced in 1997. The front depicts the Kommunalny Bridge across the Yenisey River and Paraskeva Pyatnitsa Chapel in Krasnoyarsk, which is also the city in the background. On the back is the Krasnoyarsk Hydroelectric Station.

=== 2001 Redesign ===
On the 2001 redesign the main differences is under UV Light the "10" in the lower left corner will glow.

=== 2004 Redesign ===
The main differences are on the 2004 redesign are the randomly colored fibers distributed through the note. It was also added a see-through metallic thread on the back.

== Security features ==
There is a metallic thread on the back. There are two watermarks: on the left is a church steeple, on the right is the denomination "10". A black strip runs through the note; when looking at it from the back, the metallic thread should line up perfectly with the black strip when held up to the light. Next to the church on the bill is a banner; when held up to the light it should match up perfectly to the other side, which has the same design. When tilted at a 45-degree angle, the area around the church steeple should change color; also, when you do it to the horizontal banner on the bottom, the letters "PP" will appear. Under UV Light the threads and the up-and-down strip should glow.

== See also ==
- Russian ruble
