= Paraskeva Pyatnitsa Chapel =

Coordinates: 56°1′25″N 92°51′34″E

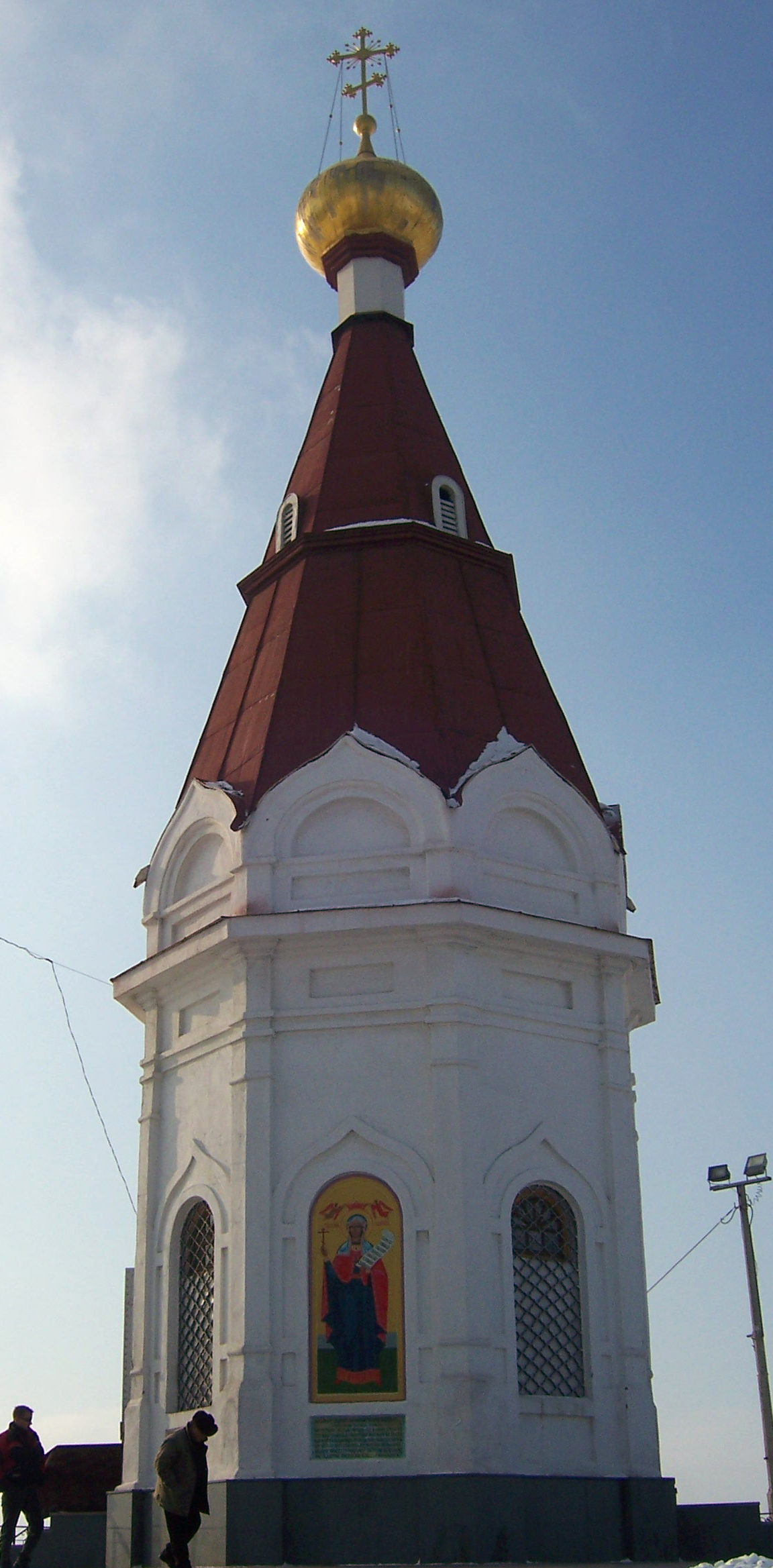
Paraskeva Pyatnitsa Chapel

The Paraskeva Pyatnitsa Chapel (Russian: Часовня Параскевы Пятницы) is a Russian Orthodox Chapel, situated on the top of Karaulnaya Mountain, in Krasnoyarsk, Krasnoyarsk Krai, Russia. It is dedicated to Paraskevi of Iconium (Paraskeva Pyatnitsa).

== History ==
Before the arrival of the Cossacks, a pagan temple of the Tatars was located in the current place of the chapel. The Cossacks placed on the top of the mountain a watchtower to notify citizens about hostile raids.

In 1805 a merchant named Novikov constructed a wooden chapel on that place out of gratitude for being saved from a whirlpool of rapids. Another version about the construction of the building states that the local inhabitants built the chapel due to the deliverance of their ancestors from their enemies. However this building became decrepit after some time.

In 1852 the bishop of Tomsky, Afanasy, gave permission to the city Duma for the building of a stone chapel. Between 1852 and 1855 it was built by architects Ya. Alfeev and Ya. Nabalov from the funds of the prominent owner of gold mines and patron of art, Pyotr Kuznetsov. In 1887 the Russian scientist and radio inventor Aleksander Popov observed the solar eclipse from the chapel. In memory of this in 1977, on the East front of the building a granite memorial plaque was placed.

The chapel was abandoned during the Soviet era. Between 1973 and 1975 the building was restored with the projects of A.S. Brusnikin.

In 2014 the chapel was recoloured to green, according to its historical colour.

== The Paraskeva Pyatnitsa Chapel Today ==
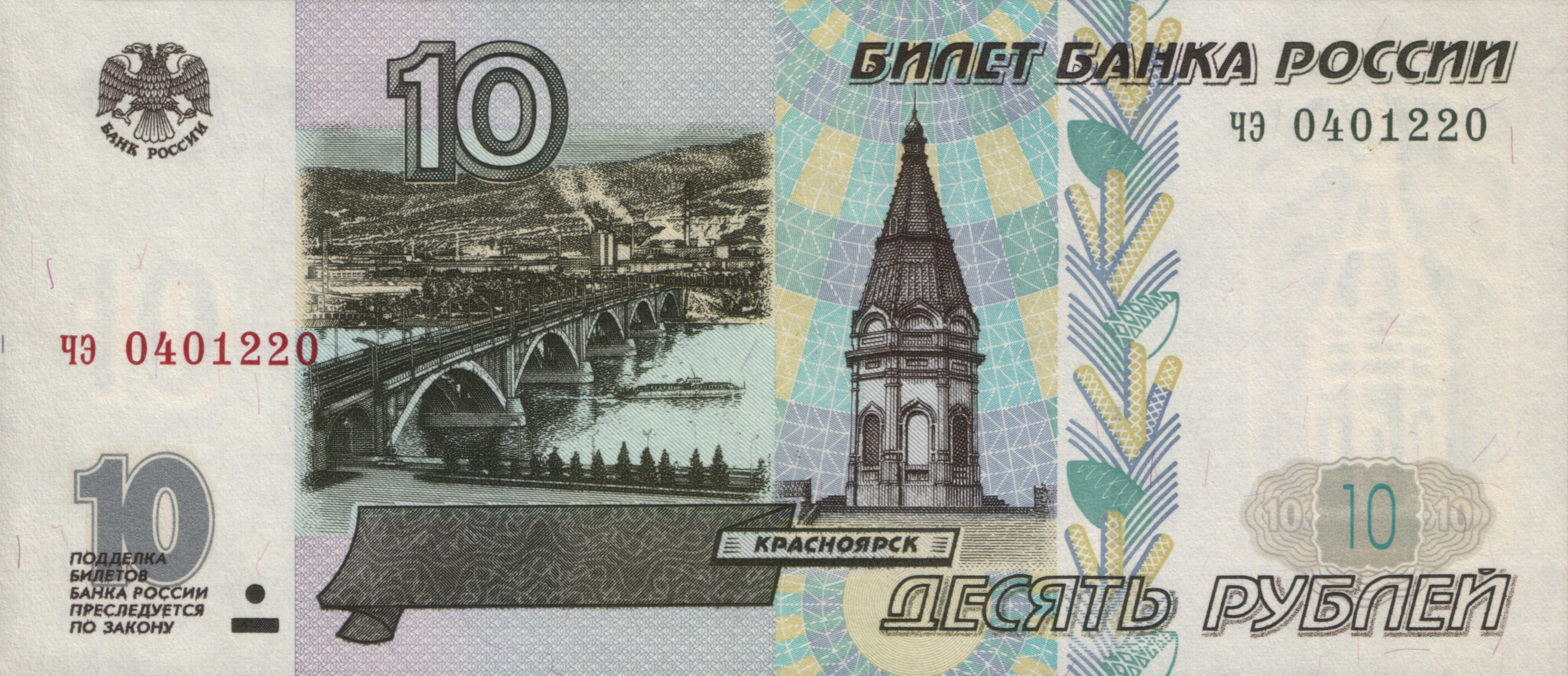
10 rubles banknote featuring an imprint of Paraskeva Pyatnitsa Chapel on the right

Since 1980 the building has been an architectural monument of local significance. It is in fact one of the major symbols of the city. The Chapel is today an important place of pilgrimage by citizens and visitors of Krasnoyarsk. A prominent number of brides and fiancées make their way towards the Chapel to make a declaration of love to each other. The Chapel, as a symbol of the city, decorates the 10-rouble notes.

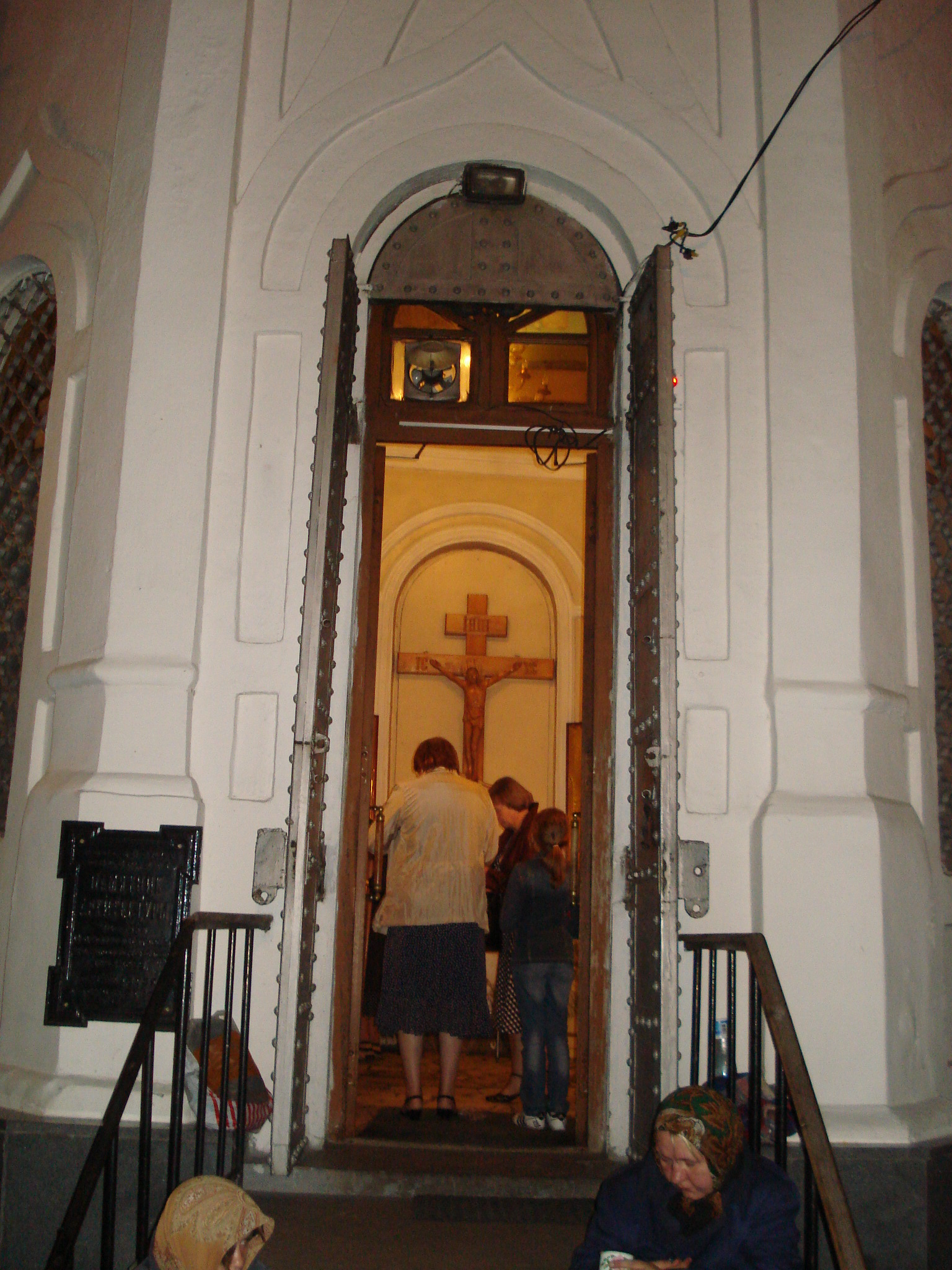
Entrance to Paraskeva Chapel

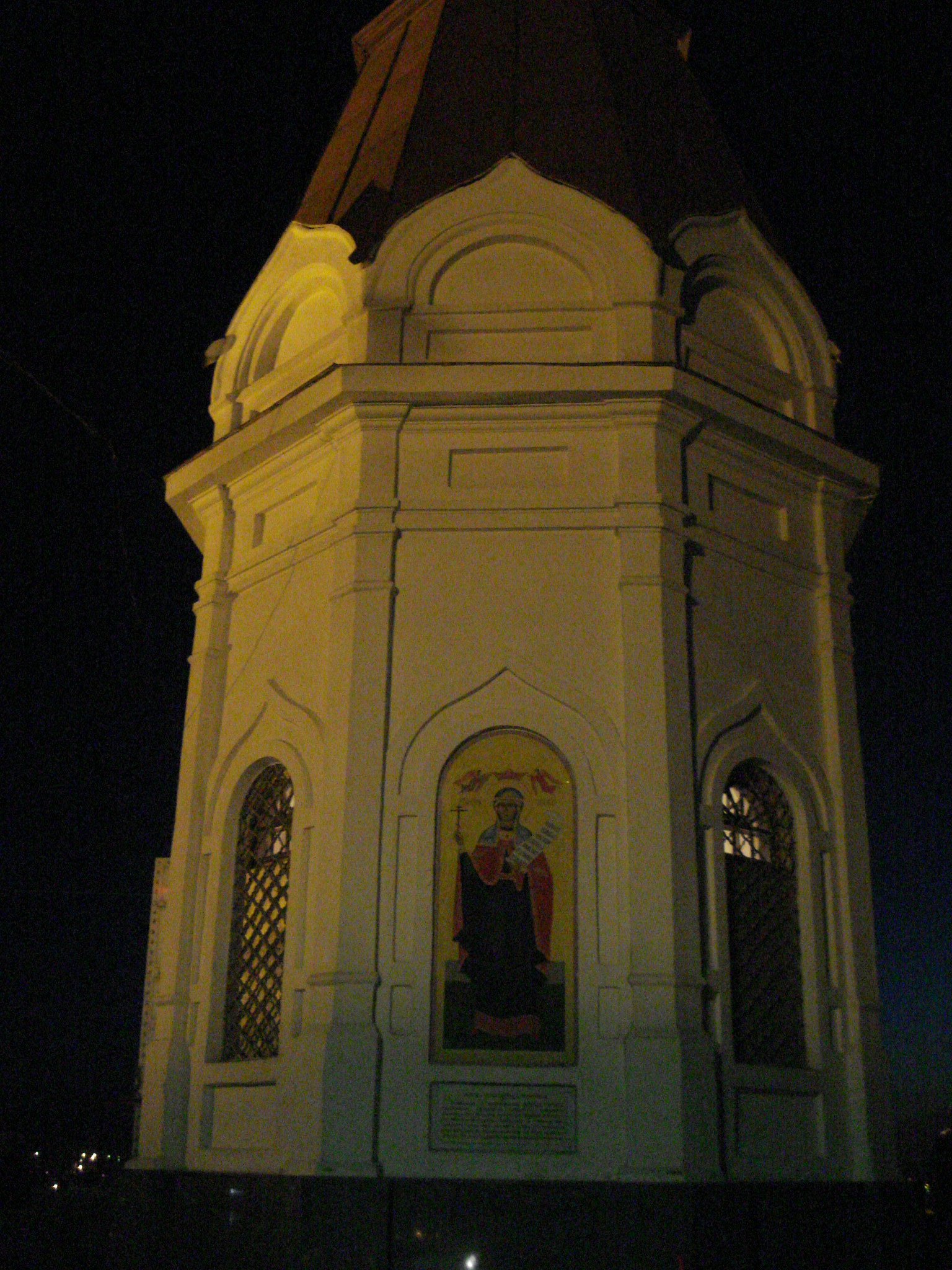
Paraskeva Chapel at night

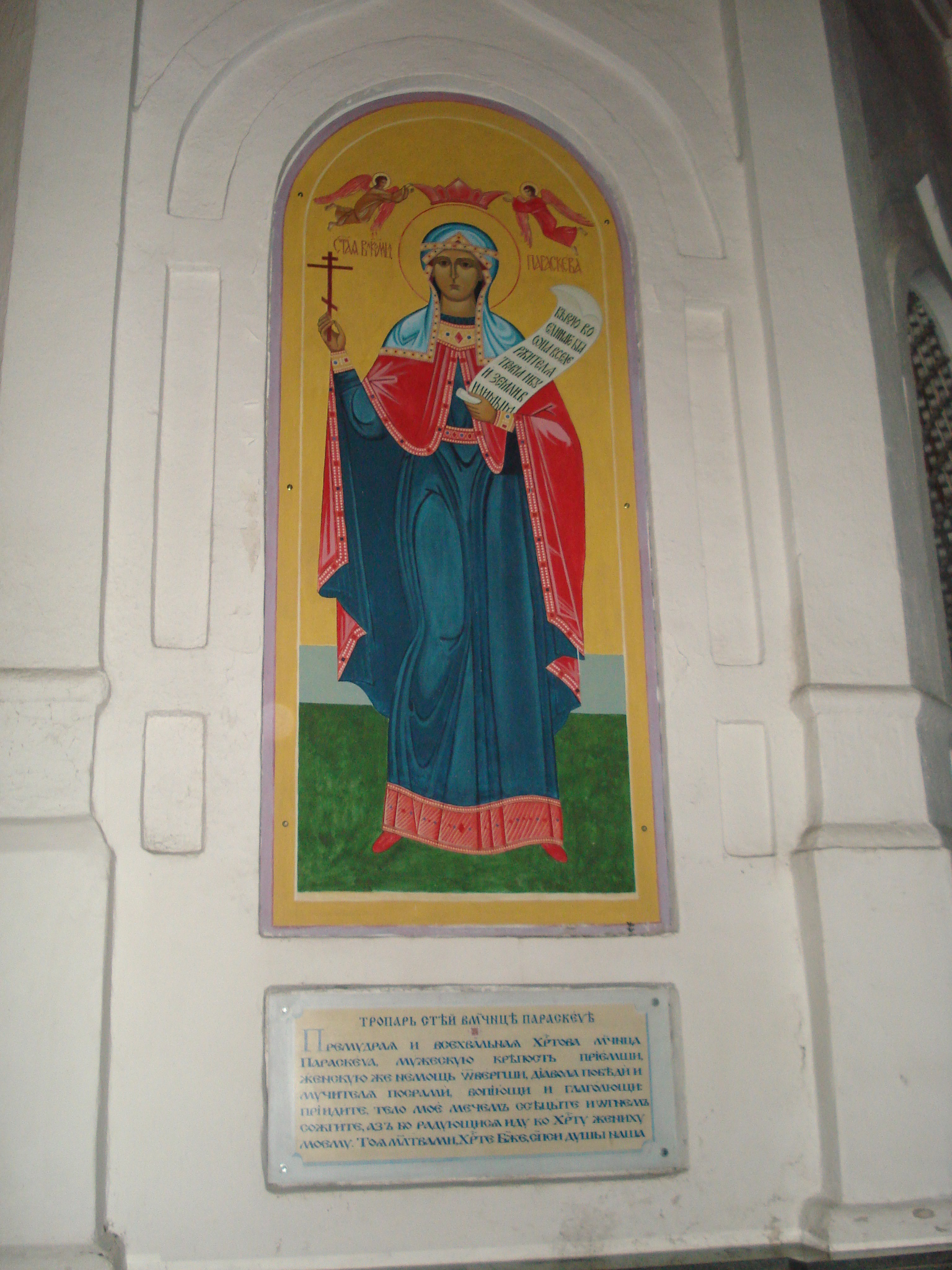
Paraskeva Chapel mural

== Sources ==
- Official Site of the Administration of Krasnoyarsk
