= Burakovo, Kameshkovsky District, Vladimir Oblast =

Burakovo Бураково
- Village
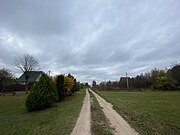
- Burakovo, Sergeikhinskoye, Kameshkovsky District, Vladimir Oblast, Russia

- Location within Vladimir Oblast Location within Russia
- Coordinates: 56°20′N 40°34′E
- Country: Russia
- Region: Vladimir Oblast
- District: Kameshkovsky District
- Time zone: UTC+3:00

Burakovo (Russian: Бураково) is a rural locality (a village) in Sergeikhinskoye Rural Settlement, Kameshkovsky District, Vladimir Oblast, Russia. The population was 17 as of 2010. There is 1 street.

== Geography ==
Burakovo is located on the Nerl River, 39 km west of Kameshkovo (the district's administrative centre) by road. Zapolitsy is the nearest rural locality.
