= Tatyanino, Vladimir Oblast =

Tatyanino Татьянино
- Village
- Location within Vladimir Oblast Location within Russia
- Coordinates: 56°27′N 38°47′E
- Country: Russia
- Region: Vladimir Oblast
- District: Alexandrovsky District
- Time zone: UTC+3:00

Tatyanino (Russian: Татьянино) is a rural locality (a village) in Slednevskoye Rural Settlement, Alexandrovsky District, Vladimir Oblast, Russia. The population was 95 in 2010. There are two streets.

== Geography ==
Tatyanino is located on the Seraya River, 9 kilometres (5.6 mi) northeast of Alexandrov (the district's administrative centre) by road. Grigorovo is the nearest rural locality.
