= Kirillov (town) =

Town in Vologda Oblast, Russia

Kirillov Кириллов
- Town
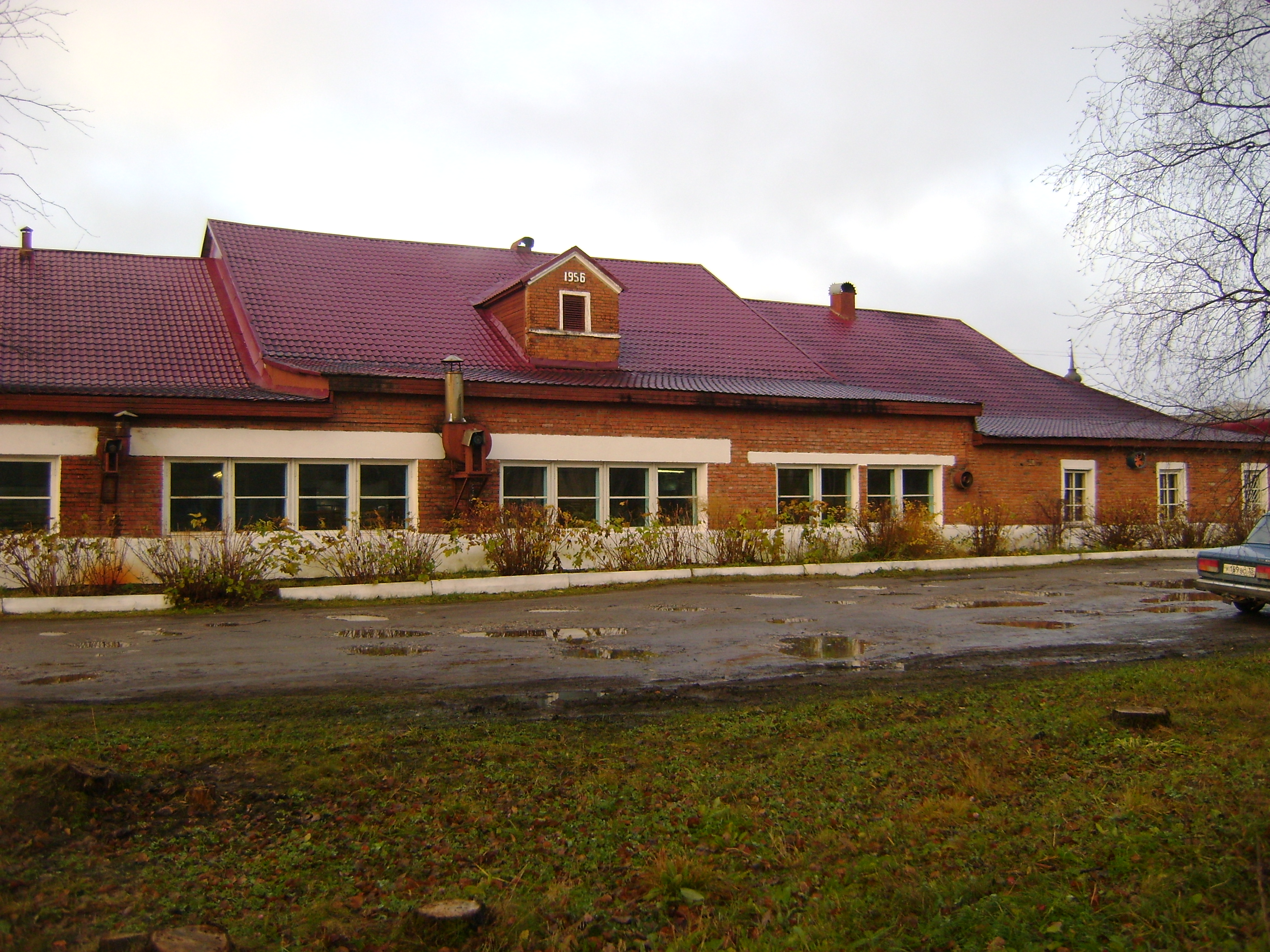
- Bread-making factory in Kirillov

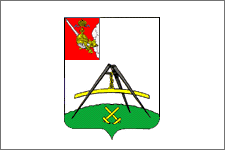
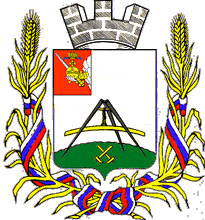
- Flag Coat of arms
- Interactive map of Kirillov
- Location of Kirillov Kirillov (Vologda Oblast)
- Coordinates: 59°51′N 38°23′E
- Country: Russia
- Federal subject: Vologda Oblast
- Administrative district: Kirillovsky District
- Town of district significanceSelsoviet: Kirillov
- Founded: 1397
- Town status since: 1776
- Elevation: 120 m (390 ft)

Population (2010 Census)
  - Total: 7,728
  - Estimate (2023): 7,069 (−8.5%)

Administrative status
  - Capital of: Kirillovsky District, town of district significance of Kirillov

Municipal status
  - Municipal district: Kirillovsky Municipal District
  - Urban settlement: Kirillov Urban Settlement
  - Capital of: Kirillovsky Municipal District, Kirillov Urban Settlement
- Time zone: UTC+3 (MSK)
- Postal codes: 161100, 161101
- Dialing code: +7 81757
- OKTMO ID: 19628101001

Kirillov (Russian: Кири́ллов) is a town and the administrative center of Kirillovsky District in Vologda Oblast, Russia, located on the shores of Lakes Siverskoye and Dolgoye, 129 kilometers (80 mi) northwest of Vologda, the administrative center of the oblast. Population: 7,728 (2010 census); 8,229 (2002 census); 8,817 (1989 Soviet census).

== History ==
In the 13th century, the territory on which Kirillov now stands was a part of the Principality of Beloozero, which was taken over by the Grand Duchy of Moscow in the 14th century. In 1397, St. Cyril of White Lake, a monk and a disciple of St. Sergius of Radonezh, founded the Kirillo-Belozersky Monastery on the shore of Lake Siverskoye. A monastic sloboda, from which the town later grew, developed around the monastery. The monastery was subordinate to Archbishops of Rostov. In the 15th–17th centuries, the monastery developed into one of the most influential monasteries in Russia. It also helped that the Sheksna River was one of the most heavily used waterways connecting central and northern Russia. At some point, the monastery was the second biggest landowner after the Trinity Lavra of St. Sergius. Vasili III of Russia, the Grand Prince of Moscow, and Ivan the Terrible, the Tsar, visited the monastery on several occasions.

In the course of the administrative reform carried out in 1708 by Peter the Great, the territory was included into Ingermanland Governorate (known since 1710 as Saint Petersburg Governorate). In 1727, separate Novgorod Governorate was split off. The territory became a part of Charondsky Uyezd of Belozersk Province of Novgorod Governorate. In 1776, the territory was transferred to Novgorod Viceroyalty. At the same time, Kirillov was chartered and became the seat of Kirillovsky Uyezd. In 1796, the viceroyalty was abolished and the territory was transferred to Novgorod Governorate. Kirillovsky Uyezd was abolished as well; however, it was reestablished in 1802.

In June 1918, five uyezds of Novgorod Governorate, including Kirillovsky Uyezd, were split off to form Cherepovets Governorate, with the administrative center in Cherepovets. On August 1, 1927 Cherepovets Governorate was abolished and its territory became Cherepovets Okrug of Leningrad Oblast. At the same time, uyezds were abolished and Kirillovsky District was established. On September 23, 1937, Kirillovsky District was transferred to newly established Vologda Oblast.

== Administrative and municipal status ==
Within the framework of administrative divisions, Kirillov serves as the administrative center of Kirillovsky District. As an administrative division, it is incorporated within Kirillovsky District as the town of district significance of Kirillov.

As a municipal division, the town of district significance of Kirillov, together with two rural localities in Sukhoverkhovsky Selsoviet of Kirillovsky District, is incorporated within Kirillovsky Municipal District as Kirillov Urban Settlement.

== Economy ==
=== Industry ===
There are enterprises of timber industry and food industry.

=== Transportation ===
Kirillov is connected by all-seasonal roads with Vologda, Cherepovets, Belozersk, and Vytegra. There are also local roads.

The Volga–Baltic Waterway (formerly known as the Mariinsk Canal System), connecting the Rybinsk Reservoir in the basin of the Volga with Lake Onega in the basin of the Neva, runs several kilometers from Kirillov, following the course of the Sheksna River.

In the southern part of the town, one of the locks of the Northern Dvina Canal is located. The canal connects Lake Kubenskoye in the basin of the Northern Dvina with the Sheksna River, thus connecting the basins of the White Sea and the Volga. In the 19th century, the canal was the main waterway connecting the Volga with the White Sea. However, in the 1930s the White Sea – Baltic Canal was built and the Northern Dvina Canal lost its significance. The canal is still in operation, serving cargo traffic and occasional cruise ships moving from the Sheksna to Lake Kubenskoye.

=== Tourism ===
The economy of Kirillov is mainly tourist-oriented. Kirillov has been a tourist attraction since the Soviet times.

== Culture and recreation ==
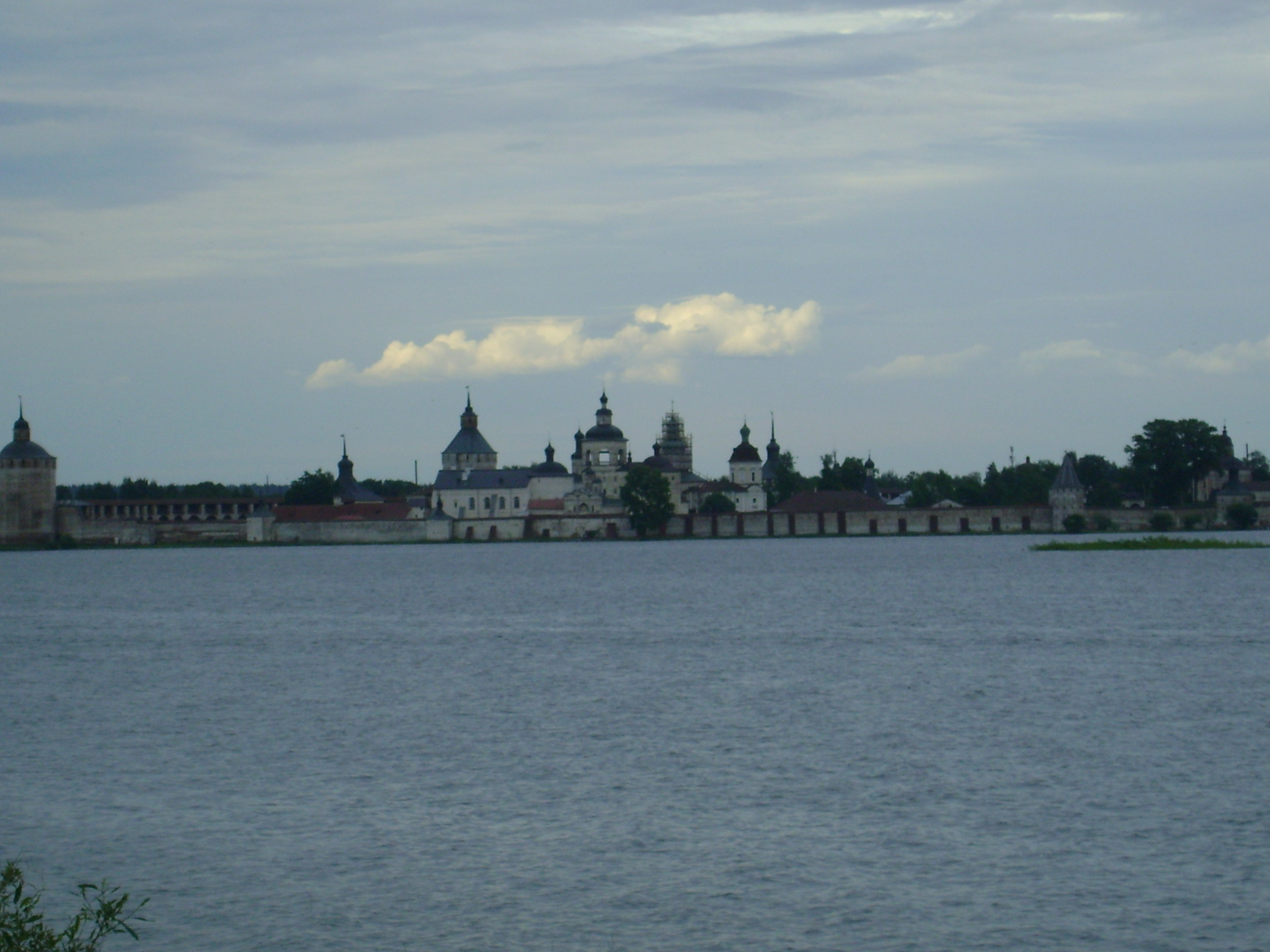
Kirillo-Belozersky Monastery as seen from Lake Siverskoye

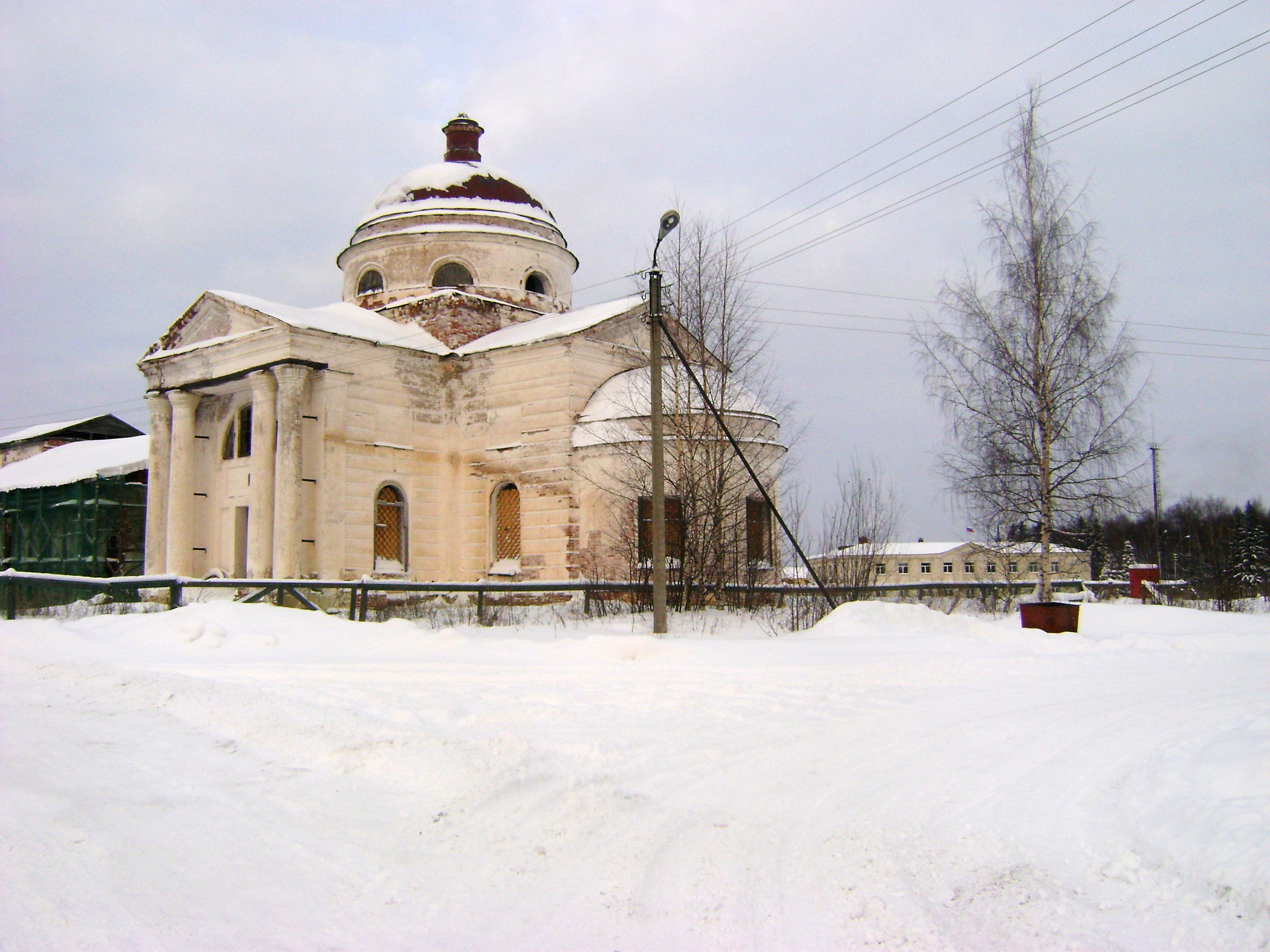
The Cathedral of Our Lady of Kazan outside the walls of the monastery

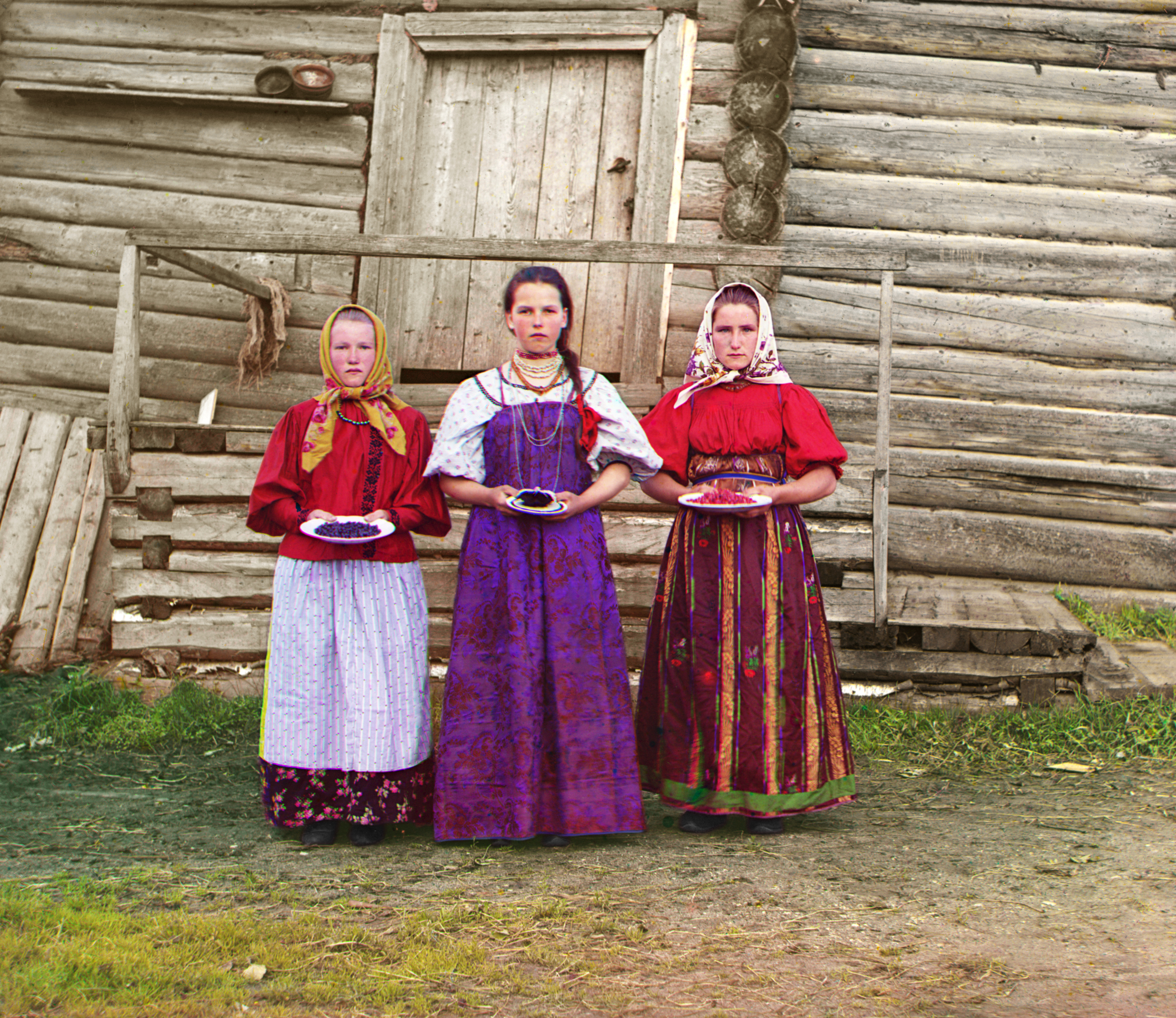
Young peasant women in front of wooden house (ca. 1909 to 1915) taken by Prokudin-Gorskii.

The Kirillo-Belozersky Monastery, located in the town, is a fortified ensemble built in the 15th and the 16th centuries. It also hosts the Kirillo-Belozersky Museum of History, Art, and Architecture—an umbrella institution governing all museums in Kirillovsky District. The monastery has been designated as a cultural heritage monument of federal significance. Kirillov also preserved the historical center and the town hosts seventy-seven cultural heritage monuments, including buildings both in and outside of the monastery.

== Notable people ==
Russian mathematician Dmitry Grave was born in Kirillov in 1863, although he spent his career elsewhere.
