= Kirillovsky District =

Kirillovsky District Кирилловский район
- District
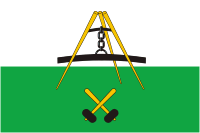
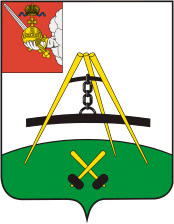
- Flag Coat of arms
- Location of Kirillovsky District in Vologda Oblast
- Coordinates: 59°52′N 38°23′E
- Country: Russia
- Federal subject: Vologda Oblast
- Established: August 1, 1927
- Administrative center: Kirillov

Area
  - Total: 5,400 km^{2} (2,100 sq mi)

Population (2010 Census)
  - Total: 15,877
  - Density: 2.9/km^{2} (7.6/sq mi)
  - Urban: 48.7%
  - Rural: 51.3%

Administrative structure
  - Administrative divisions: 1 Towns of district significance, 15 Selsoviets
  - Inhabited localities: 1 cities/towns, 480 rural localities

Municipal structure
  - Municipally incorporated as: Kirillovsky Municipal District
  - Municipal divisions: 1 urban settlements, 8 rural settlements
- Time zone: UTC+3 (MSK)
- OKTMO ID: 19628000
- Website: http://kirillov.vologda.ru/

Kirillovsky District (Russian: Кири́лловский райо́н) is an administrative and municipal district (raion), one of the twenty-six in Vologda Oblast, Russia. It is located in the north of the oblast and borders with Kargopolsky and Konoshsky Districts of Arkhangelsk Oblast in the north, Vozhegodsky and Ust-Kubinsky Districts in the east, Vologodsky District in the southeast, Sheksninsky District in the south, Cherepovetsky District in the southeast, Belozersky and Vashkinsky Districts in the west, and with Vytegorsky District in the northwest. The area of the district is 5,400 square kilometers (2,100 sq mi). Its administrative center is the town of Kirillov. Population: 15,877 (2010 Census); 18,627 (2002 Census); 21,702 (1989 Soviet census). The population of Kirillov accounts for 48.7% of the district's total population.

== Geography ==
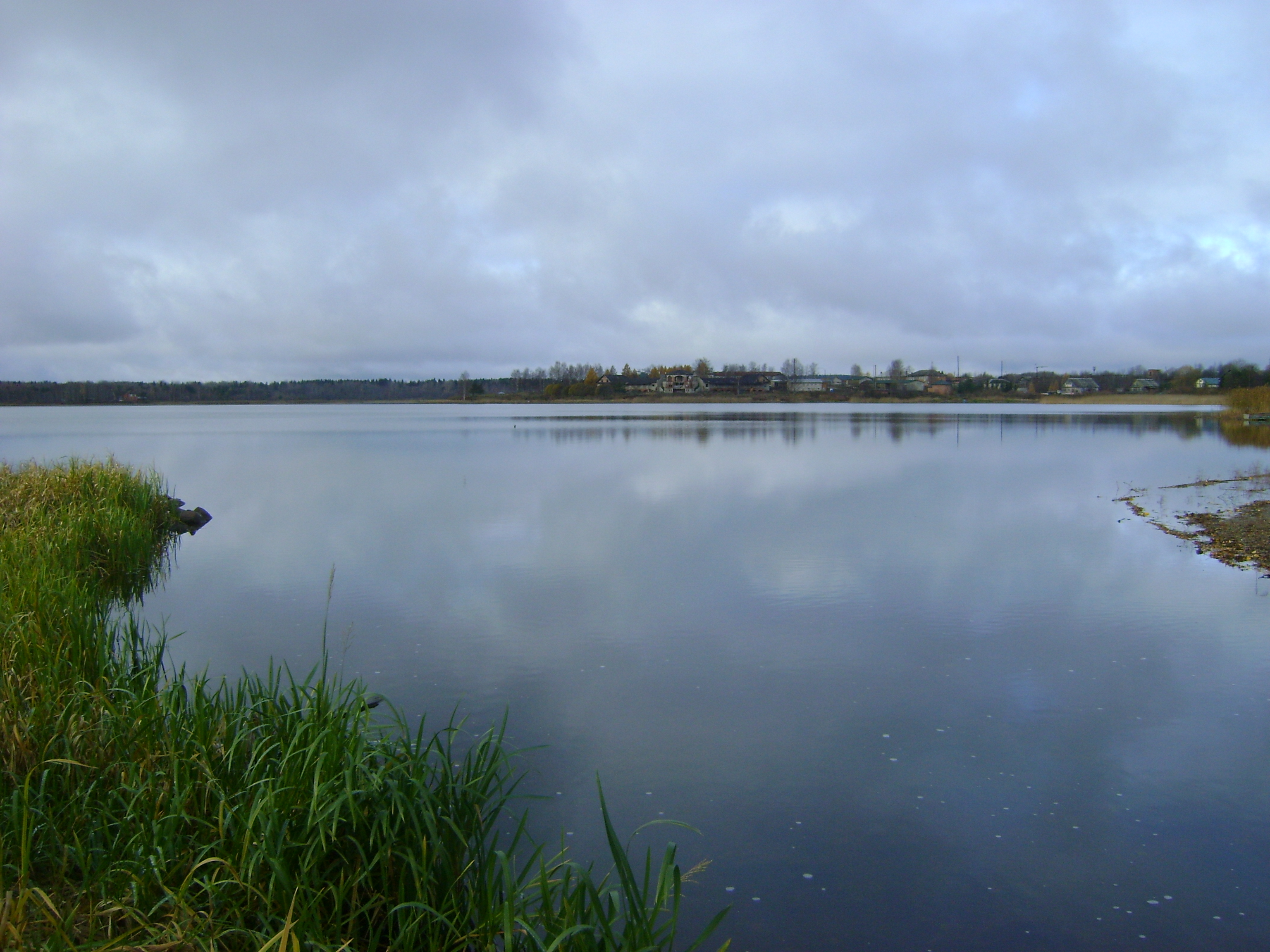
The mouth of Sviyaga River, Lake Siverskoye

The area of the district is elongated from north to south and is split into two roughly equal parts by the divide between the basins of the Arctic Ocean and the Caspian Sea. The area is divided between the basins of three major rivers—the Volga, the Onega, and the Northern Dvina. The northeastern part of the district includes the western half of Lake Vozhe, which Kirillovsky District shares with Vozhegodsky District. The lake, as well as the rivers in the northern part of the district, belongs to the basin of the Onega. The major tributaries of the Onega within the district are the Sovza and the Pereshna. The Sovza flows through Lake Veshchozero, and the Pereshna has its source in Lake Pereshnoye, which is divided between Kirillovsky and Ust-Kubinsky Districts. Areas in the central-east of the district are in the basin of the Porozovitsa River, which belongs to the basin of Lake Kubenskoye and of the Northern Dvina. A stretch of the western border of the district lies on the shore of Lake Beloye; however, no part of the lake belongs to the district. The rivers in the rest of the district drain into the Sheksna, which was made into the Sheksna Reservoir. There are many lakes of the district; among the biggest ones (after Lake Vozhe and the Sheksna Reservoir) are Lake Itkolskoye, Lake Siverskoye, and Lake Zaulomskoye.

The only national park in Vologda Oblast, Russky Sever National Park, is located in Kirillovsky District.

The north of the district, especially the areas around Lake Vozhe, are covered by swamps, the biggest of which is the Charonda Swamp (shared also with Ust-Kubensky and Vozhegodsky Districts).

Forests occupy 67% of the district's territory.

== History ==
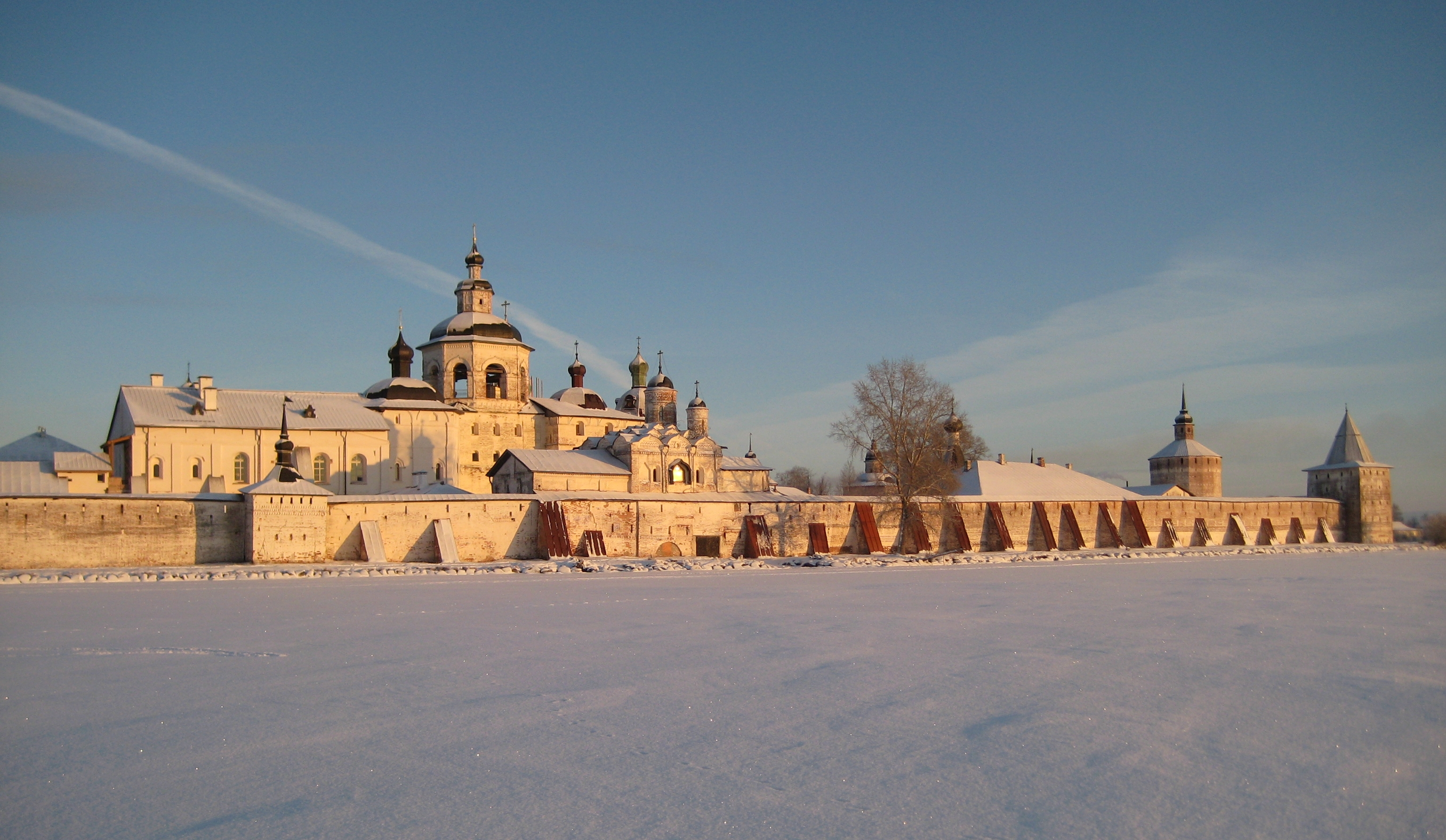
Kirillo-Belozersky Monastery, as seen from Lake Siverskoye

In the 13th century, the area belonged to the Principality of Beloozero, and in the 14th century, together with the rest of the principality, it became a part of the Grand Duchy of Moscow. In 1397, St. Cyril of Beloozero, a monk and a disciple of St. Sergius of Radonezh, founded the Kirillo-Belozersky Monastery on the shore of Lake Siverskoye. The town of Kirillov eventually developed as the posad of the monastery. In 1398, St. Therapont of Beloozero, who arrived with Cyril, moved to a separate location, which later became the Ferapontov Monastery. Both monasteries were subordinate to Archbishops of Rostov. In the 15th and the 16th centuries, Kirillo-Belozersky Monastery developed into one of the most influential monasteries in Russia. It also helped that the Sheksna River was one of the most heavily used waterways connecting central and northern Russia. At some point, the monastery was the second biggest landowner after the Trinity Lavra of St. Sergius. Vasily III, the Grand Prince of Moscow, and Ivan the Terrible, the Tsar, visited the monastery on several occasions. In the end of the 15th century, Nil Sorsky, a former monk of the monastery and a leader of non-possessors movement in the Russian Orthodox Church, founded the Nilo-Sorsky Monastery 15 kilometers (9.3 mi) northwest of Kirillov.

In the course of the administrative reform carried out in 1708 by Peter the Great, the area was included into Ingermanland Governorate (known since 1710 as Saint Petersburg Governorate). In 1727, separate Novgorod Governorate was split off. The area became a part of Charondsky Uyezd of Belozersk Oblast of Novgorod Governorate. In 1776, the area was transferred to Novgorod Viceroyalty. Simultaneously, Kirillov was chartered and became the seat of Kirillovsky Uyezd. In 1796, the viceroyalty was abolished, and the area was transferred to Novgorod Governorate. Kirillovsky Uyezd was abolished as well; however, it was re-established in 1802.

In June 1918, five uyezds of the Novgorod Governorate, including Kirillovsky Uyezd, were split off to form Cherepovets Governorate, with the administrative center in Cherepovets. In 1919, northwestern parts of Kirillovsky Uyezd were transferred into Kadnikovsky Uyezd of Vologda Governorate and Kargopol Uyezd of Olonets Governorate. On August 1, 1927, Cherepovets Governorate was abolished, and its area became Cherepovets Okrug of Leningrad Oblast. Simultaneously, the uyezds were abolished, and Kirillovsky District was established. On September 23, 1937, Kirillovsky District was transferred to newly established Vologda Oblast.

On August 1, 1927, Petropavlovsky District with the administrative center in the selo of Petropavlovskoye and Nikolsko-Torzhsky District with the administrative center in the selo of Nikolsky Torzhok were also established. On July 30, 1931, Nikolsko-Torzhsky District was merged into Kirillovsky District, and Petropavlovsky District was renamed Charozersky District. The selo of Petropavlovskoye was renamed Charozero. In 1937, Charozersky District was transferred from Leningrad Oblast to Vologda Oblast. On December 12, 1955, Charozersky District was abolished, and its area was appended to Kirillovsky District.

== Economy ==
=== Industry ===
The economy of the district is based on timber industry. There is also food industry.

=== Agriculture ===
The agriculture of the district is essentially limited to crop growing and cattle breeding, resulting and meat and milk production.

=== Transportation ===
Kirillov is connected by all-seasonal roads with Vologda, Cherepovets, Belozersk, and Vytegra. There are also local roads.

The Volga–Baltic Waterway (formerly known as the Mariinsk Canal System), connecting the Rybinsk Reservoir in the basin of the Volga River and Lake Onega in the basin of the Neva River, runs through the district, following the course of the Sheksna.

The northern part of Lake Kubenskoye, which belongs to the basin of the Northern Dvina River, is connected by the Northern Dvina Canal with Lake Siverskoye, the town of Kirillov, and the Sheksna River, thus connecting the basins of the White Sea and the Volga. In the 19th century, the canal was the main waterway connecting the Volga with the White Sea. However, in the 1930s the White Sea – Baltic Canal was built, and the Northern Dvina Canal lost its significance. The canal is still in operation, serving cargo traffic and occasional cruise ships, which move from the Sheksna to Lake Kubenskoye.

== Religion ==
The district hosts two acting monasteries of the total four open in Vologda Oblast. These are the Kirillo-Belozersky Monastery (male) in the town of Kirillov and the Goritsky Monastery (female) in the selo of Goritsy, close to Kirillov.

== Culture and recreation ==
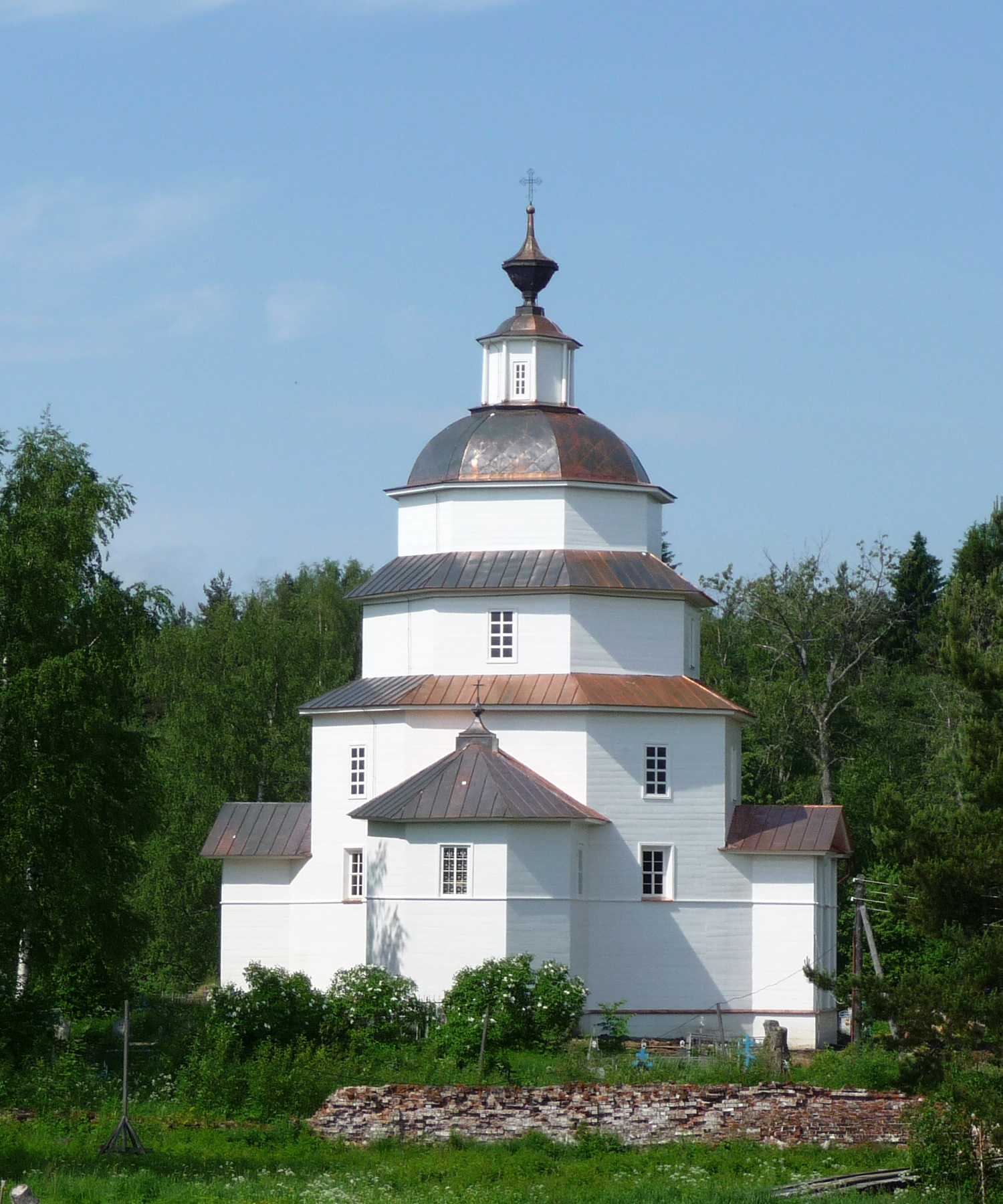
The St. Iliya Church of the Tsypin Pogost

Kirillovsky District preserves a number of medieval ensembles which are considered among the best monuments of art and architecture in Russia. The Ferapontov Monastery is the only World Heritage site in Vologda Oblast. The Cathedral of Nativity of the Virgin (1490) in the monastery is the only remaining Russian church with fully painted walls. The frescoes were carried out by Dionisius. The Kirillo-Belozersky Monastery is a fortified ensemble built in the 15th and the 16th centuries. The Resurrection Church of the Goritsky Monastery also originates from the 16th century.

The district contains 10 objects classified as cultural and historical heritage by Russian Federal law, and additionally 143 objects classified as cultural and historical heritage of local importance. The cultural heritage monuments of the federal significance are the ensembles of the Kirillo-Belozersky, the Gorisky, and the Ferapontov Monasteries, as well as the St. Iliya Church of the Tsypin Pogost and a number of archaeological monuments.

The Ferapontov monastery operates as a museum—The Dionysios Frescoes Museum. All other museums of the district are operated under the umbrella of the Kirillo-Belozersky Museum of History, Art, and Architecture which is located in the Kirillo-Belozersky Monastery. The ensemble of the monastery is shared between the monastery and the museum.
