= Raskopino =

Raskopino (Russian: Раскопино) is the name of several rural localities in Russia:

- Raskopino, Tver Oblast, a village in Sandovsky District of Tver Oblast
- Raskopino, Vologda Oblast, a village in Oktyabrsky Selsoviet of Vologodsky District of Vologda Oblast
