= Raskopino, Vologda Oblast =

Raskopino Раскопино
- Village
- Location within Vologda Oblast Location within Russia
- Coordinates: 59°15′N 39°38′E
- Country: Russia
- Region: Vologda Oblast
- District: Vologodsky District
- Time zone: UTC+3:00

Raskopino (Russian: Раскопино) is a rural locality (a village) in Mayskoye Rural Settlement, Vologodsky District, Vologda Oblast, Russia. The population was 158 as of 2002. There are 3 streets.

== Geography ==
Raskopino is located 10 km west of Vologda (the district's administrative centre) by road. Kuleberevo, Kovyliovo is the nearest village Kozma creek
