= Soletsky District =

Soletsky District Солецкий район (Russian)
- District
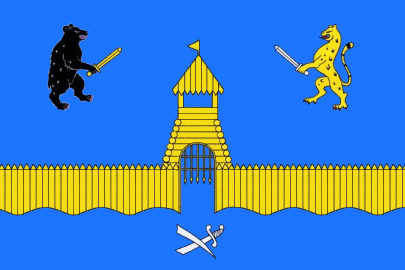
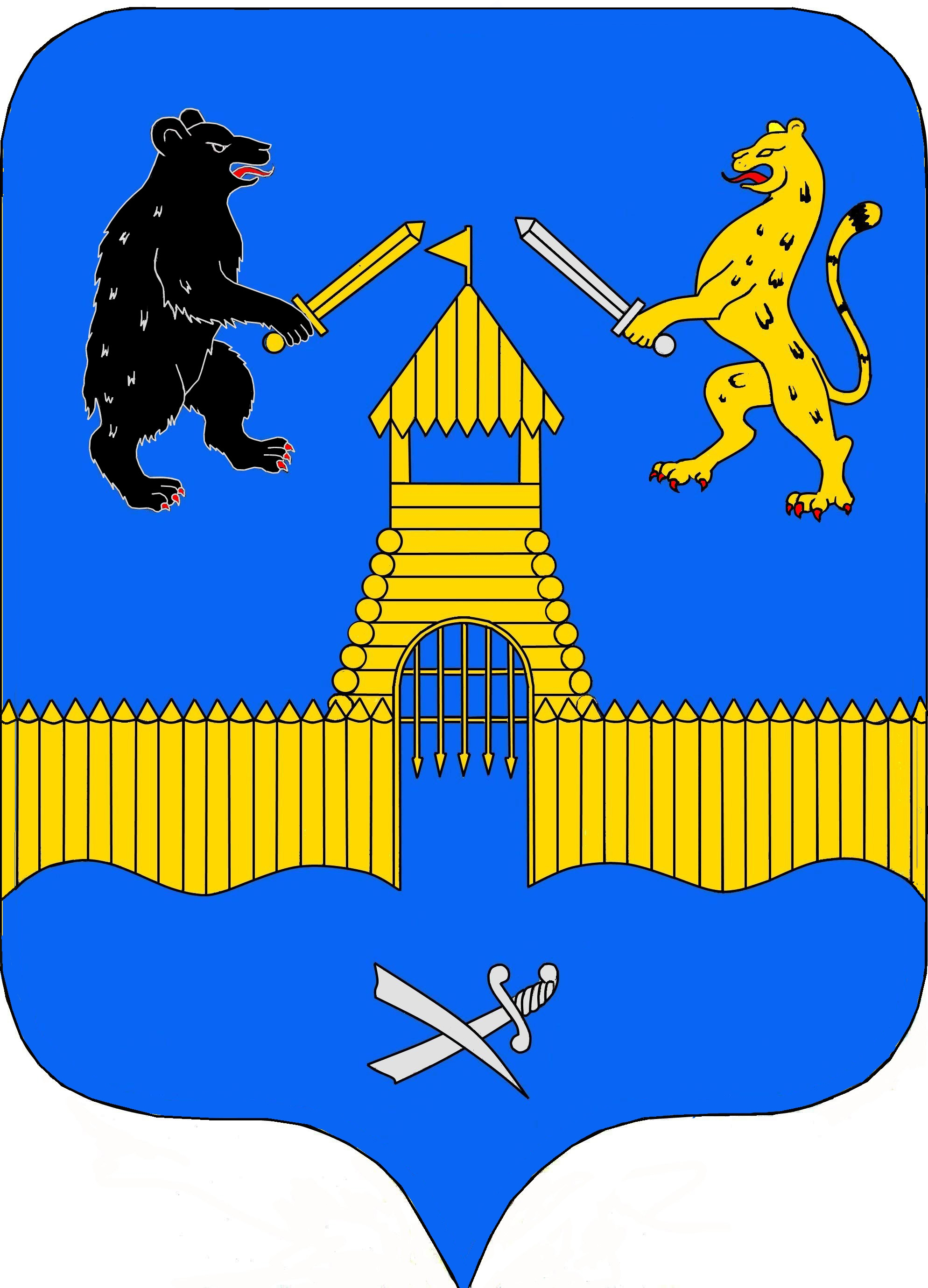
- Flag Coat of arms
- Location of Soletsky District in Novgorod Oblast
- Coordinates: 58°07′N 30°19′E
- Country: Russia
- Federal subject: Novgorod Oblast
- Established: October 1, 1927
- Administrative center: Soltsy

Area
  - Total: 1,400 km^{2} (540 sq mi)

Population (2010 Census)
  - Total: 15,714
  - Density: 11/km^{2} (29/sq mi)
  - Urban: 64.2%
  - Rural: 35.8%

Administrative structure
  - Administrative divisions: 1 Towns of district significance, 3 Settlements
  - Inhabited localities: 1 cities/towns, 172 rural localities

Municipal structure
  - Municipally incorporated as: Soletsky Municipal District
  - Municipal divisions: 1 urban settlements, 3 rural settlements
- Website: http://adminsoltcy.ru/

Soletsky District (Russian: Солецкий район) is an administrative and municipal district (raion), one of the twenty-one in Novgorod Oblast, Russia. It is located in the west of the oblast and borders with Shimsky District in the north, Volotovsky District in the east, Dnovsky District of Pskov Oblast in the south, Porkhovsky District of Pskov Oblast in the southwest, and with Strugo-Krasnensky District of Pskov Oblast in the west. The area of the district is 1,400 square kilometers (540 sq mi). Its administrative center is the town of Soltsy. Population: 15,714 (2010 census); 18,626 (2002 Census); 20,011 (1989 Soviet census). The population of Soltsy accounts for 64.2% of the district's total population.

== Geography ==
Soletsky District lies in the basin of the Shelon River, one of the principal tributaries of Lake Ilmen. Major tributaries of the Shelon inside the district are the Mshaga and the Sitnya (both left), the Lemenka, and the Koloshka (both right). The area of the district is almost flat, with some hills. Forests occupy 7,910 square kilometers (3,050 sq mi), with 94% of the forests being temperate deciduous.

== History ==
Soltsy was first mentioned in a chronicle in 1390 and in the following years played an important role as an intermediate station on the trade route connecting Novgorod and Pskov. In 1471, the army of Ivan III won an important battle over Novgorod on the Shelon River, next to Soltsy. This battle facilitated the submergence of Novgorod by the Grand Duchy of Moscow, and Soltsy eventually fell under its control as well. In the course of the administrative reform carried out in 1708 by Peter the Great, the area was included into Ingermanland Governorate (known since 1710 as Saint Petersburg Governorate). In 1727, separate Novgorod Governorate was split off, and in 1772, Pskov Governorate (Pskov Viceroyalty between 1777 and 1796) was established. In 1776, Porkhovsky Uyezd was transferred from Novgorod Governorate to Pskov Governorate. Soltsy was the seat of Soletskaya Volost of Porkhovsky Uyezd. The area was split between Porkhovsky Uyezd of Pskov Governorate and Starorussky Uyezd of Novgorod Governorate.

In August 1927, the governorates and uyezds were abolished. Soletsky District, with the administrative center in Soltsy, was established within Novgorod Okrug of Leningrad Oblast effective October 1, 1927. It included parts of former Porkhovsky and Starorussky Uyezds. Simultaneously, Soltsy was granted town status. On July 23, 1930, the okrugs were abolished, and the districts were directly subordinated to the oblast. On September 20, 1931, Utorgoshsky District was abolished and merged into Soletsky District. On January 1, 1932, a part of abolished Volotovsky District was merged into Soletsky District, but this was reverted on February 15, 1935 when Volotovsky District was re-established. Also on February 15, 1935, Shimsky District was established with parts of Soletsky District transferred to it, and Utorgoshsky District, previously merged into Soletsky District, was re-established as well. Between July 1941 and February 1944, Soletsky District was occupied by German troops. On July 5, 1944, Soletsky District was transferred to newly established Novgorod Oblast, where it remained ever since. On February 1, 1963, the district was transformed into Soletsky Rural District in the course of the Nikita Khrushchev's abortive administrative reform. At the same time a part of abolished Shimsky District was transferred to Soletsky Rural District. On January 12, 1965, Soletsky Rural District was transformed into a regular district. On February 1, 1973, Shimsky District was re-established, and parts of Soletsky District were transferred to it.

=== Abolished districts ===
Effective October 1, 1927, Volotovsky District with the administrative center in the settlement of Volot was also established as a part of Novgorod Okrug of Leningrad Oblast. It included parts of former Starorussky Uyezd. On January 1, 1932, Volotovsky District was abolished and split between Soletsky, Starorussky, Dnovsky, and Dedovichsky Districts. On February 15, 1935, the district was re-established.

On February 15, 1935, Shimsky District with the administrative center in the selo of Shimsk was also established, as a part of Novgorod Okrug of Leningrad Oblast. It included parts of Novgorodsky, Soletsky, and Starorussky Districts. On July 5, 1944, the district was transferred to newly established Novgorod Oblast. On February 1, 1963, Shimsky District was abolished and split between Soletsky and Starorussky Rural Districts. On February 1, 1973, the district was re-established.

Another district established effective October 1, 1927 was Utorgoshsky District, which was a part of Luga Okrug of Leningrad Oblast and had its administrative center in the railway station of Utorgosh. It included parts of former Luzhsky Uyezd of Petrograd Governorate. On September 20, 1931, Utorgoshsky District was abolished and merged into Soletsky District. On February 15, 1935, it was re-established, and on July 5, 1944 transferred to newly established Novgorod Oblast. On December 10, 1962, the district was abolished and merged into Soletsky Rural District. After a number of administrative transformations, its territory ended up divided between Soletsky and Shimsky Districts.

== Economy ==
=== Industry ===
The main branches of industry in the district are electronic industry and food industry.

=== Agriculture ===
Agriculture is the main branch of economy of the district. As of 2011, there were nine large-scale farms and twenty mid-scale private farms. The main agricultural specializations in Soletsky District are meat, milk, and eggs production.

=== Transportation ===
The railway connecting St. Petersburg and Nevel via Dno crosses the district from north to south, running close to Soltsy. The railway connecting Bologoye to Pskov via Staraya Russa crosses the southern tip of the district; however, there are no significant stations on this line within the district.

Soltsy is connected by roads to Veliky Novgorod via Shimsk, to Staraya Russa via Volot, and to Dno.

The Shelon is navigable downstream of Soltsy; however, there is no passenger navigation.

== Culture and recreation ==
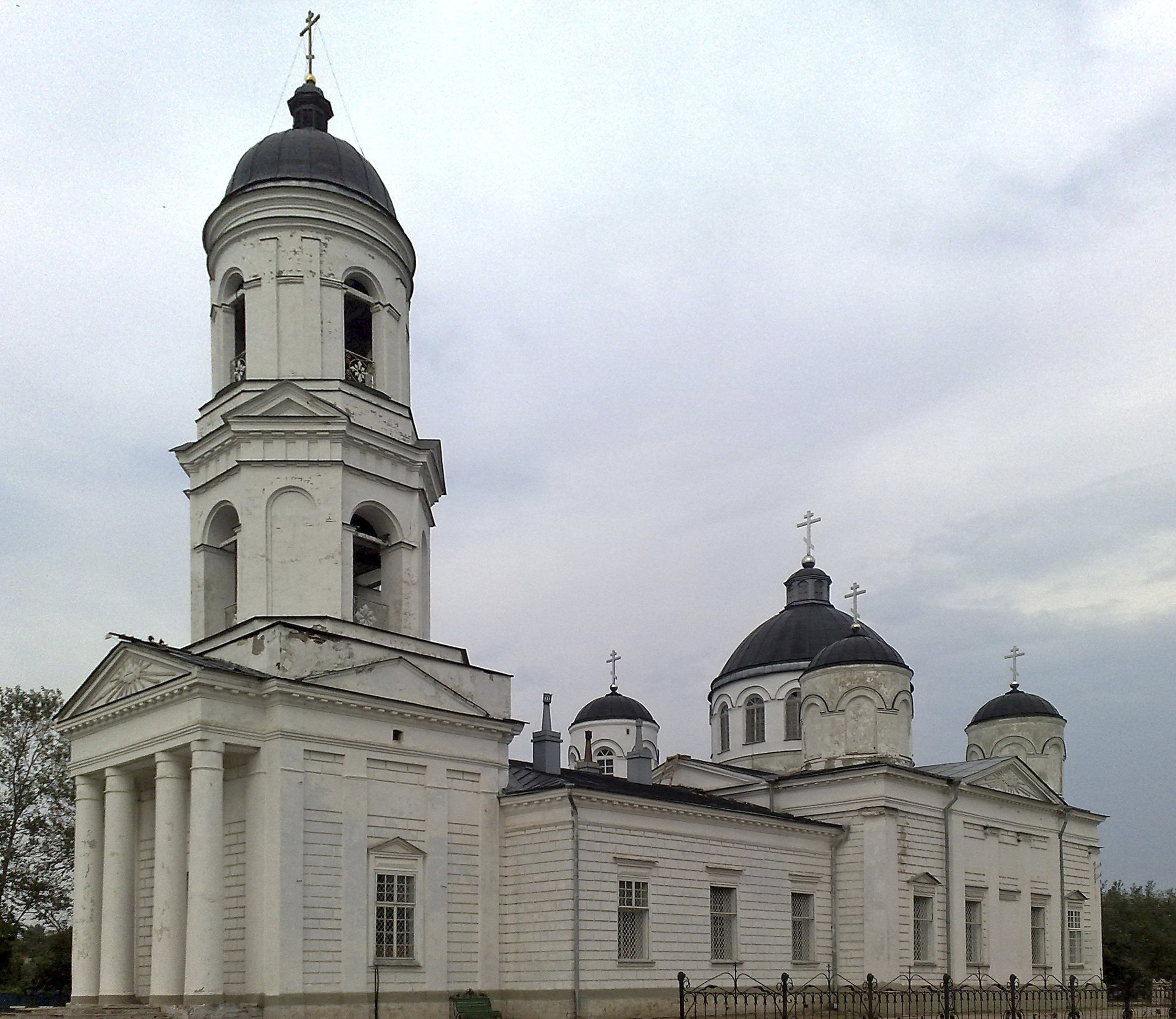
Saint Ilia Cathedral in Soltsy

The district contains 2 cultural heritage monuments of federal significance and additionally 137 objects classified as cultural and historical heritage of local significance, 51 of which are in Soltsy. The federal monuments are the archaeological site "Gorodok" in the village of Gorodok and the Saint Ilia Cathedral in Soltsy.

The Soletsky District Museum is located in the town of Soltsy. It exhibits collections of local interest.

== Notable residents ==
- Boris Vasilchikov (1863 in Vybiti – 1931), politician
