= Flag of Novgorod Oblast =

- Use: Civil flag
- Proportion: 2:3
- Adopted: 24 December 2007

The flag of Novgorod Oblast was adopted on 24 December 2007.

Flag of the Novgorod region is rectangular with a ratio of 2:3, which consists of three vertical stripes, being similar to the flag of France, with each other as 1: 2: 1, blue (hoist), white (middle), and red. In the center of the white band is a shield similar to that found in the coat of arms of the oblast. The shield ratio is equal to 1/4 full length.

== Historical flags ==
Flag	Date	Use	description
	?–2007	Unofficial flag of Novgorod Oblast	

== Other flags ==
Flag	Date	Use	description
	1994–present	Flag of Veliky Novgorod	
	?–1994	Flag of Veliky Novgorod	
	2005–present	Flag of Borovichi	
	?–2005	Flag of Borovichi	
	?–Present	Flag of Staraya Russa	
	?–Present	Flag of Batetsky District	
	?–Present	Flag of Borovichsky District	
	?–Present	Flag of Valdaysky District	
	?–Present	Flag of Volotovsky District	
	2005–Present	Flag of Demyansky District	
	?–2005	Flag of Demyansky District	
	2005–Present	Flag of Krestetsky District	
	?–2005	Flag of Krestetsky District	
	?–Present	Flag of Lyubytinsky District	
	?–Present	Flag of Malovishersky District	
	?–Present	Flag of Moshenskoy District	
	?–Present	Flag of Novgorodsky District	
	?–Present	Flag of Poddorsky District	
	?–Present	Flag of Soletsky District	
	?–Present	Flag of Starorussky District	
	?–Present	Flag of Khvoyninsky District	
	1997–Present	Flag of Chudovsky District	
	?–1997	Flag of Chudovsky District	
