= Shimsky District =

Shimsky District Шимский район (Russian)
- District
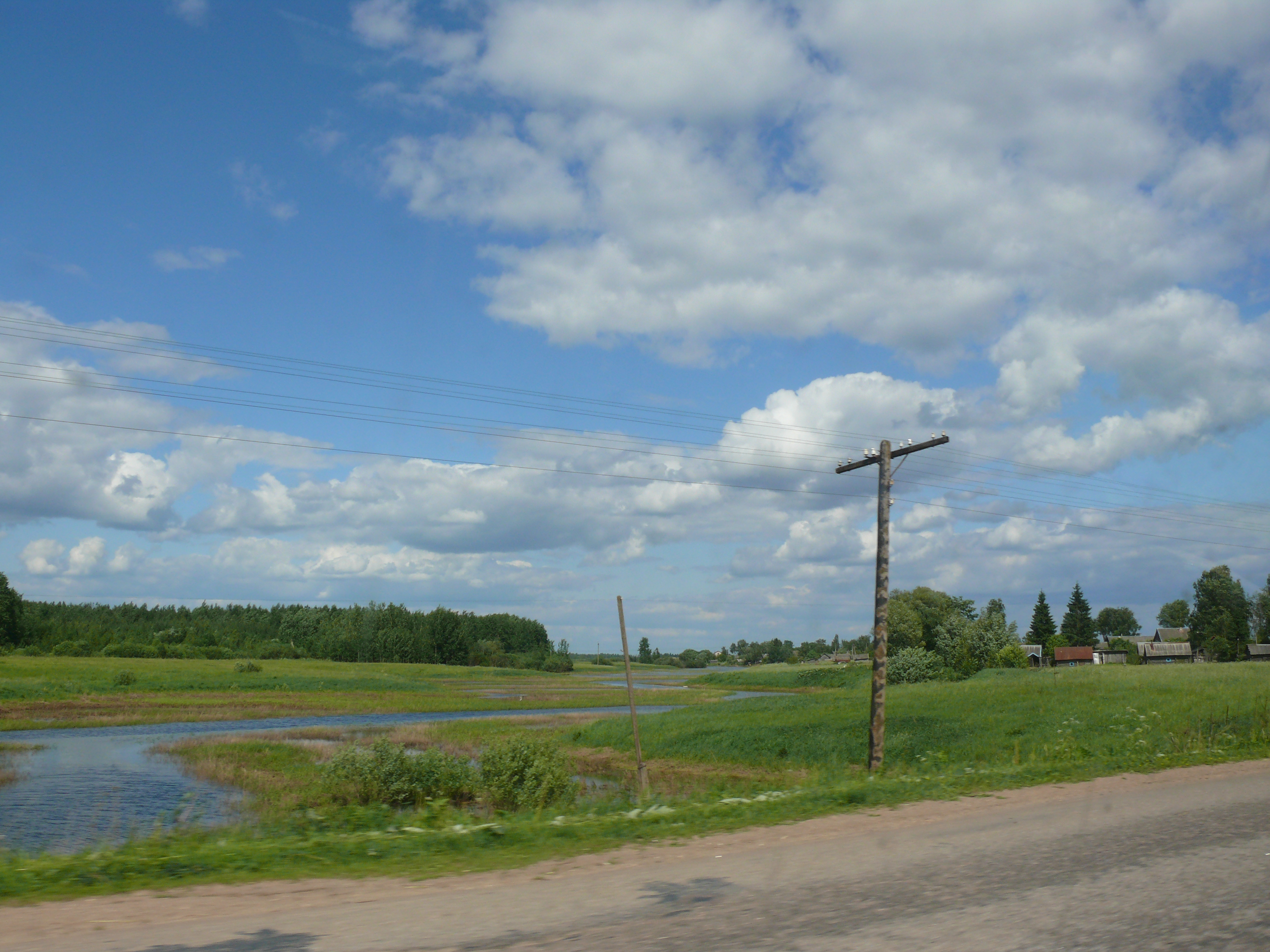
- The Vekhsa River and the village of Uspolon in Shimsky District

- Coat of arms
- Location of Shimsky District in Novgorod Oblast
- Coordinates: 57°12′N 30°43′E
- Country: Russia
- Federal subject: Novgorod Oblast
- Established: February 15, 1935
- Administrative center: Shimsk

Area
  - Total: 1,836 km^{2} (709 sq mi)

Population (2010 Census)
  - Total: 11,750
  - Density: 6.400/km^{2} (16.58/sq mi)
  - Urban: 33.1%
  - Rural: 66.9%

Administrative structure
  - Administrative divisions: 1 Urban-type settlements, 3 Settlements
  - Inhabited localities: 1 urban-type settlements, 126 rural localities

Municipal structure
  - Municipally incorporated as: Shimsky Municipal District
  - Municipal divisions: 1 urban settlements, 3 rural settlements
- Time zone: UTC+3 (MSK)
- OKTMO ID: 49655000
- Website: http://shimsk-nov.ru/

Shimsky District (Russian: Ши́мский райо́н) is an administrative and municipal district (raion), one of the twenty-one in Novgorod Oblast, Russia. It is located in the west of the oblast and borders with Batetsky District in the north, Novgorodsky District in the northeast, Starorussky District in the southeast, Volotovsky District in the south, Soletsky District in the southwest, Strugo-Krasnensky and Plyussky Districts, both of Pskov Oblast, in the west, and with Luzhsky District of Leningrad Oblast in the northwest. The area of the district is 1,836 square kilometers (709 sq mi). Its administrative center is the urban locality (a work settlement) of Shimsk. Population: 11,750 (2010 census); 13,312 (2002 Census); 13,477 (1989 Soviet census). The population of Shimsk accounts for 33.1% of the district's total population.

== Geography ==
The district is located west of Lake Ilmen, and a section of the western shore of the lake belongs to the district. The principal river within the limits of the district is the Shelon, which crosses the southern part of the district and forms an estuary. Shimsk is located on the left bank of the Shelon. Almost the whole area of the district lies in the basin of the Shelon. The biggest (left) tributary of the Shelon within the district is the Mshaga. Minor areas in the north of the district belong to the basin of the Luga River.

== History ==
In the Middle Ages, the Shelon River played an important role as a part of the trade route connecting Novgorod with Pskov and further with the Narva River. At the end of the 15th century, the area was annexed, together with Novgorod, by the Grand Duchy of Moscow, where it was a part of Shelonskaya pyatina of Novgorod. In the course of the administrative reform carried out in 1708 by Peter the Great, it was included in Ingermanland Governorate (known since 1710 as Saint Petersburg Governorate). In 1727, the separate Novgorod Governorate was split off. At the beginning of the 20th century, Shimsk, then known as Shimsky Perevoz, was the seat of Shimskaya Volost of Novgorodsky Uyezd of Novgorod Governorate.

In August 1927, the governorates and uyezds were abolished. The territory of the modern Shimsky District was at the time divided between the newly established Medvedsky (with the administrative center in the selo of Medved), Novgorodsky, Soletsky, and Starorussky Districts. Those districts were a part of Novgorod Okrug of Leningrad Oblast. On July 23, 1930, the okrugs were abolished, and the districts were directly subordinated to the oblast. On February 15, 1935, Shimsky District, with the administrative center in the selo of Shimsk, was established. It included parts of Novgorodsky, Soletsky, and Starorussky Districts. Between August 1941 and February 1944, Shimsky District was occupied by German troops. On July 5, 1944, Shimsky District was transferred to the newly established Novgorod Oblast. In the course of the abortive administrative reform by Nikita Khrushchev, Shimsky District was abolished on February 1, 1963, with its territory split between Soletsky and Starorussky Rural Districts. Subsequently, the area was divided between Novgorodsky, Soletsky, and Starorussky Districts. On February 1, 1973, Shimsky District was re-established. On February 5, 1981, Shimsk was granted urban-type settlement status.

Another district established effective October 1, 1927 was Utorgoshsky District, which was a part of Luga Okrug of Leningrad Oblast and had its administrative center in the railway station of Utorgosh. It included parts of the former Luzhsky Uyezd of Petrograd Governorate. On September 20, 1931, Utorgoshsky District was abolished and merged into Soletsky District. On February 15, 1935, it was re-established, and on July 5, 1944 transferred to newly established Novgorod Oblast. On December 10, 1962, the district was abolished and merged into Soletsky Rural District. After a number of administrative transformations, its territory ended up divided between Soletsky and Shimsky Districts.

== Economy ==
=== Industry ===
Industry in Shimsky District includes food industry and flax textile production. In 2010, the flax factory, located in Utorgosh, was in crisis and had difficulties selling its production.

=== Agriculture ===
The main agricultural specializations in the district are the production of meat, milk, and eggs.

=== Transportation ===
Shimsk is located on the A116 highway which connects Veliky Novgorod and Porkhov (and continues to Pskov under a different code). It is also connected by roads with Luga, Staraya Russa, and Volot. There are local roads as well.

The Shelon is navigable within the district; however, there is no passenger navigation.

== Culture and recreation ==
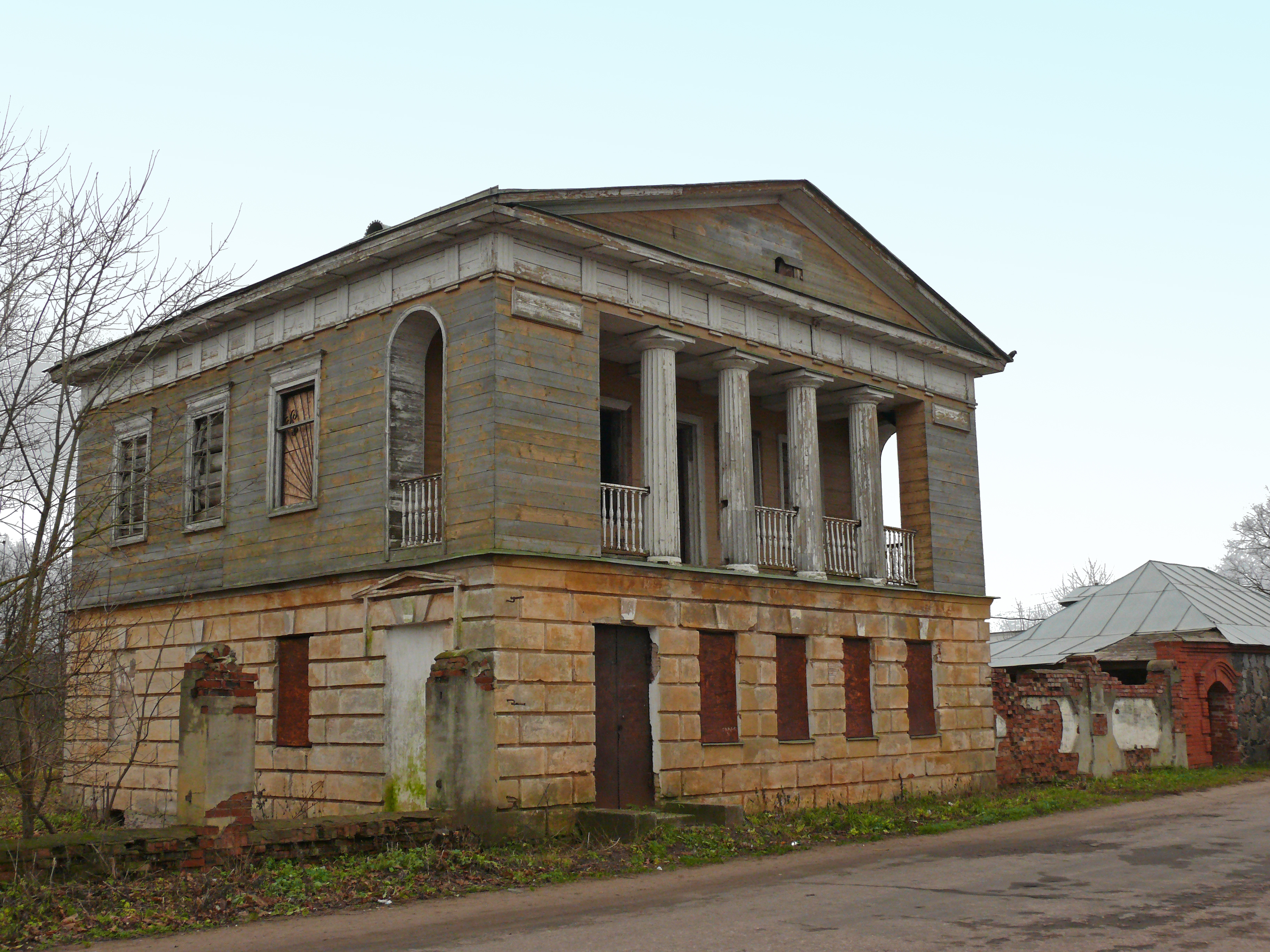
Korostyn Palace

The district contains nine cultural heritage monuments of federal significance and additionally ninety-nine objects (one of them in Shimsk) classified as cultural and historical heritage of local significance. The federal monuments are the complex of the palace in the village of Korostyn built by architect Vasily Stasov, the Assumption Church, also in Korostyn, and an archeological site.

== Notable residents ==
- Theofan of Poltava (1875–1940), archbishop, born Vassili Bystrov in Podmoshie
