= Starorussky =

Starorussky (masculine), Starorusskaya (feminine), or Starorusskoye (neuter) may refer to:

- Starorussky District, a district of Novgorod Oblast, Russia
- Starorussky (rural locality) (Starorusskaya, Starorusskoye), name of several rural localities in Russia
