= Volotovsky District =

Volotovsky District Волотовский район (Russian)
- District
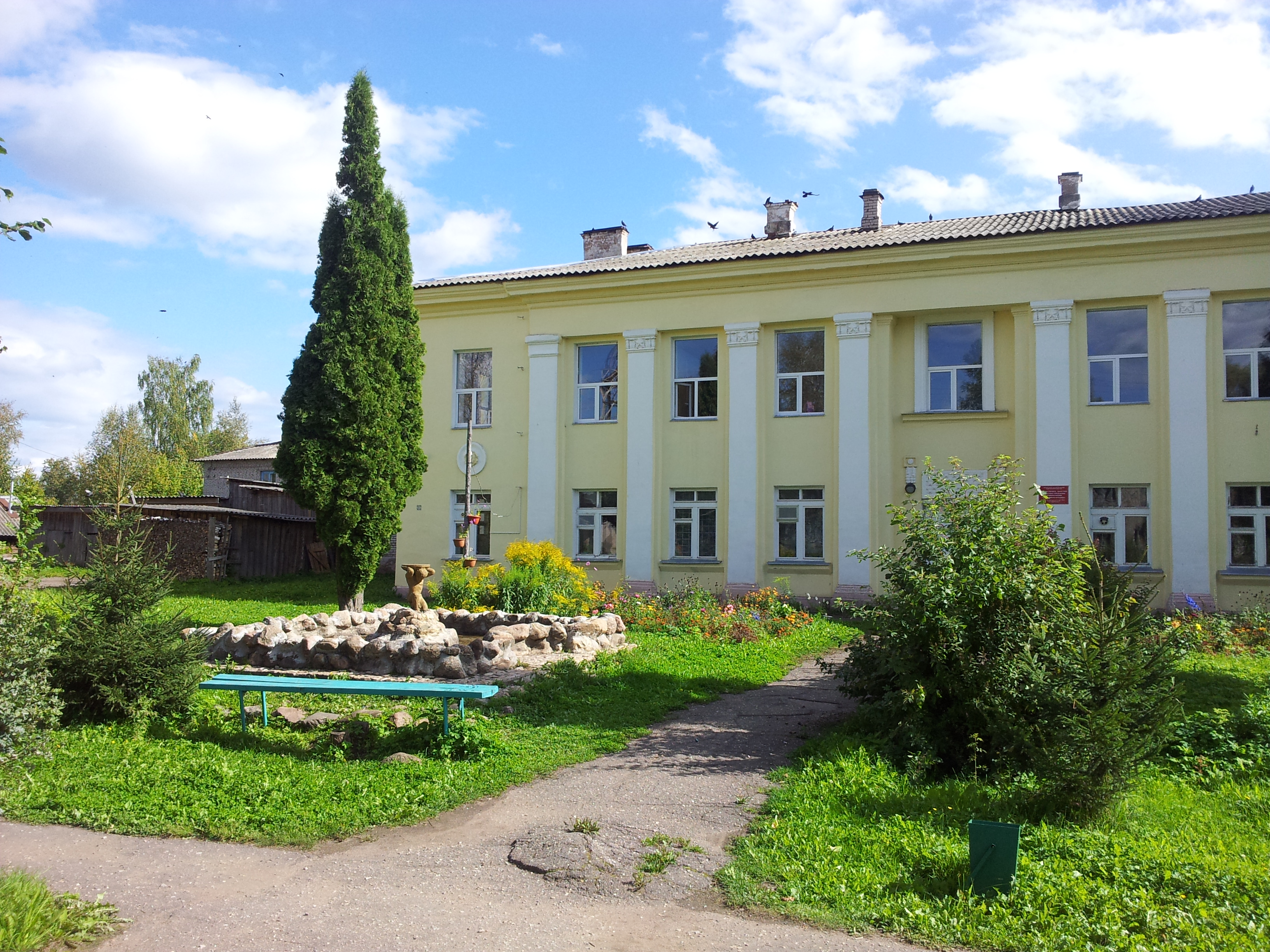
- Hospital in Volot, Volotovsky District

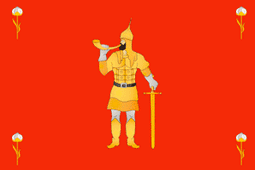
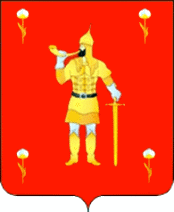
- Flag Coat of arms
- Location of Volotovsky District in Novgorod Oblast
- Coordinates: 57°56′N 30°42′E
- Country: Russia
- Federal subject: Novgorod Oblast
- Established: October 1, 1927 (first), November 3, 1965 (second)
- Administrative center: Volot

Area
  - Total: 995 km^{2} (384 sq mi)

Population (2010 Census)
  - Total: 5,493
  - Density: 5.52/km^{2} (14.3/sq mi)
  - Urban: 0%
  - Rural: 100%

Administrative structure
  - Administrative divisions: 3 settlement
  - Inhabited localities: 110 rural localities

Municipal structure
  - Municipally incorporated as: Volotovsky Municipal District
  - Municipal divisions: 0 urban settlements, 3 rural settlements
- Time zone: UTC+3 (MSK)
- OKTMO ID: 49610000
- Website: http://www.admvolot.net/

Volotovsky District (Russian: Волото́вский райо́н) is an administrative and municipal district (raion), one of the twenty-one in Novgorod Oblast, Russia. It is located in the southwest of the oblast and borders with Shimsky District in the north, Starorussky District in the east, Poddorsky District in the south, Dedovichsky District of Pskov Oblast in the southwest, Dnovsky District of Pskov Oblast in the west, and with Soletsky District in the northwest. The area of the district is 995 square kilometers (384 sq mi), which makes it the smallest district in the oblast. Its administrative center is the rural locality (a settlement) of Volot. District's population: 5,493 (2010 census); 6,106 (2002 Census); 7,058 (1989 Soviet census). The population of Volot accounts for 40.7% of the district's total population.

== Geography ==
The district is located at the Ilmen Depression, southwest of Lake Ilmen. It belongs to the basin of Lake Ilmen, with the rivers in the north draining directly into the lake (the biggest such rivers are the Psizha, the Perekhoda, and the Chernets). The rivers in the southeastern part of the district drain into the Polist River, with the Snezha River being its biggest tributary within the district. The northern part of the district lies in the basin of the Shelon River. Lake Dolzhino in the south is the biggest lake in the district and belongs to the basin of the Perekhoda.

The landscape of the district is almost flat with hills separating river valleys. The elevation above sea level ranges between 60 and 103 meters (197 and 338 ft).

Swamps cover up to 25% of the district's territory. Most of the swamps are located in the river valleys, and most of them in the south of the district. About half of the territory is covered by temperate broadleaf and mixed forest.

== History ==
In the 19th century, the area was a part of Starorussky Uyezd of Novgorod Governorate. In August 1927, the governorates and uyezds were abolished. Volotovsky District, with the administrative center in the railway station of Volot, was established within Novgorod Okrug of Leningrad Oblast effective October 1, 1927. It included parts of former Starorussky Uyezd. On July 23, 1930, the okrugs were abolished, and the districts were directly subordinated to the oblast. On January 1, 1932, Volotovsky District was abolished and split between Dedovichsky, Dnovsky, Soletsky, and Starorussky Districts. On February 15, 1935, it was re-established. Between July 28, 1941 and February 24, 1944, Volotovsky District was occupied by German troops. An extended underground resistance organization was active in the district at the time of occupation. On July 5, 1944, Volotovsky District was transferred to newly established Novgorod Oblast. On February 1, 1963, the district was abolished in the course of the Nikita Khrushchev's administrative reform. On November 3, 1965, Volotovsky District was re-established.

== Economy ==
=== Industry ===
The industry of the district is represented by small enterprises, mainly of food industry.

=== Agriculture ===
As of 2012, three large-scale farms and nineteen mid-scale farms were operating in the district. The main agricultural specializations were meat and milk production, as well as crop growing.

=== Transportation ===
A railway which connects Bologoye and Pskov via Staraya Russa crosses the district from east to west. The main station within the district is Volot.

Volot is connected by roads with Staraya Russa and Soltsy. There are also local roads.

== Culture and recreation ==
The district contains fifty-two objects classified as cultural and historical heritage of local significance. Many of those are archaeological sites.
