= Zaluchye =

Zaluchye (Russian: Залучье) is the name of several rural localities in Russia:

- Zaluchye, Novgorod Oblast, a selo in Zaluchskoye Settlement of Starorussky District of Novgorod Oblast
- Zaluchye, Pskov Oblast, a village in Kunyinsky District of Pskov Oblast
- Zaluchye (Sorozhskoye Rural Settlement), Ostashkovsky District, Tver Oblast, a village in Ostashkovsky District, Tver Oblast; municipally, a part of Sorozhskoye Rural Settlement of that district
- Zaluchye (Zaluchyenskoye Rural Settlement), Ostashkovsky District, Tver Oblast, a village in Ostashkovsky District, Tver Oblast; municipally, a part of Zaluchyenskoye Rural Settlement of that district
- Zaluchye, Udomelsky District, Tver Oblast, a village in Udomelsky District, Tver Oblast
- Zaluchye, Vyshnevolotsky District, Tver Oblast, a village in Vyshnevolotsky District, Tver Oblast
