= Shimsk =

Shimsk Шимск
- Work settlement
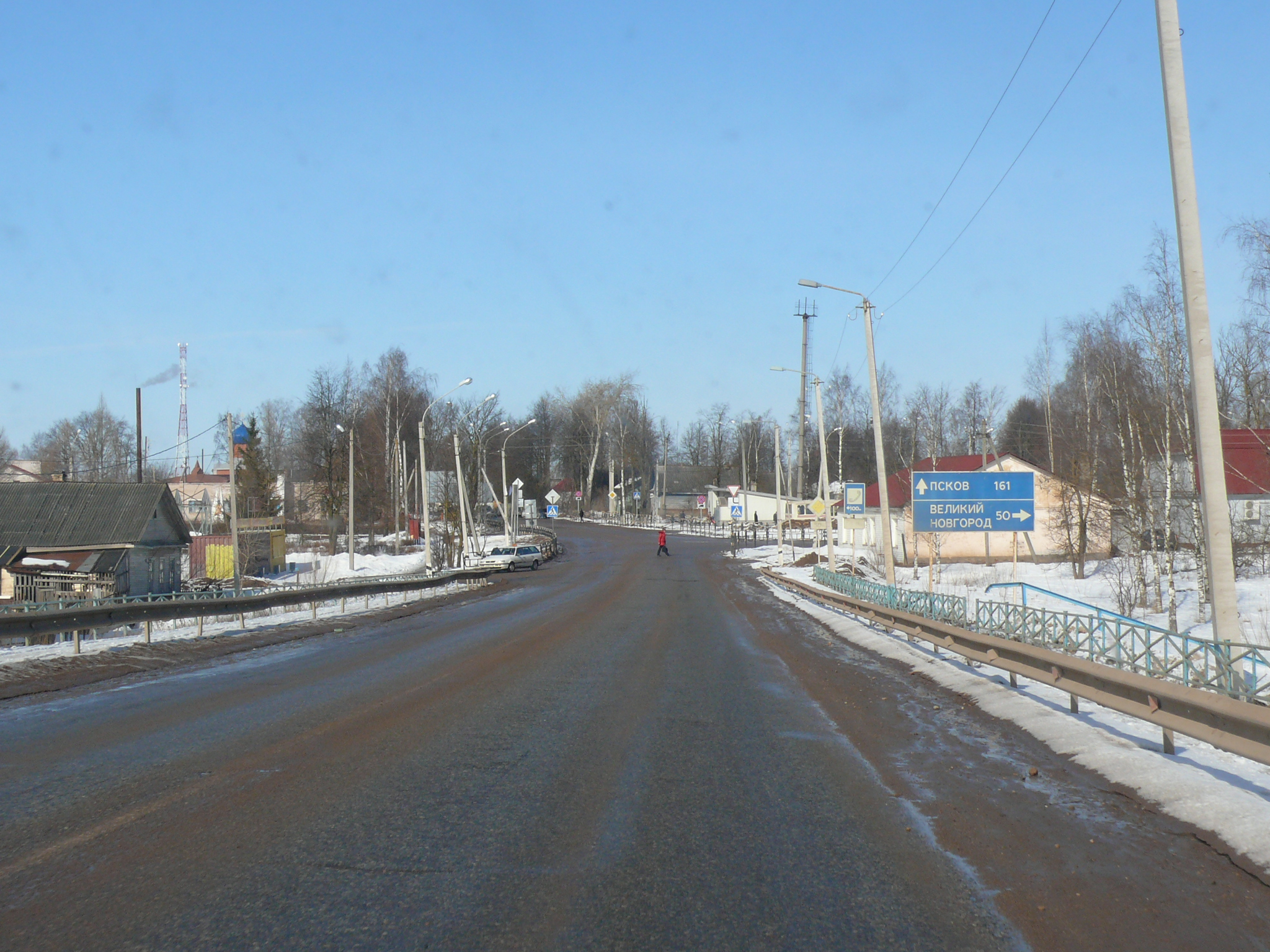
- Panorama from the bridge
- Interactive map of Shimsk
- Location of Shimsk Shimsk (Novgorod Oblast)
- Coordinates: 58°12′40″N 30°43′30″E
- Country: Russia
- Federal subject: Novgorod Oblast
- Administrative district: Shimsky District

Population (2010 Census)
  - Total: 3,895
  - Estimate (2025): 3,356 (−13.8%)

Administrative status
  - Capital of: Shimsky District

Municipal status
  - Municipal district: Shimsky Municipal District
  - Urban settlement: Shimskoye Urban Settlement
  - Capital of: Shimsky Municipal District, Shimskoye Urban Settlement
- Time zone: UTC+3 (MSK)
- Postal code: 174150
- OKTMO ID: 49655151051

Shimsk (Russian: Шимск, IPA: [ʂɨmsk]) is an urban locality (a work settlement) and the administrative center of Shimsky District of Novgorod Oblast, Russia. Municipally, it is incorporated as Shimskoye Urban Settlement, the only urban settlement in the district. It is located on a highway connecting Veliky Novgorod and Pskov, 48 kilometers (30 mi) southwest of Veliky Novgorod. Shimsk lies on Shelon River, approximately 10 kilometers (6.2 mi) upstream from the point where it drains into Lake Ilmen. Population: 3,895 (2010 census); 3,842 (2002 census); 3,992 (1989 Soviet census).

A number of mineral water sources, notably the ones near the village of Uspolon, are located nearby.

== History ==
In the Middle Ages the Shelon River played an important role as part of the trade route connecting Novgorod and Pskov and further with the Narva River. At the end of the 15th century, the area was transferred, together with Novgorod, to the Grand Duchy of Moscow, where it belonged to the Shelon pyatina of Novgorod.

Shimsk was founded in 1878 as a station of the railway connecting Novgorod and Staraya Russa (the railway was destroyed during World War II). In the beginning of the 20th century, Shimsk, then a selo and known as Shimsky Perevoz, was the center of Shimskaya Volost of Novgorodsky Uyezd of Novgorod Governorate.

On February 15, 1935 Shimsky District, with the center in Shimsk, was established. Between 1941 and 1944 Shimsk was occupied by German troops. On July 5, 1944, Shimsky District was transferred to newly established Novgorod Oblast. On February 1, 1963 Shimsky District was abolished, and on February 1, 1973 it was re-established. On February 5, 1981 Shimsk was granted a status of urban-type settlement.

== Economy ==
=== Industry ===
Industry in Shimsk is mainly food industry.

=== Transportation ===
Shimsk is located on the A116 highway which connects Veliky Novgorod and Porkhov (and continues to Pskov under a different code). It is also connected by roads with Luga, Staraya Russa, and Volot. There are local roads as well.

The Shelon is navigable in Shimsk, however, there is no passenger navigation.
