= Volot =

Volot may refer to:

- Volot (rural locality), name of several rural localities in Russia
- Volot, a giant in Slavic mythology
