= Transfiguration Monastery, Staraya Russa =

Coordinates: 57°59′38″N 31°21′37″E

Transfiguration Monastery
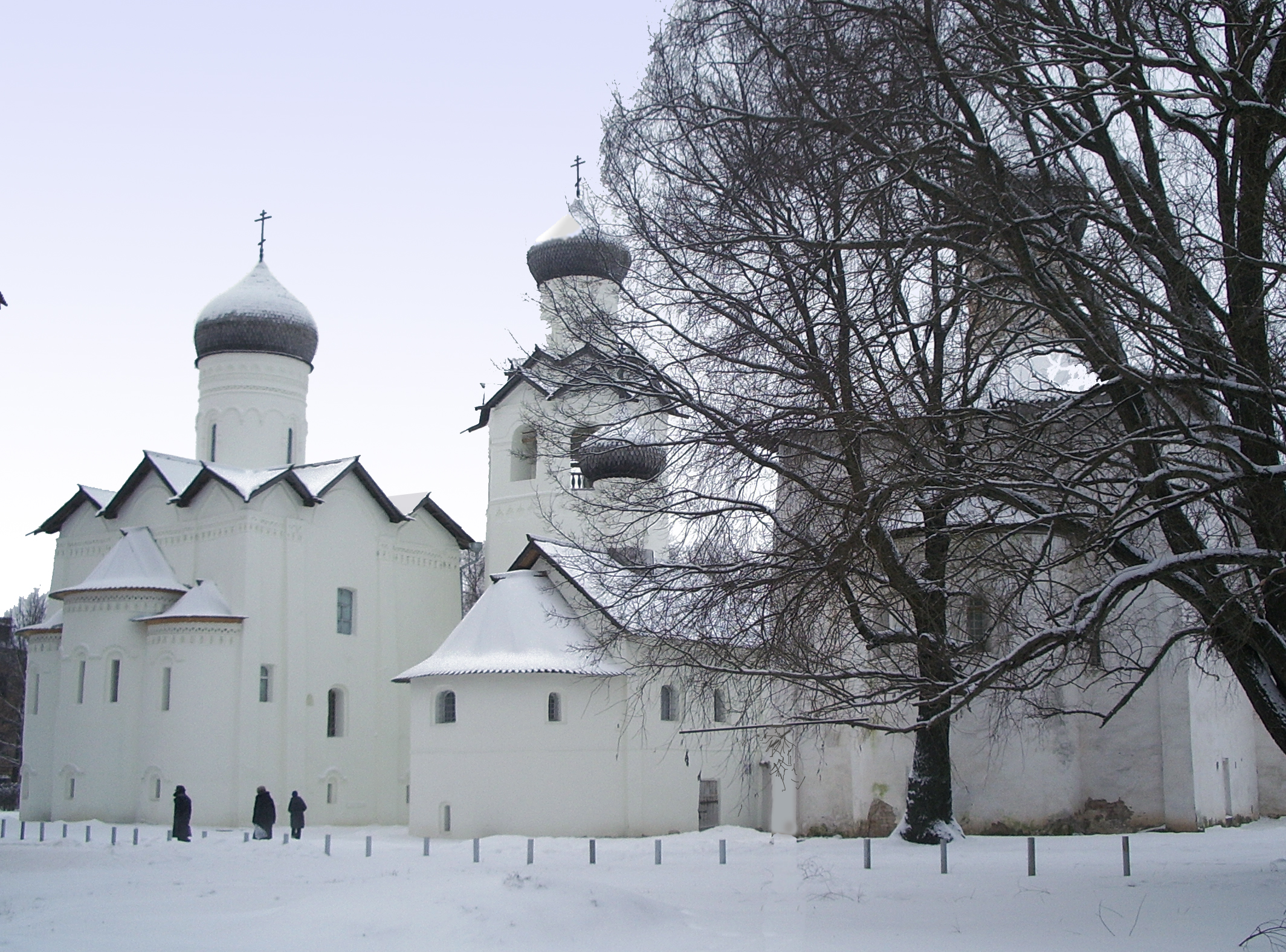
- The panorama of the churches: The Transfiguration Church (left), the Church of the Nativity of Christ (center), and the Presentation Church (right, behind the trees).
- Interactive map of Transfiguration Monastery

Monastery information
- Full name: Спасо-Преображенский монастырь
- Order: Russian Orthodox Church
- Established: 1192
- Diocese: Novgorod

People
- Founder: Martiry Rushanin

Site
- Location: Staraya Russa, Novgorod Oblast, Russia
- Public access: Yes

The Transfiguration Monastery (Russian: Спасо-Преображенский монастырь) is a former Russian Orthodox monastery founded in 1192. The monastery is located in the city of Staraya Russa, on the right bank of the Polist River. It is currently occupied by the Staraya Russa Town Museum.

== History ==
The monastery was founded in 1192 by Martiry Rushanin, who built the wooden Transfiguration Church. At the time, the area belonged to the Novgorod Republic, and the construction of the church was approved by Grigory, the Archbishop of Novgorod. In 1193, Martiry himself was promoted to be the Archbishop of Novgorod and Pskov. Presumably, the wooden church burned down, and in 1198, Martiry founded the stone Transfiguration Church, which still exists. In 1442, the church was considerably rebuilt. Between 1611 and 1615, during the Ingrian War, Staraya Russa, and the monastery in particular, were occupied by Swedish troops. The monastery was badly damaged and rebuilt subsequently in the middle of the 17th century. The Transfiguration Church was considerably altered. Some of the existing churches were constructed in the 17th century. The wall and the towers originate from the 19th century. The monastery was abolished after the 1917 October Revolution, and the buildings were badly damaged during the World War II. Most of the cell buildings were subsequently demolished.

== Architecture ==
The oldest building of the monastery is the Transfiguration Cathedral, which was founded in 1198 by Martiry and completely rebuilt in 1442, so that only the lowest parts of the walls survive from the 12th century. In the 1620s, after the Swedish occupation, it was rebuilt again, and the dome was altered, but the main features of the exterior and the interior were preserved. The cathedral was damaged during World War II and underwent extensive restoration in the 1960s. Subsequently, it was transferred to the museum.

The Church of the Nativity of Christ was constructed around 1630. It is a small brickstone church with one dome. In 1892, it was re-consecrated and became the church of Saints Cyril and Methodius. It was also damaged in the war and restored in the 1960s. The Presentation Church, which currently hosts the art division of the museum, was built in the same period and also has one dome.

The two chapels, the Alexander Nevsky Chapel and the Saviour Chapel, as well as the Church of the Staraya Russa Icon of the Virgin, were built in the 19th century.
