= Volot (rural locality) =

Volot (Russian: Волот) is the name of several rural localities in Volotovsky District of Novgorod Oblast, Russia:

- Volot, Gorskoye Settlement, Volotovsky District, Novgorod Oblast, a village in Gorskoye Settlement
- Volot, Volot Settlement, Volotovsky District, Novgorod Oblast, a settlement of rural type in Volot Settlement
