= Polist =

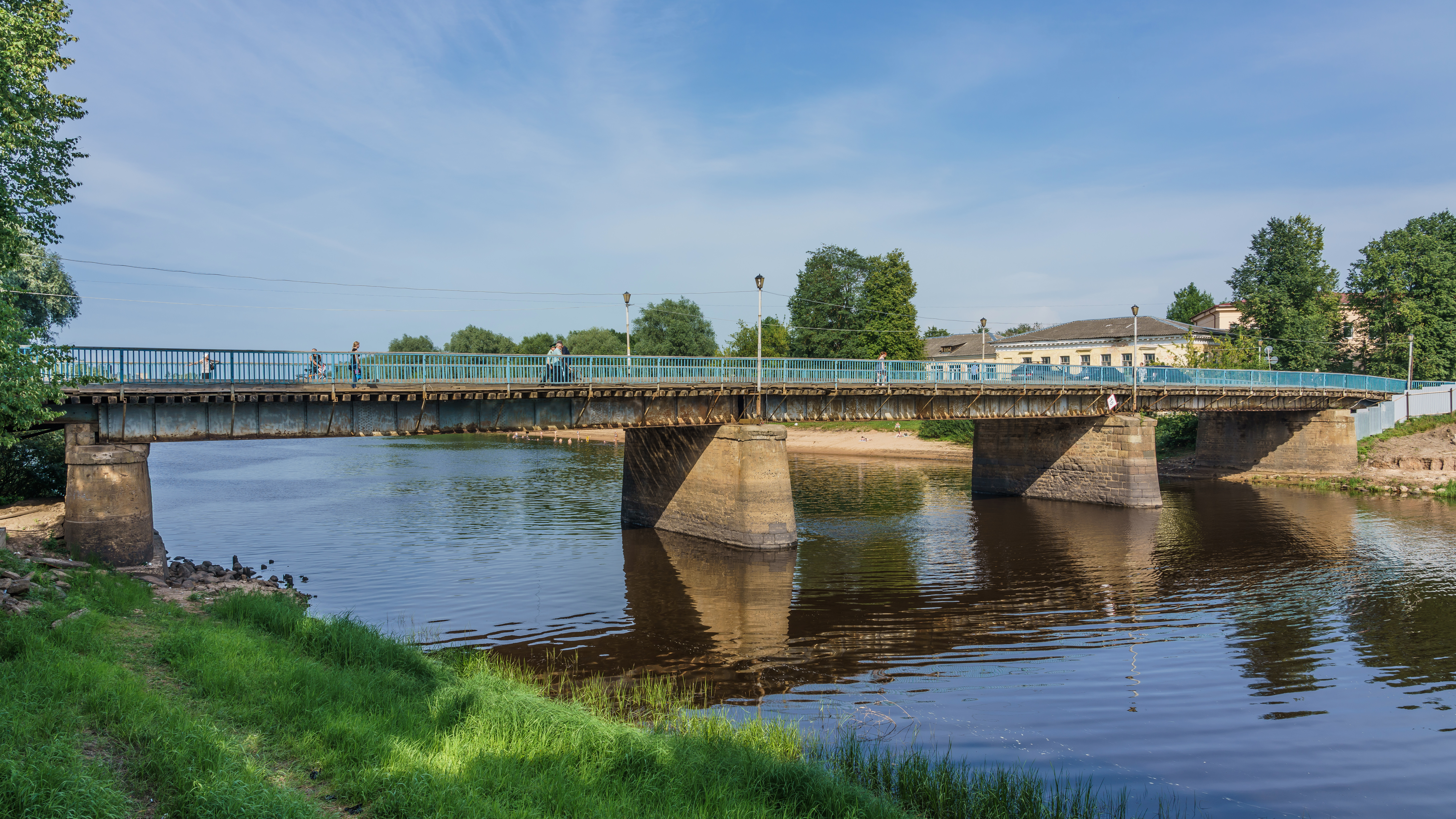
- The Polist River in Staraya Russa

Location
- Country: Russia

Physical characteristics
- Source
  - location: Lake Polisto
  - elevation: 91 metres (299 ft)
- Mouth: Lovat
  - coordinates: 58°06′28″N 31°31′14″E
- Length: 176 km (109 mi)
- Basin size: 3,630 km^{2} (1,400 sq mi)
- Discharge
  - average: 22 cubic metres per second (780 cu ft/s)

Basin features
- Progression: Lovat→ Lake Ilmen→ Volkhov→ Lake Ladoga→ Neva→ Gulf of Finland

The Polist (Russian: река́ По́листь) is a river in Bezhanitsky District of Pskov Oblast and in Poddorsky and Starorussky Districts, as well as in the town of Staraya Russa of Novgorod Oblast of Russia. It is technically a tributary of the Lovat though it forms a common river delta with the Lovat and the Pola at the mouth of the Lovat in Lake Ilmen. It is 176 kilometres (109 mi) long, and the area of its basin 3,630 square kilometres (1,400 sq mi). The principal tributaries of the Polist are the Kholynya (left) and the Porusya (left). The town of Staraya Russa is located on the banks of the Polist.

The source of the Polist is in Lake Polisto in the east of Pskov Oblast, in the western part of the Valdai Hills. The upper course of the Polist is located in the Polist-Lovat Swamp System, one of the biggest raised bog areas in Europe. The Polist flows northeast, enters Novgorod Oblast, and joins the Lovat at its delta.

The river basin of the Polist comprises the eastern part of Bezhanitsky District, the northwestern halves of Poddorsky and Starorussky Districts, as well as minor areas in the east of Volotovsky District. The major part of Polistovsky Nature Reserve lies in the river basin of the Polist.

The Polist is navigable downstream of Staraya Russa, there is however no regular passenger navigation.

Until the 1980s the Polist was used for timber rafting.
