= Soltsy =

Town in Novgorod Oblast, Russia

Soltsy Сольцы
- Town
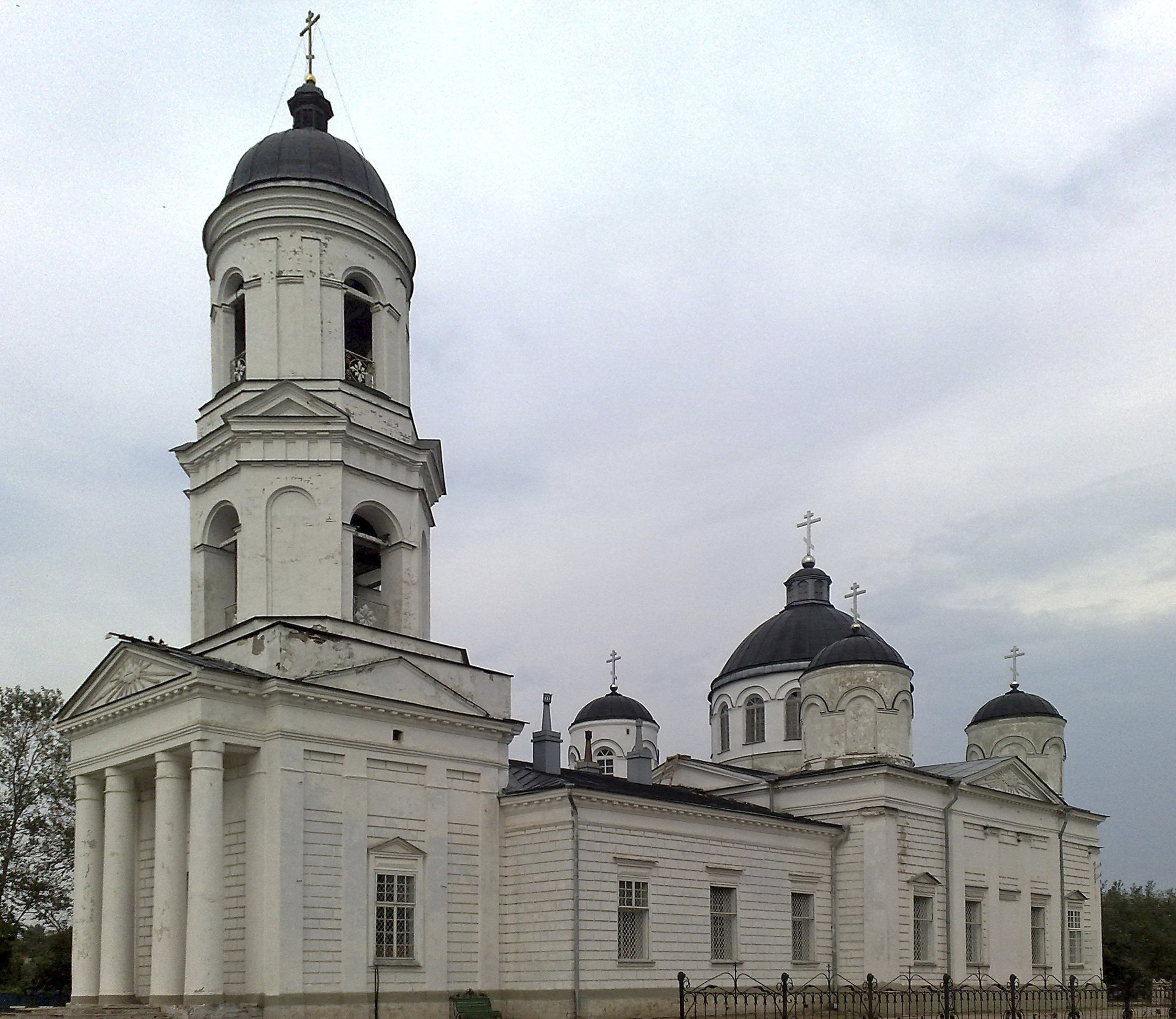
- St. Ilya Cathedral

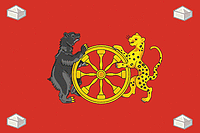
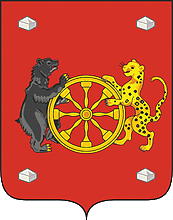
- Flag Coat of arms
- Interactive map of Soltsy
- Location of Soltsy Soltsy (Novgorod Oblast)
- Coordinates: 58°08′N 30°19′E
- Country: Russia
- Federal subject: Novgorod Oblast
- Administrative district: Soletsky District
- Town of district significanceSelsoviet: Soltsy
- First mentioned: 1390
- Town status since: 1927
- Elevation: 30 m (98 ft)

Population (2010 Census)
  - Total: 10,086
  - Estimate (2021): 8,449 (−16.2%)

Administrative status
  - Capital of: Soletsky District, town of district significance of Soltsy

Municipal status
  - Municipal district: Soletsky Municipal District
  - Urban settlement: Soletskoye Urban Settlement
  - Capital of: Soletsky Municipal District, Soletskoye Urban Settlement
- Time zone: UTC+3 (MSK)
- Postal code: 175040–175042
- Dialing code: +7 81655
- OKTMO ID: 49638101001

Soltsy (Russian: Сольцы́) is a town and the administrative center of Soletsky District in Novgorod Oblast, Russia, located on the left bank of the Shelon River, 78 kilometers (48 mi) southwest of Veliky Novgorod, the administrative center of the oblast. Population: 10,086 (2010 census); 11,264 (2002 census); 11,782 (1989 Soviet census).

== History ==
Soltsy, whose name owes to the nearby salt water springs, was first mentioned in a chronicle in 1390 and in the following played an important role as an intermediate station on the trade route connecting Novgorod and Pskov. In 1471, the Battle of Shelon between Muscovite forces led by Ivan III and the army of the Novgorod Republic took place near Soltsy, which marked the end of political independence of the Novgorod Republic. Soltsy eventually became a part of the Moscow State.

In the course of the administrative reform carried out in 1708 by Peter the Great, the territory was included into Ingermanland Governorate (known since 1710 as Saint Petersburg Governorate). In 1727, separate Novgorod Governorate was split off, and in 1772, Pskov Governorate was established (existing between 1777 and 1796 as Pskov Viceroyalty). In 1776, Porkhovsky Uyezd was transferred from Novgorod Governorate to Pskov Governorate. Soltsy was the seat of Soletskaya Volost of Porkhovsky Uyezd.

In August 1927, the uyezds were abolished and, effective October 1, 1927, Soletsky District was established, with the administrative center in Soltsy. Pskov Governorate was abolished as well and the district became a part of Novgorod Okrug of Leningrad Oblast. At the same time, Soltsy was granted town status. On July 23, 1930, the okrugs were abolished and the districts were directly subordinated to the oblast. Between July 13 to 16, 1941 and again from July 22, 1941, to February 21, 1944, Soltsy was occupied by German troops. On July 5, 1944, Soltsy, together with Soletsky District, was transferred to newly established Novgorod Oblast.

== Administrative and municipal status ==
Within the framework of administrative divisions, Soltsy serves as the administrative center of Soletsky District. As an administrative division, it is, together with two rural localities, incorporated within Soletsky District as the town of district significance of Soltsy. As a municipal division, the town of district significance of Soltsy is incorporated within Soletsky Municipal District as Soletskoye Urban Settlement.

== Economy ==
=== Industry ===
The main branches of industry in Soltsy are electronic industry and food industry.

=== Transportation ===
The railway connecting St. Petersburg and Nevel via Dno crosses the district from north to south, running close to Soltsy. The railway connecting Bologoye and Pskov via Staraya Russa crosses the southern tip of the district; however, there are no significant stations on this line within the district's territory.

The town is located along the Veliky Novgorod–Pskov highway and is also connected by road to Staraya Russa via Volot.

The Shelon River is navigable downstream of Soltsy; however, there is no passenger navigation.

== Culture ==
Soltsy contains one cultural heritage monument of federal significance and additionally fifty-one objects classified as cultural and historical heritage of local significance. The federal monument is the St. Ilya Cathedral.

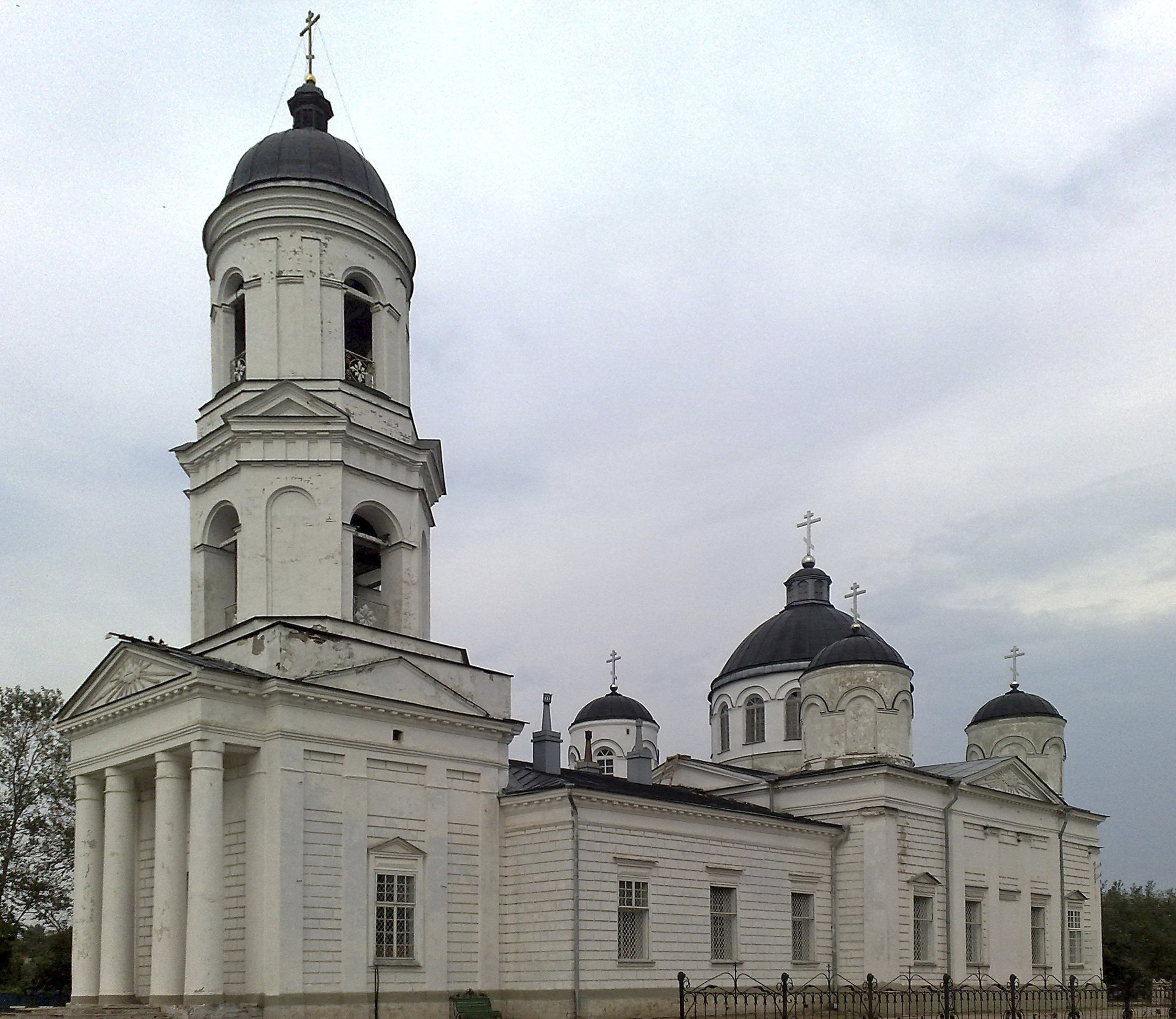
St. Ilya Cathedral

St. Ilya Cathedral inside

Soletsky District Museum is located in Soltsy. It exhibits collections of local interest.

== Military ==
A key strategic military base, Soltsy-2 is located northeast of the town.
