= Shelon =

Shelon River
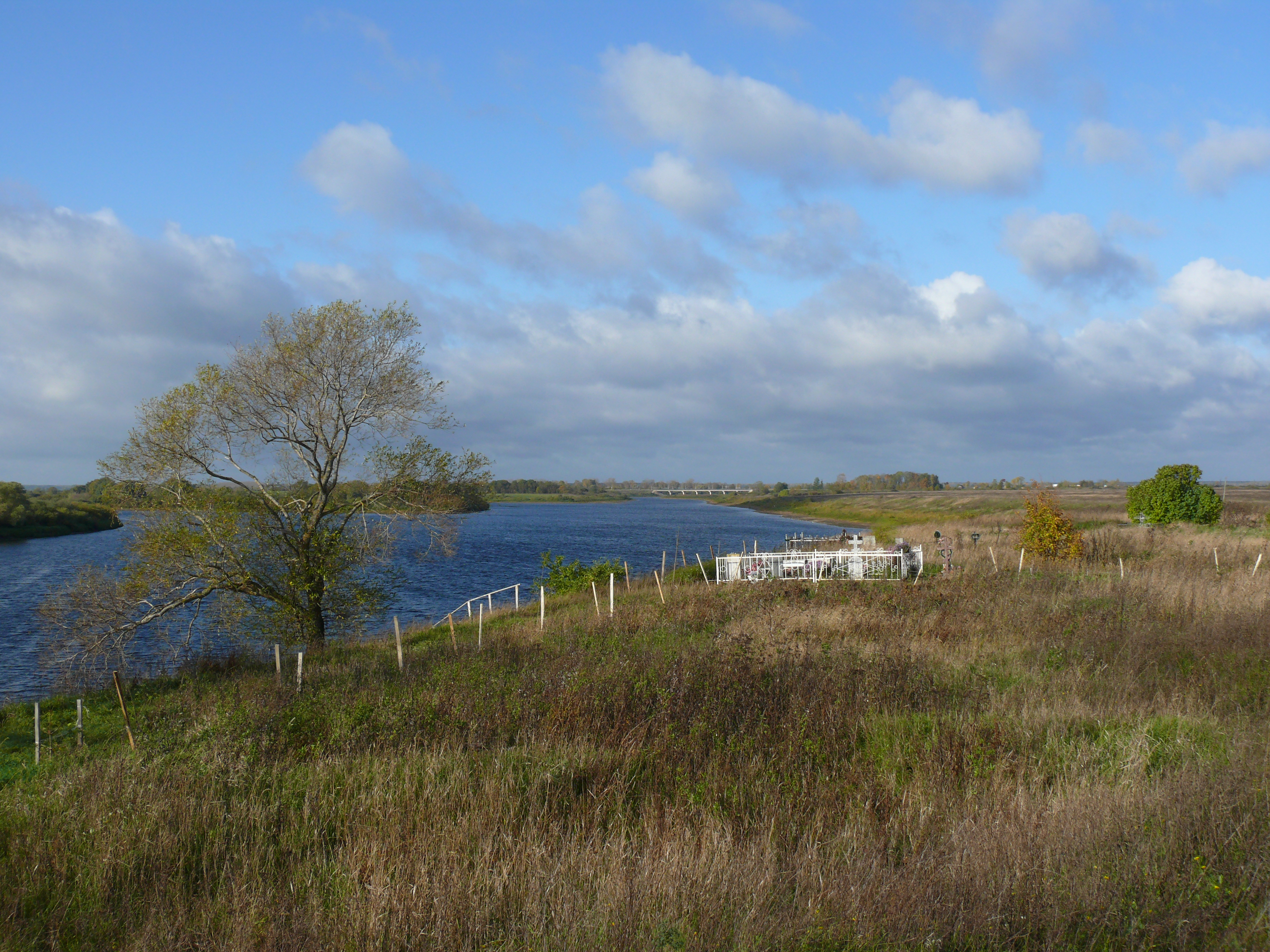
- The Shelon in the village of Bor

Location
- Country: Russia

Physical characteristics
- Mouth: Lake Ilmen
  - coordinates: 58.21449°N 30.78266°E
- Length: 248 km (154 mi)
- Basin size: 9,710 km^{2} (3,750 sq mi)
- Discharge
  - average: 43.6 cubic metres per second (1,540 cu ft/s)

Basin features
- Progression: Lake Ilmen→ Volkhov→ Lake Ladoga→ Neva→ Gulf of Finland

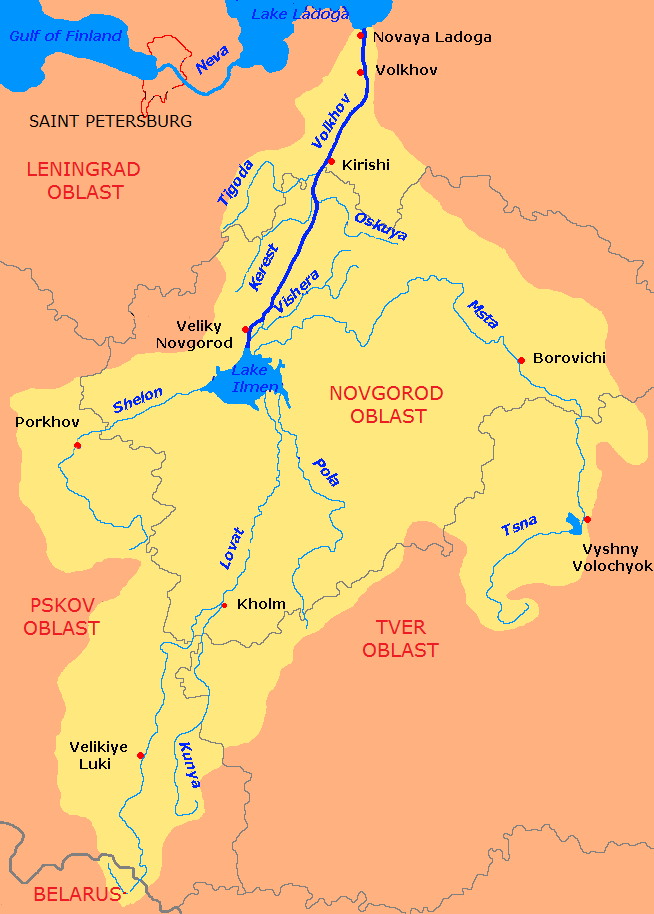
The Volkhov River drainage basin. The Shelon is shown on the map.

The Shelon (Russian: Шелонь) is a river in the northwest part of European Russia, in Dedovichsky, Porkhovsky, and Dnovsky Districts of Pskov Oblast and Soletsky and Shimsky Districts of Novgorod Oblast. The Shelon is one of the principal tributaries of Lake Ilmen. It has a length of 248 kilometres (154 mi) and drains a basin of 9,710 square kilometres (3,750 mi^{2}). The towns of Porkhov and Soltsy, as well as urban-type settlements of Dedovichi and Shimsk, are located on the banks of the Shelon. The principal tributaries of the Shelon are the Sudoma (left), the Belka (right), the Polonka (right), the Uza (left), the Udokha (left), the Sitnya (left), and the Mshaga (left).

The Shelon has its source in the swamps at the east of Pskov Oblast, close to the border with Novgorod Oblast. It flows northeast, then turns around and flows west. Around the urban-type settlement of Dedovichi the Shelon turns northwest. It further enters Porkhovsky District, and behind Porkhov turns north and then northeast. The Shelon crosses a short segment of Dnovsky District and returns to Porkhovsky District, crossing then to Novgorod Oblast. In Novgorod Oblast, the Shelon flows northeast and has its mouth by the urban-type settlement of Shimsk, forming an estuary.

The river basin of the Shelon comprises vast areas on the Ilmen Depression which administratively are located in Soletsky, Shimsky, and Volotovsky Districts of Novgorod Oblast, and in Porkhovsky, Dnovsky, Dedovichsky, and Bezhanitsky Districts of Pskov Oblast.

The Shelon is navigable downstream of the town of Soltsy, however, there is no passenger navigation.

== History ==
The Battle of Shelon on July 14, 1471 between Muscovy and Novgorod Republic occurred between the town of Soltsy and the mouth of the Shelon. It ended in a victory for the Muscovite army led by Prince Kholmsky, and consequently resulted in the annexation of Novgorod by Muscovy in 1478.
