= Starorussky District =

Starorussky District Старорусский район (Russian)
- District
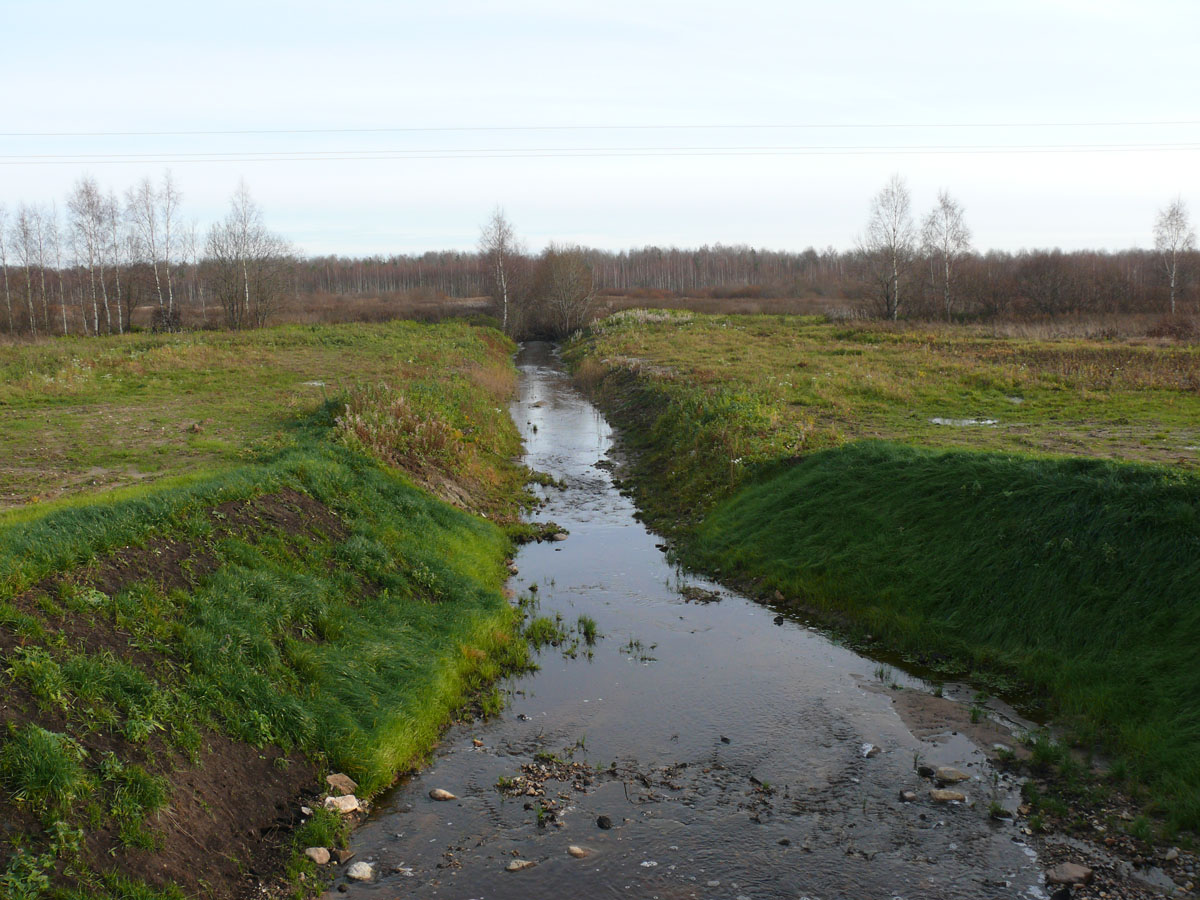
- The Kamenka River in Starorussky District, a tributary of the Porusya

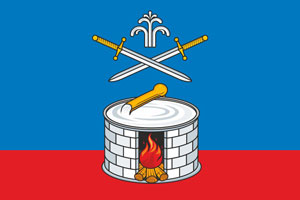
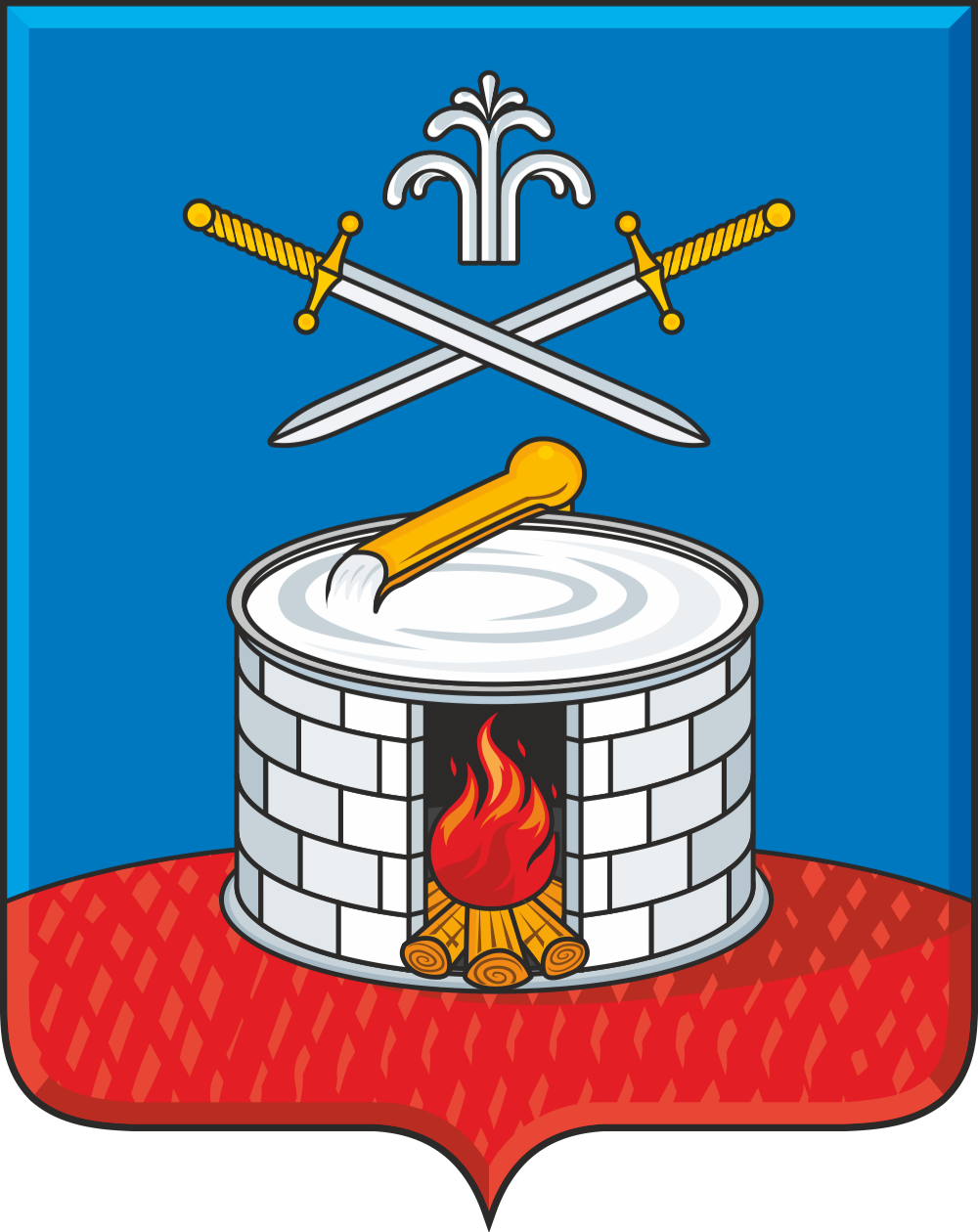
- Flag Coat of arms
- Location of Starorussky District in Novgorod Oblast
- Coordinates: 58°16′N 34°07′E
- Country: Russia
- Federal subject: Novgorod Oblast
- Established: October 1, 1927
- Administrative center: Staraya Russa

Area
  - Total: 3,111 km^{2} (1,201 sq mi)

Population (2010 Census)
  - Total: 15,063
  - Density: 4.842/km^{2} (12.54/sq mi)
  - Urban: 0%
  - Rural: 100%

Administrative structure
  - Administrative divisions: 7 Settlements
  - Inhabited localities: 287 rural localities

Municipal structure
  - Municipally incorporated as: Starorussky Municipal District
  - Municipal divisions: 1 urban settlements, 7 rural settlements
- Time zone: UTC+3 (MSK)
- OKTMO ID: 49639000
- Website: http://www.admrussa.ru/

Starorussky District (Russian: Старору́сский райо́н) is an administrative and municipal district (raion), one of the twenty-one in Novgorod Oblast, Russia. It is located in the southwest of the oblast and borders with Parfinsky District in the east, Demyansky and Maryovsky Districts in the southeast, Poddorsky District in the southwest, Volotovsky District in the west, and with Shimsky District in the northwest. From the north, the district is limited by Lake Ilmen. The area of the district is 3,111 square kilometers (1,201 sq mi). Its administrative center is the town of Staraya Russa (which is not administratively a part of the district). Population: 15,063 (2010 census); 16,214 (2002 Census); 18,505 (1989 Soviet census).

== Geography ==
The whole area of Starorussky District lies in the basin of Lake Ilmen. The two biggest rivers are the Polist with the right tributary the Porusya, and the Lovat, with the left tributary the Redya. The Lovat and the Polist form a joint river delta with the Pola River. The western part of the delta lies within the district. The southern shore of Lake Ilmen is a part of Starorussky District as well.

== History ==
The Lovat River was a part of the trade route from the Varangians to the Greeks, one of the oldest trading routes passing through Rus'. Staraya Russa was first mentioned in the 1167 chronicle as Rusa. The area belonged to the Novgorod Republic. After the fall of Novgorod in 1483, it was annexed by the Grand Duchy of Moscow. Between 1611 and 1615, during the Ingrian War, it was occupied by Swedish troops.

In the course of the administrative reform carried out in 1708 by Peter the Great, the area was included into Ingermanland Governorate (known since 1710 as Saint Petersburg Governorate). In 1727, separate Novgorod Governorate was split off. In 1776, Staraya Russa became the administrative center of Starorussky Uyezd of Novgorod Viceroyalty. In 1796, the viceroyalty was transformed into Novgorod Governorate. In the 1820s, military settlements were organized in Staraya Russa and around, in accordance with the project designed by Aleksey Arakcheyev, an influential statesman. As it was inconvenient to have both civil and military administration in Staraya Russa, the uyezd was subsequently abolished in 1824. The town of Staraya Russa and some adjacent territories were directly subordinated to the Defense Ministry. The military settlements were proven inefficient, in particular, in 1831, the area participated in the Cholera Riots. They were abolished in 1856. In 1857, Starorussky Uyezd was re-established.

In August 1927, the governorates and uyezds were abolished. Starorussky District, with the administrative center in the town of Staraya Russa, was established within Novgorod Okrug of Leningrad Oblast effective October 1, 1927. It included parts of former Starorussky Uyezd. On July 23, 1930, the okrugs were abolished, and the districts were directly subordinated to the oblast. On September 20, 1931, Podgoshchsky District was abolished and merged into Starorussky District. On January 1, 1932, a part of abolished Volotovsky District was merged into Starorussky District; this was reverted on February 15, 1935. On September 19, 1939, Staraya Russa was elevated in status to that of a town under oblast jurisdiction and thus ceased to be a part of the district. Between August 1941 and February 19, 1944, Starorussky District was occupied by German troops. On July 5, 1944, Starorussky District was transferred to newly established Novgorod Oblast, where it remained ever since. On July 22, 1961, a part of abolished Zaluchsky District was merged into Starorussky District. On February 1, 1963, the district was transformed into Starorussky Rural District in the course of the Nikita Khrushchev's abortive administrative reform. This was reverted on January 12, 1965. On December 13, 1968, Parfinsky District was split from Starorussky District. Also, in the mid-1960s, parts of Volotovsky and Polavsky Districts were transferred to Starorussky District and then back. Polavsky District in the end was split between Parfinsky and Demyansky Districts.

=== Abolished districts ===
Effective October 1, 1927, Podgoshchsky District with the administrative center in the selo of Podgoshchi was also established, as a part of Novgorod Okrug of Leningrad Oblast. It included parts of Starorussky Uyezd. On September 20, 1931, Podgoshchsky District was abolished and merged into Starorussky District.

Also effective October 1, 1927, Volotovsky District with the administrative center in the settlement of Volot was established, as a part of Novgorod Okrug of Leningrad Oblast. It included parts of Starorussky Uyezd. On January 1, 1932, Volotovsky District was abolished and split between Soletsky, Starorussky, Dnovsky, and Dedovichsky Districts. On February 15, 1935, the district was re-established.

Another district established effective October 1, 1927 as a part of Novgorod Okrug of Leningrad Oblast was Zaluchsky District, with the administrative center in the selo of Zaluchye. It included parts of Starorussky Uyezd. Between August 1941 and February 1943, Zaluchsky District was occupied by German troops. On July 5, 1944, Zaluchsky District was transferred to newly established Novgorod Oblast. On July 22, 1961, Zaluchsky District was abolished and split between Starorussky and Molvotitsky Districts.

== Administrative and municipal status ==
Within the framework of administrative divisions, Starorussky District is one of the twenty-one in the oblast. The town of Staraya Russa serves as its administrative center, despite being incorporated separately as a town of oblast significance—an administrative unit with the status equal to that of the districts (and which, in addition to Staraya Russa, also includes two rural localities).

As a municipal division, the district is incorporated as Starorussky Municipal District, with the town of oblast significance of Staraya Russa being incorporated within it as Staraya Russa Urban Settlement.

== Economy ==
=== Industry ===
Most industrial enterprises are concentrated in the town of Staraya Russa, which is administratively not a part of the district. In the district proper, there are several timber industry enterprises.

=== Agriculture ===
The district specializes in fishing in Lake Ilmen as well as cattle breeding with subsequent meat and milk production.

=== Transportation ===
A railway which connects Bologoye and Pskov via Staraya Russa runs through the district from east to west.

Staraya Russa is connected by roads with Novgorod, Demyansk, and Bezhanitsy via Kholm. There are also local roads.

Lake Ilmen is navigable; however, there is no passenger navigation.

== Culture and recreation ==
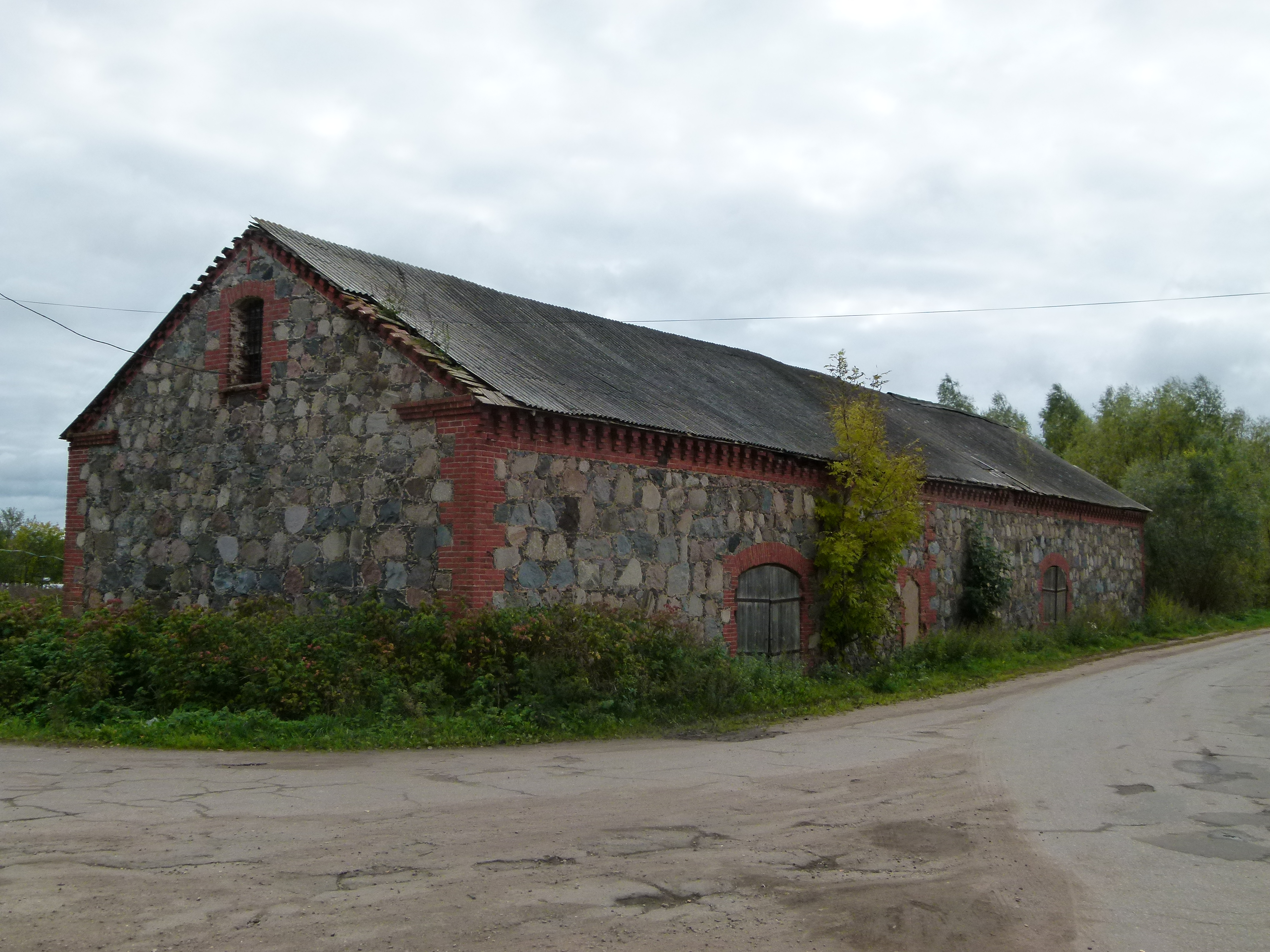
Morozov granary in the village of Borisovo, preserved as a monument of culture

The district contains 8 cultural heritage monuments of federal significance and additionally 130 objects classified as cultural and historical heritage of local significance. The monuments under federal protection include:

- Buregsky Monastery in the village of Buregi
- Saint Nicholas Kosino Monastery in the village of Kosino
- Remains of a fortress on the bank of the Lorinka River

== Notable residents ==
- Anatolijus Baranovas (born 1940 in Buregi), Olympic marathon runner
- Nikolai Tomsky (1900 in Ramushevo – 1984), much-decorated Soviet sculptor
