= Starorussky (rural locality) =

Starorussky (Russian: Старору́сский; masculine), Starorusskaya (Старору́сская; feminine), or Starorusskoye (Старору́сское; neuter) is the name of several rural localities in Russia:

- Starorusskoye, Kaliningrad Oblast, a settlement in Khrabrovsky Rural Okrug of Guryevsky District of Kaliningrad Oblast
- Starorusskoye, Leningrad Oblast, a logging depot settlement in Polyanskoye Settlement Municipal Formation of Vyborgsky District of Leningrad Oblast
- Starorusskoye, Sakhalin Oblast, a selo under the administrative jurisdiction of the city of oblast significance of Yuzhno-Sakhalinsk, Sakhalin Oblast
