= Volot, Volot Settlement, Volotovsky District, Novgorod Oblast =

Volot Волот
- Settlement (of rural type)
- Interactive map of Volot
- Location of Volot Volot (Novgorod Oblast)
- Coordinates: 57°56′N 30°42′E
- Country: Russia
- Federal subject: Novgorod Oblast
- Administrative district: Volotovsky District
- Selsoviet: Volot Settlement
- Elevation: 70 m (230 ft)

Population (2010 Census)
  - Total: 2,236
  - Estimate (2010): 2,236 (0%)

Administrative status
  - Capital of: Volotovsky District, Volot Settlement

Municipal status
  - Municipal district: Volotovsky Municipal District
  - Rural settlement: Volot Rural Settlement
  - Capital of: Volotovsky Municipal District, Volot Rural Settlement
- Time zone: UTC+3 (MSK)
- Postal code: 175100
- OKTMO ID: 49610404101

Volot (Russian: Волот) is a rural locality (a settlement of rural type) and the administrative center of Volotovsky District of Novgorod Oblast, Russia, located in the west of the oblast on the banks of the Psizha River. It also serves as the administrative center of Volot Settlement, one of the three settlements into which the district is administratively divided. Municipally, it is the administrative center of Volot Rural Settlement. Population: 2,236 (2010 census); 2,329 (2002 census); 2,485 (1989 Soviet census).

== History ==
In the 19th century, the village Volot was a part of Starorussky Uyezd of Novgorod Governorate. In 1897, a railroad connecting Bologoye and Pskov was opened, and Volot became one of the sixteen railway stations. Later, the settlement at the railway station became the settlement of Volot. On August 1, 1927, the uyezds were abolished, and Volotovsky District was established, with the center in the railway station of Volot. Novgorod Governorate was abolished as well, and the district belonged to Novgorod Okrug of Leningrad Oblast. On July 23, 1930, the okrugs were abolished, and the districts became directly subordinate to the oblast. On January 1, 1932 Volotovsky District was abolished and split between Dedovichsky, Dnovsky, Soletsky, and Starorussky Districts. On February 15, 1935 it was re-established. Between 1941 and 1944 Volot was occupied by German troops. In the district, an extended underground resistance organization was active. On July 5, 1944, Volot and Volotovsky District were transferred to newly established Novgorod Oblast.

== Economy ==
=== Industry ===
The industry in Volot is represented by small enterprises mainly of food industry.

=== Transportation ===
Volot was founded as a railway station on the railway which connects Bologoye and Pskov via Staraya Russa. The station is still in operation.

Volot is connected by roads with Staraya Russa and Soltsy. There are also local roads.
