= Starorussky Uyezd =

Subdivision of the Novgorod Governorate of the Russian Empire

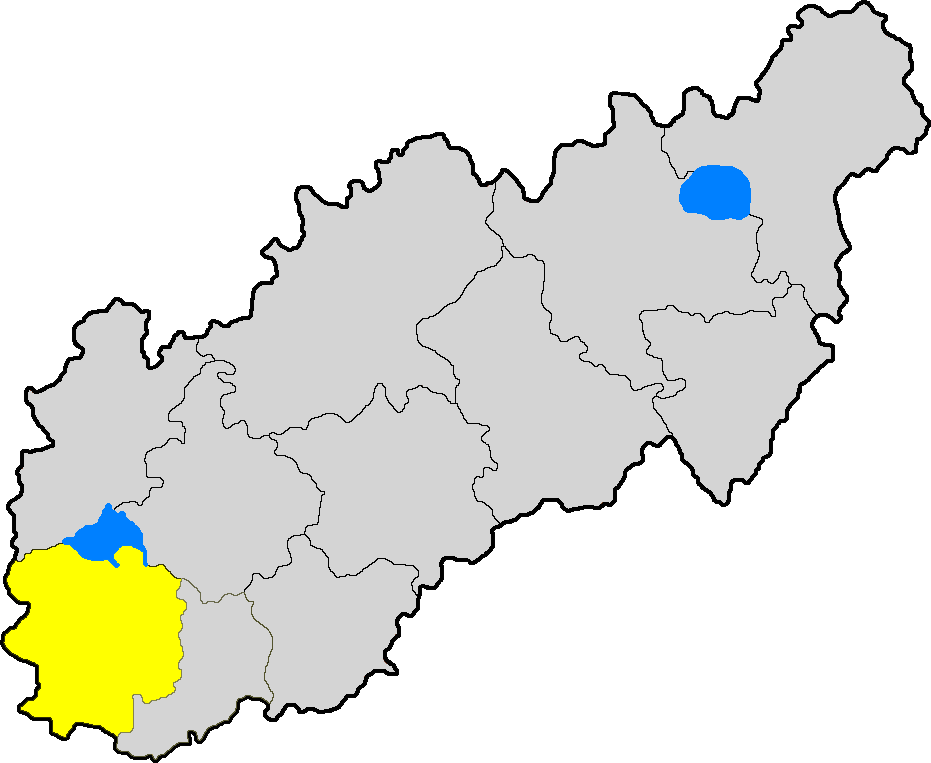

Starorussky Uyezd (Старорусский уезд) was one of the subdivisions of the Novgorod Governorate of the Russian Empire. It was situated in the southwestern part of the governorate. Its administrative centre was Staraya Russa.

== Demographics ==
At the time of the Russian Empire Census of 1897, Starorussky Uyezd had a population of 191,957. Of these, 99.0% spoke Russian, 0.3% Yiddish, 0.3% Polish, 0.2% German, 0.1% Estonian and 0.1% Belarusian as their native language.
