= Lake Ilmen =

Large lake in Novgorod Oblast, Russia

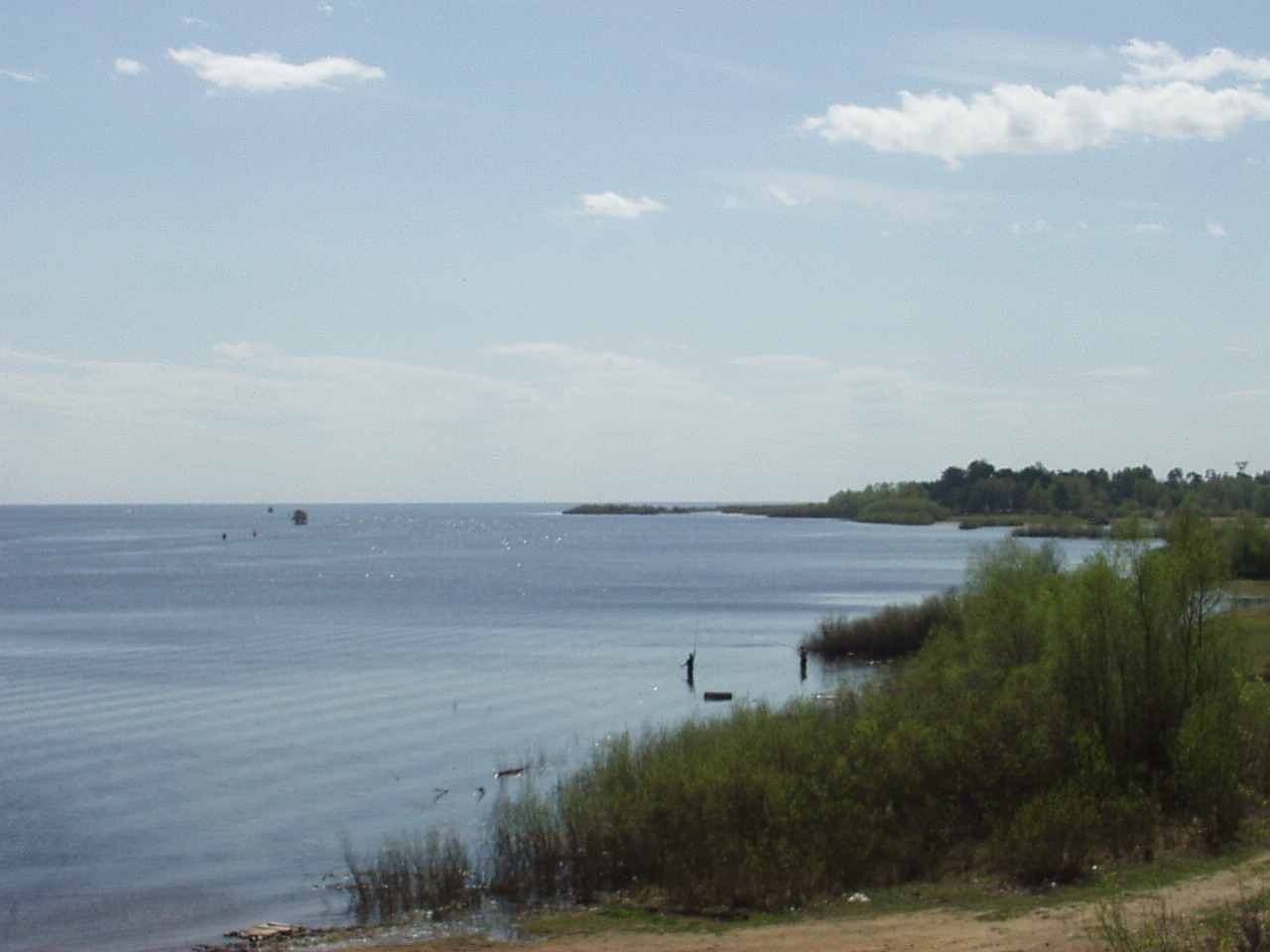

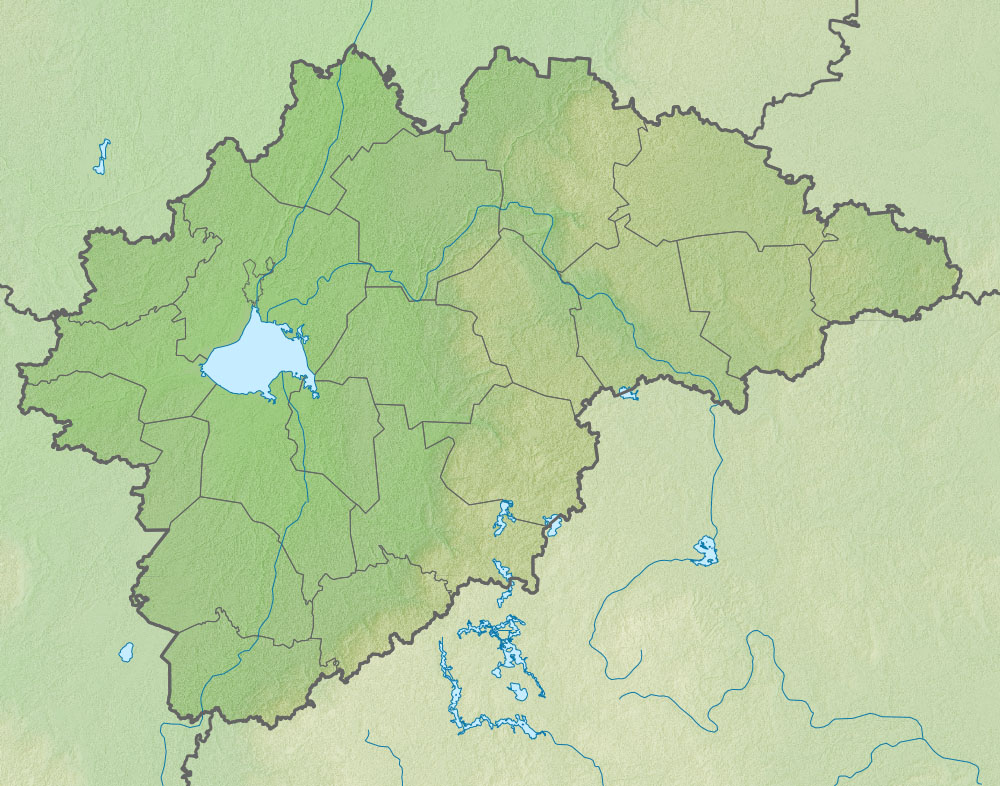
- Location within Novgorod Oblast
- Location: Novgorod Oblast
- Coordinates: 58°16′12″N 31°17′18″E
- Primary inflows: Msta, Lovat, Shelon
- Primary outflows: Volkhov
- Catchment area: 67,200 km^{2} (25,900 sq mi)
- Basin countries: Russia
- Max. length: 40 km (25 mi)
- Max. width: 32 km (20 mi)
- Surface area: 982 km^{2} (379 sq mi)
- Max. depth: 10 m (33 ft)
- Water volume: 12 km^{3} (2.9 cu mi)
- Surface elevation: 18 m (59 ft)

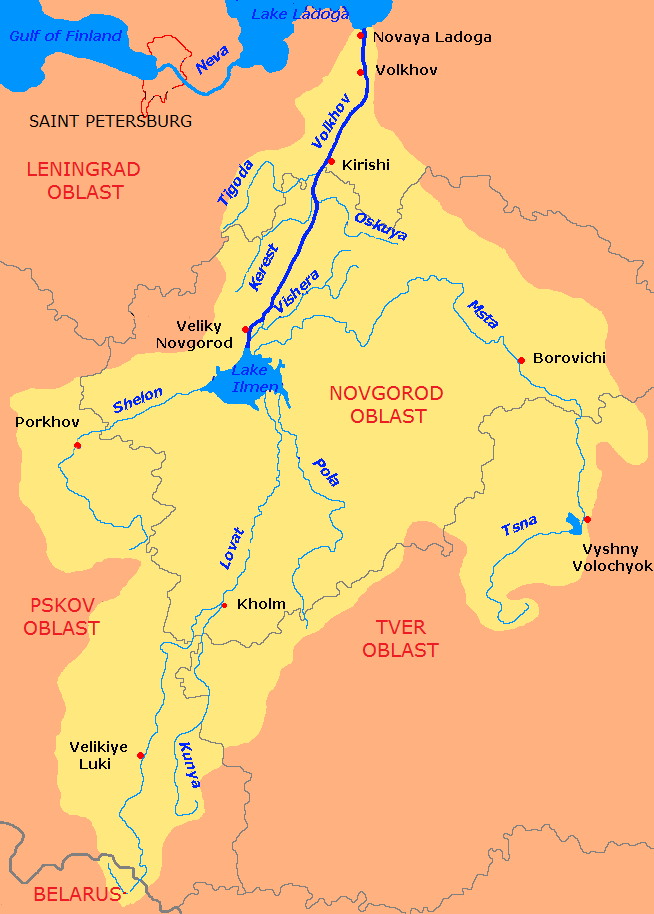
The Volkhov River drainage basin

Lake Ilmen (Russian: И́льмень, IPA: [ˈilʲmʲɪnʲ]) is a large lake in Novgorod Oblast, Russia. A historically important lake, it formed a vital part of the medieval trade route from the Varangians to the Greeks. The city of Veliky Novgorod, which is a major trade center of the route, lies six kilometres (3.7 mi) below the lake's sole outflow, via the Volkhov River.

According to Max Vasmer's Etymological Dictionary, the name of the lake originates from Finnic Ilmajärvi, which means "air lake". Thanks to Novgorodian colonisation, many lakes in Russia have names deriving from Lake Ilmen. Yuri Otkupshchikov has argued that the presence of the name "Ilmen" in Southern Russia cannot be explained by Novgorodian colonisation alone, and proposed a Slavic etymology instead.

The average surface area of the lake is 982 square kilometres (379 mi^{2}) (it may vary between 733 square kilometres (283 mi^{2}) and 2,090 square kilometres (810 mi^{2}) depending on water level). The lake is fed by 52 inflowing rivers, the four main ones being the Msta, the Pola, the Lovat, and the Shelon. It is drained through a single outlet, the Volkhov, into Lake Ladoga, and subsequently via the Neva into the Gulf of Finland. The source of the Volkhov is marked by the Peryn Chapel built in the 1220s.

The basin of Lake Ilmen contains vast areas in Novgorod, Pskov, and Tver Oblasts of Russia, as well as minor areas in the north of Vitebsk Region in Belarus.

The water level is regulated by the Volkhov hydroelectric plant situated downstream the Volkhov River. Water temperature in July is 19-20 °C. The bathing season is about 90 days.

Lake Ilmen is navigable. Shipping lines are Veliky Novgorod – Staraya Russa and Veliky Novgorod – Shimsk. There is a fishery in the lake.

The lake area was the location of an important battle during World War II, the Demyansk Pocket.
