= Staraya Russa =

Town in Novgorod Oblast, Russia

Staraya Russa Старая Русса
- Town
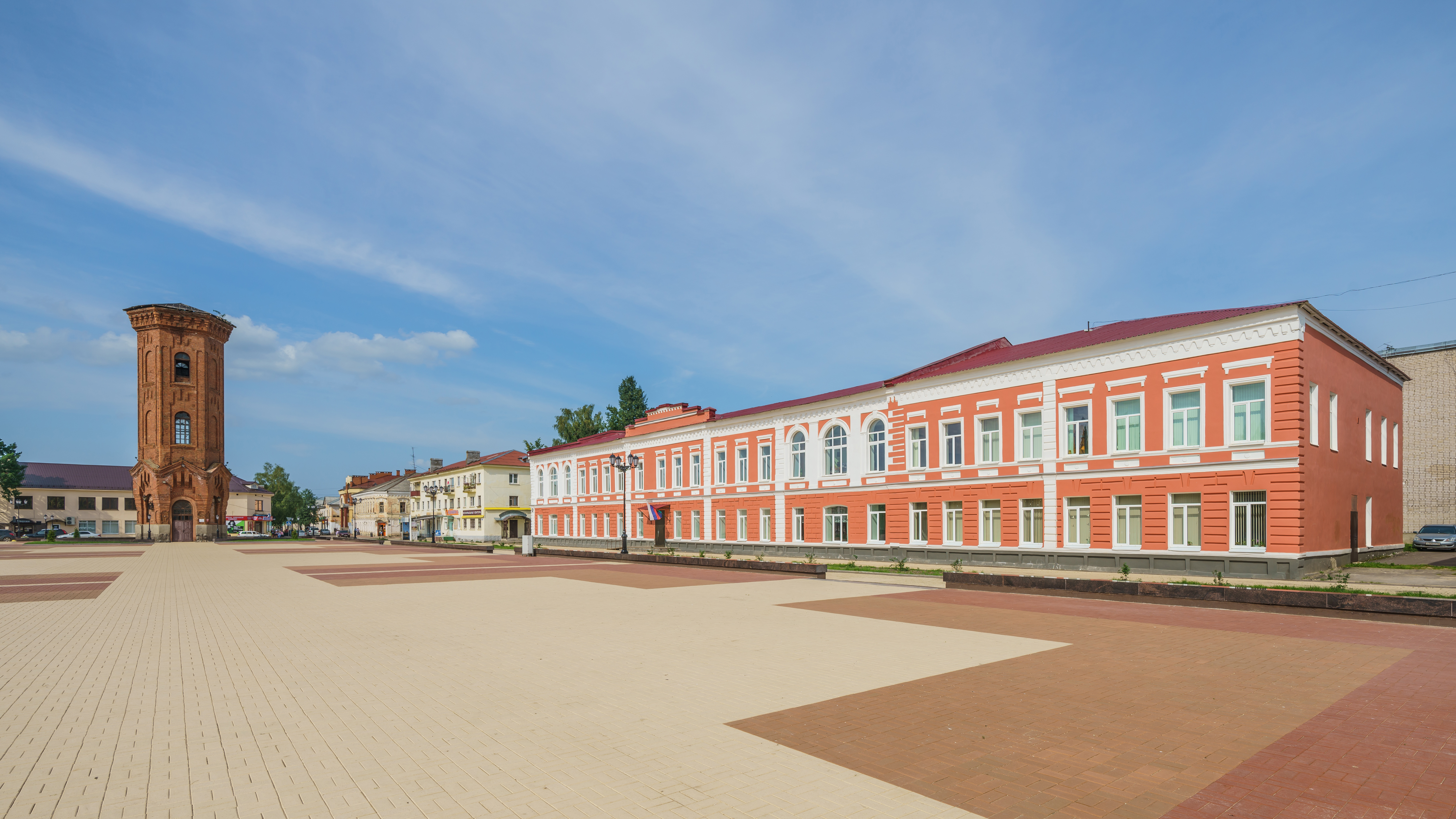
- Cathedral Square in Staraya Russa

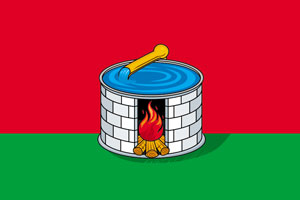
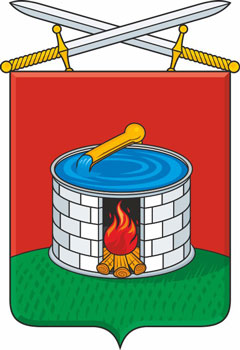
- Flag Coat of arms
- Interactive map of Staraya Russa
- Location of Staraya Russa Staraya Russa (Novgorod Oblast)
- Coordinates: 58°00′N 31°20′E
- Country: Russia
- Federal subject: Novgorod Oblast
- First mentioned: 1167
- Elevation: 25 m (82 ft)

Population (2010 Census)
  - Total: 31,809
  - Estimate (2021): 27,487 (−13.6%)

Administrative status
  - Subordinated to: town of oblast significance of Staraya Russa
  - Capital of: town of oblast significance of Staraya Russa, Starorussky District

Municipal status
  - Municipal district: Starorussky Municipal District
  - Urban settlement: Staraya Russa Urban Settlement
  - Capital of: Starorussky Municipal District, Staraya Russa Urban Settlement
- Time zone: UTC+3 (MSK)
- Postal code: 175200–175207
- Dialing code: +7 81652
- OKTMO ID: 49639101001
- Website: admgorod.strussa.net

Staraya Russa (Russian: Старая Русса, lit. 'Old Russa', IPA: [ˈstarəjə ˈrusːə]) is a town in Novgorod Oblast, Russia, located on the Polist River, 99 kilometers (62 mi) south of Veliky Novgorod, the administrative center of the oblast. It serves as the administrative center of Starorussky District and is the third-largest settlement in the oblast, after Veliky Novgorod and Borovichi. Population: 27,487 (2021 census); 31,809 (2010 census); 35,511 (2002 census); 41,538 (1989 Soviet census).

== Etymology ==
The origin of the name of Staraya Russa is unclear. The most involved and widespread hypothesis was presented by philologists and linguists R. A. Akheyeva, V. L. Vasilyev, and M. V. Gorbanevsky. According to this hypothesis, Russa (like Russia) comes from the Rus'—a people who settled in the vicinity to control trade routes leading from Novgorod to Polotsk and Kiev—which, in turn, is usually thought to originate from an Old Norse term for "the men who row" (rods-) as rowing was the main method of navigating the rivers of Eastern Europe, and that it could be linked to the Swedish coastal area of Roslagen (the rowing crews) or Roden, as it was known in earlier times.

Staraya is Russian for 'old' and was added to the name of the settlement around the 15th century to distinguish it from other settlements called Russa. Staraya Russa is therefore sometimes literally translated as 'Old Russia'.

== History ==
=== Medieval period ===
A ten-ruble coin depicting Staraya Russa, 2003

Staraya Russa is thought to have been founded at the turn of the 10th and 11th centuries as a commercial and craft settlement. It is one of the oldest towns in the Novgorod region; it is first mentioned as Rusa (Russian: Руса) in a Novgorodian birch-bark letter dating to the second third of the 11th century and in the Novgorod First Chronicle under the year 1167–1168. The presence of mineral springs was significant for the town's development. The brine from the springs supported salt production, which became the town's principal industry; Staraya Russa was the largest salt-producing center in the Novgorod region.

It was as one of three main towns of the Novgorod Republic, alongside Pskov and Ladoga. The town's fortifications are first mentioned as being constructed under 1199 and 1201. In the 13th century, the town suffered from Lithuanian raids, with the most notable ones occurring in 1224 and 1234. In the 14th and 15th centuries trade, crafts, and stone construction flourished. By the end of the 15th century, Staraya Russa held considerable importance and it comprised four kontsy ('ends'), or boroughs, and one slobodka. The exact number of households around this time is unknown, but it is estimated to have contained around one thousand households.

In 1478, it was incorporated into the centralized Russian state, together with the rest of the Novgorod Republic. From this point onward, it became the center of an uyezd. In the mid-16th century, it was the fourth-largest town in Russia by number of households. The word staraya ('old') was added to the name sometime during the 15th century. Nevertheless, the current name was firmly established only in the 19th century, when the salt mining settlements around the town became collectively known as Novaya Russa ('New Russa').

=== Early modern period ===
During the Livonian War, Staraya Russa was devastated by Polish–Lithuanian forces on two occasions. During the Time of Troubles, it captured by the forces of False Dmitry II in 1608. From 1611 to 1617, it was under Swedish occupation. The Treaty of Stolbovo confirmed its return to the Russian state.

In the course of the administrative reform carried out in 1708 by Peter the Great, Staraya Russa was included into Ingermanland Governorate (known since 1710 as St. Petersburg Governorate). In 1727, Novgorod Governorate was separated, and in 1776, Staraya Russa became the seat of Starorussky Uyezd of Novgorod Viceroyalty. In 1796, the viceroyalty was again transformed into Novgorod Governorate. Catherine II appointed German mineralogy expert Franz Ludwig von Cancrin as director of the salt-works in 1783.

=== Late modern period ===
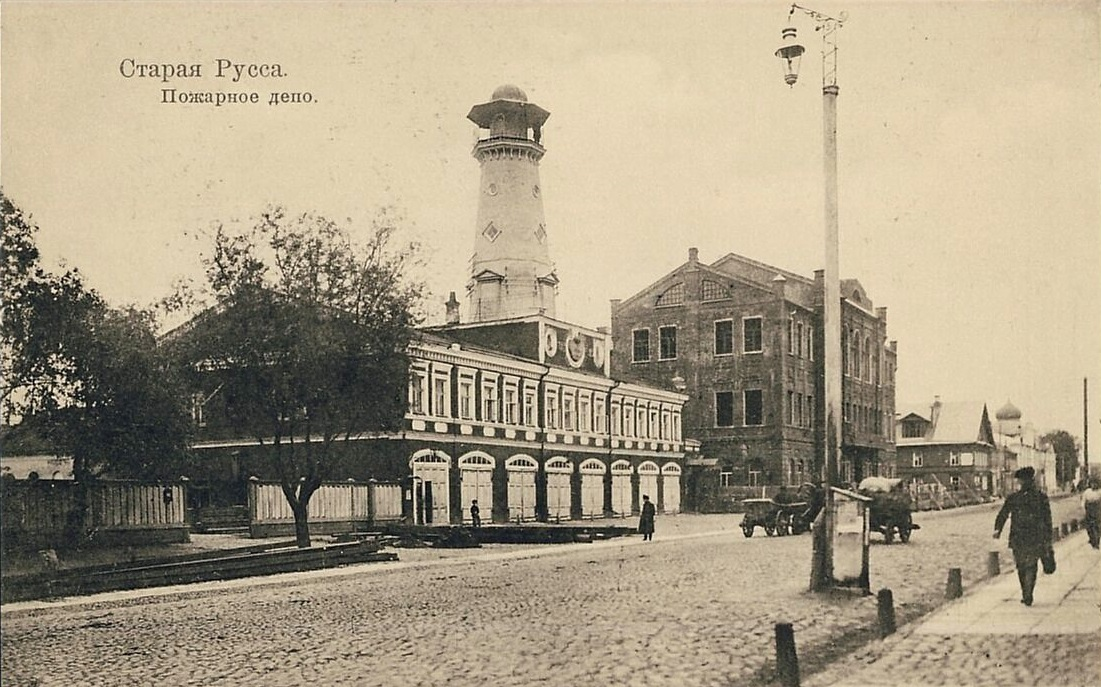
Town center in the 1910s

In the 1820s, military settlements were organized in Staraya Russa and around, in accordance with the project designed by Aleksey Arakcheyev, an influential statesman. It was inconvenient to have both civil and military administration in Staraya Russa, and therefore the uyezd was abolished in 1824. The town of Staraya Russa and some adjacent territories were directly subordinated to the Ministry of Defense. The military settlements were proven inefficient, and in particular, a cholera riot occurred in the town in 1831. They were abolished in 1856. In 1857, Starorussky Uyezd was re-established.

Soviet authority in Staraya Russa was established in November 1917. In August 1927, the uyezds were abolished and, effective October 1, 1927, Starorussky District was established, with the administrative center in Staraya Russa. Novgorod Governorate was abolished as well and the district became a part of Novgorod Okrug of Leningrad Oblast. On July 23, 1930, the okrugs were abolished and the districts were directly subordinated to the oblast.

=== World War II ===
On September 19, 1939, Staraya Russa was elevated in status to that of a town of oblast significance and thus ceased to be a part of the district.

The town was occupied by the Germans from August 9, 1941 until its liberation on February 18, 1944 by Red Army units during the Staraya Russa–Novorzhev offensive. The Germans operated the Dulag 110 prisoner-of-war camp in the town. The town was heavily damaged during the occupation and later received the title of City of Military Glory in 2015.

On July 5, 1944, Staraya Russa was transferred to newly established Novgorod Oblast and remained there ever since.

== Administrative and municipal status ==
Within the framework of administrative divisions, Staraya Russa serves as the administrative center of Starorussky District, even though it is not a part of it. As an administrative division, it is, together with two rural localities, incorporated separately as the Town of oblast significance of Staraya Russa—an administrative unit with the status equal to that of the districts (one of the three in Novgorod Oblast). As a municipal division, the town of oblast significance of Staraya Russa is incorporated within Starorussky Municipal District as Staraya Russa Urban Settlement.

== Climate ==
Climate data for Staraya Russa (extremes 1936–present)
Month	Jan	Feb	Mar	Apr	May	Jun	Jul	Aug	Sep	Oct	Nov	Dec	Year
Record high °C (°F)	10.2 (50.4)	10.9 (51.6)	18.3 (64.9)	26.4 (79.5)	32.6 (90.7)	34.2 (93.6)	35.4 (95.7)	36.4 (97.5)	31.2 (88.2)	24.0 (75.2)	13.6 (56.5)	12.2 (54.0)	36.4 (97.5)
Mean daily maximum °C (°F)	−2.9 (26.8)	−2.4 (27.7)	3.2 (37.8)	11.3 (52.3)	17.9 (64.2)	21.6 (70.9)	23.9 (75.0)	22.2 (72.0)	16.4 (61.5)	9.1 (48.4)	2.4 (36.3)	−1.2 (29.8)	10.1 (50.2)
Daily mean °C (°F)	−5.4 (22.3)	−5.6 (21.9)	−0.9 (30.4)	6.1 (43.0)	12.3 (54.1)	16.3 (61.3)	18.6 (65.5)	16.7 (62.1)	11.5 (52.7)	5.7 (42.3)	0.2 (32.4)	−3.3 (26.1)	6.0 (42.8)
Mean daily minimum °C (°F)	−8.3 (17.1)	−8.9 (16.0)	−4.7 (23.5)	1.4 (34.5)	6.6 (43.9)	10.8 (51.4)	13.2 (55.8)	11.5 (52.7)	7.2 (45.0)	2.7 (36.9)	−2.0 (28.4)	−5.8 (21.6)	2.0 (35.6)
Record low °C (°F)	−41.5 (−42.7)	−40.1 (−40.2)	−31.1 (−24.0)	−26.5 (−15.7)	−5.5 (22.1)	−1.3 (29.7)	4.0 (39.2)	0.3 (32.5)	−6.0 (21.2)	−13.2 (8.2)	−27.5 (−17.5)	−40.6 (−41.1)	−41.5 (−42.7)
Average precipitation mm (inches)	44.5 (1.75)	35.6 (1.40)	32.0 (1.26)	40.0 (1.57)	60.2 (2.37)	74.0 (2.91)	78.9 (3.11)	75.0 (2.95)	53.9 (2.12)	61.8 (2.43)	56.4 (2.22)	45.1 (1.78)	657.4 (25.87)
Source: pogoda.ru.net

== Demographics ==
Historical population

Year	Pop.	±%
1926	21,511	—
1939	37,258	+73.2%
1959	25,409	−31.8%
1970	34,577	+36.1%
1979	40,439	+17.0%

Year	Pop.	±%
1989	41,538	+2.7%
2002	35,511	−14.5%
2010	31,809	−10.4%
2021	27,487	−13.6%

Source: Censuses

== Economy ==
=== Industry ===
The biggest enterprise in Staraya Russa is the aircraft repair works. The mechanical engineering plant went bankrupt in 2011 and no longer exists.

=== Transportation ===
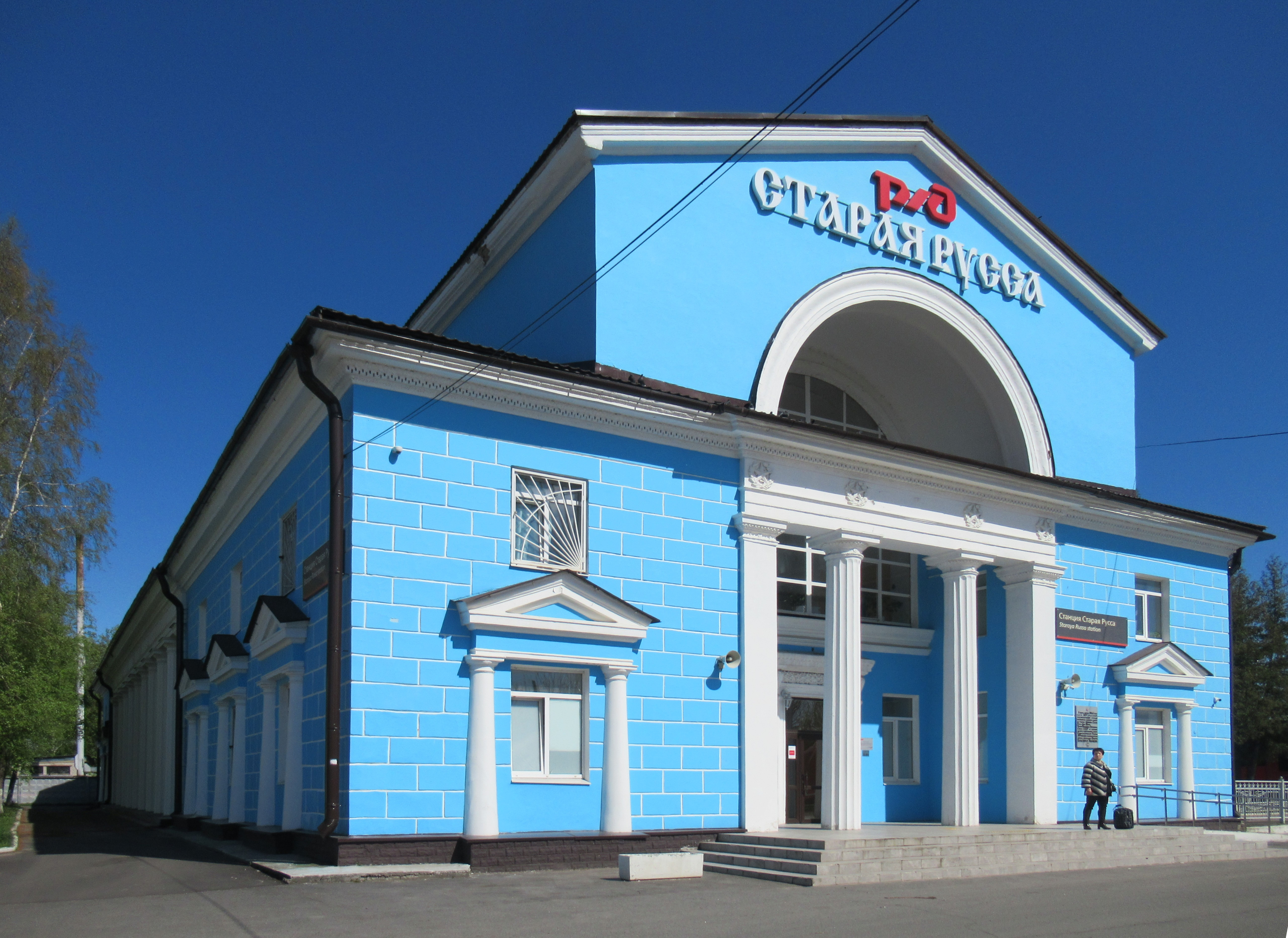
Railway station

A railway which connects Bologoye and Pskov passes through Staraya Russa.

Staraya Russa is connected by roads with Novgorod, Demyansk, and Bezhanitsy via Kholm. There are also local roads.

There is a wharf on the Polist River in the Lake Ilmen basin. The Polist is navigable downstream from Staraya Russa.

The town is served by the Staraya Russa Airport.

== Attractions ==
Staraya Russa is a spa. A summer residence of the Russian novelist Fyodor Dostoyevsky, who wrote his novels The Brothers Karamazov and Demons there, is open to visitors as a museum.

Monuments include the Transfiguration Monastery, which includes a cathedral built in seventy days in 1198 and partly rebuilt in the 15th century, and several 17th-century buildings and churches. The principal city cathedral (1678) is dedicated to the Resurrection of Christ. Other notable churches are consecrated to St. George (1410) (the Dostoyevsky family stayed in the house of the priest of this church), Mina the Martyr (14th century), and the Holy Trinity (1676).

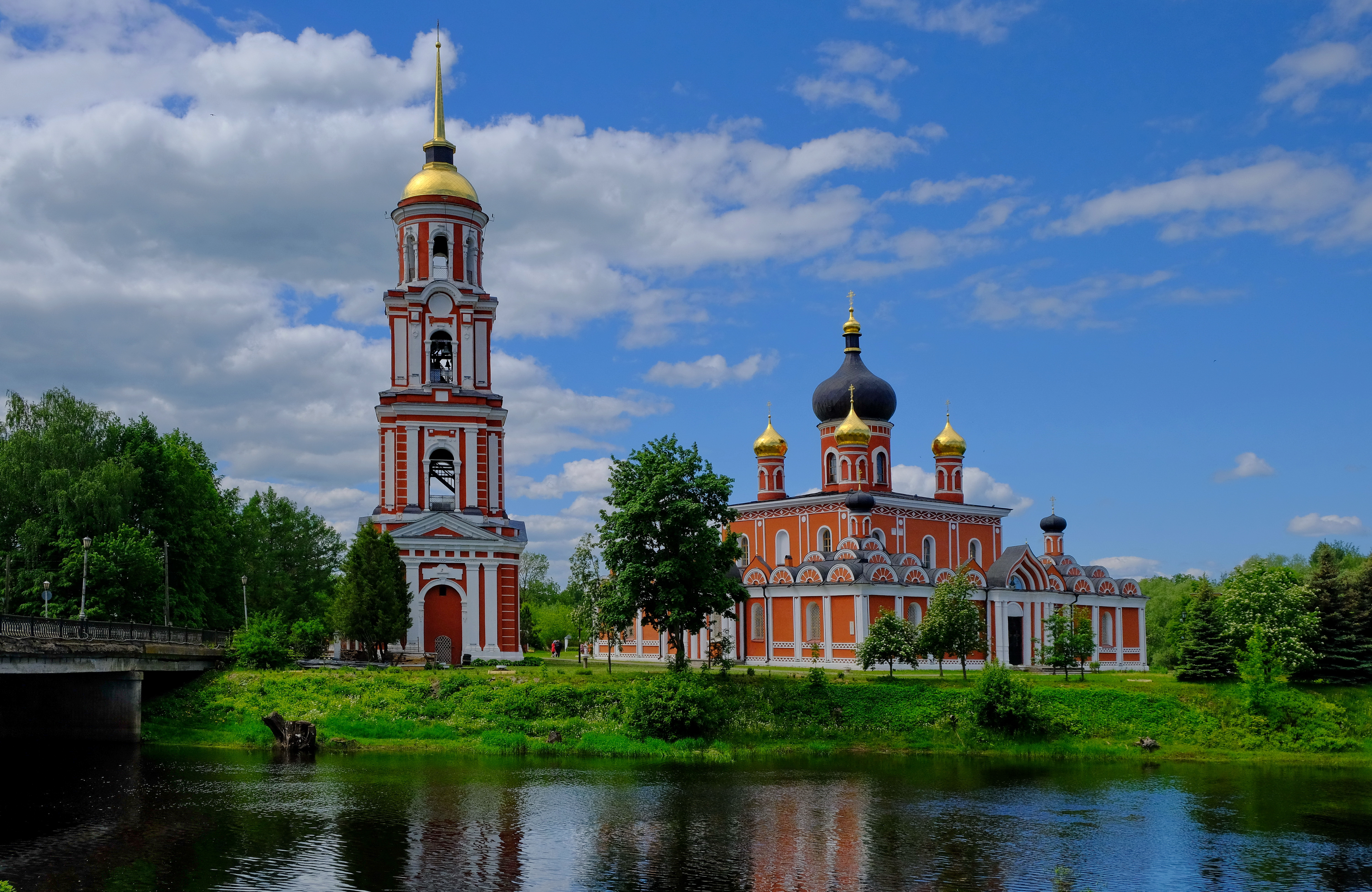
Church of the Resurrection of Christ

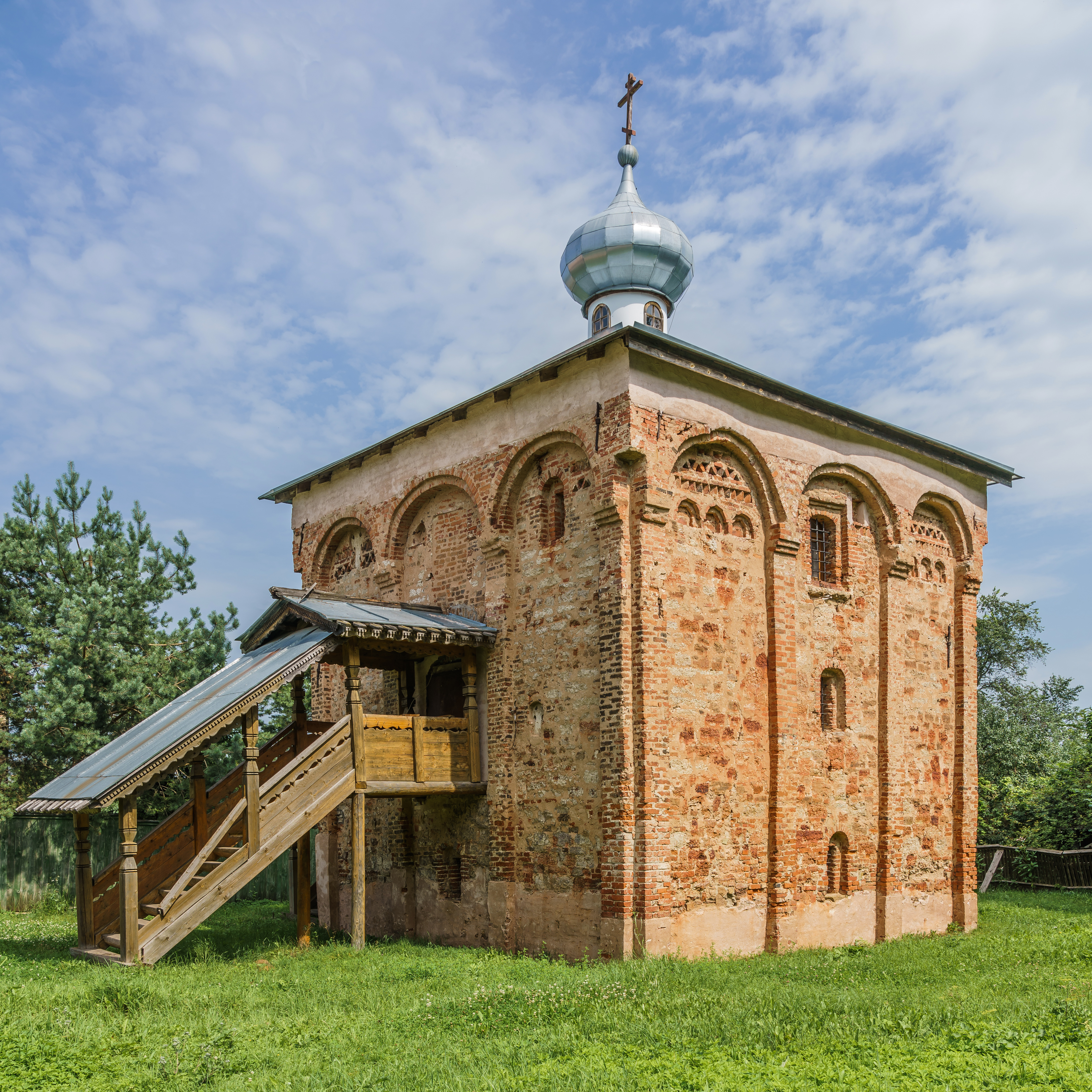
Saint Menas Church

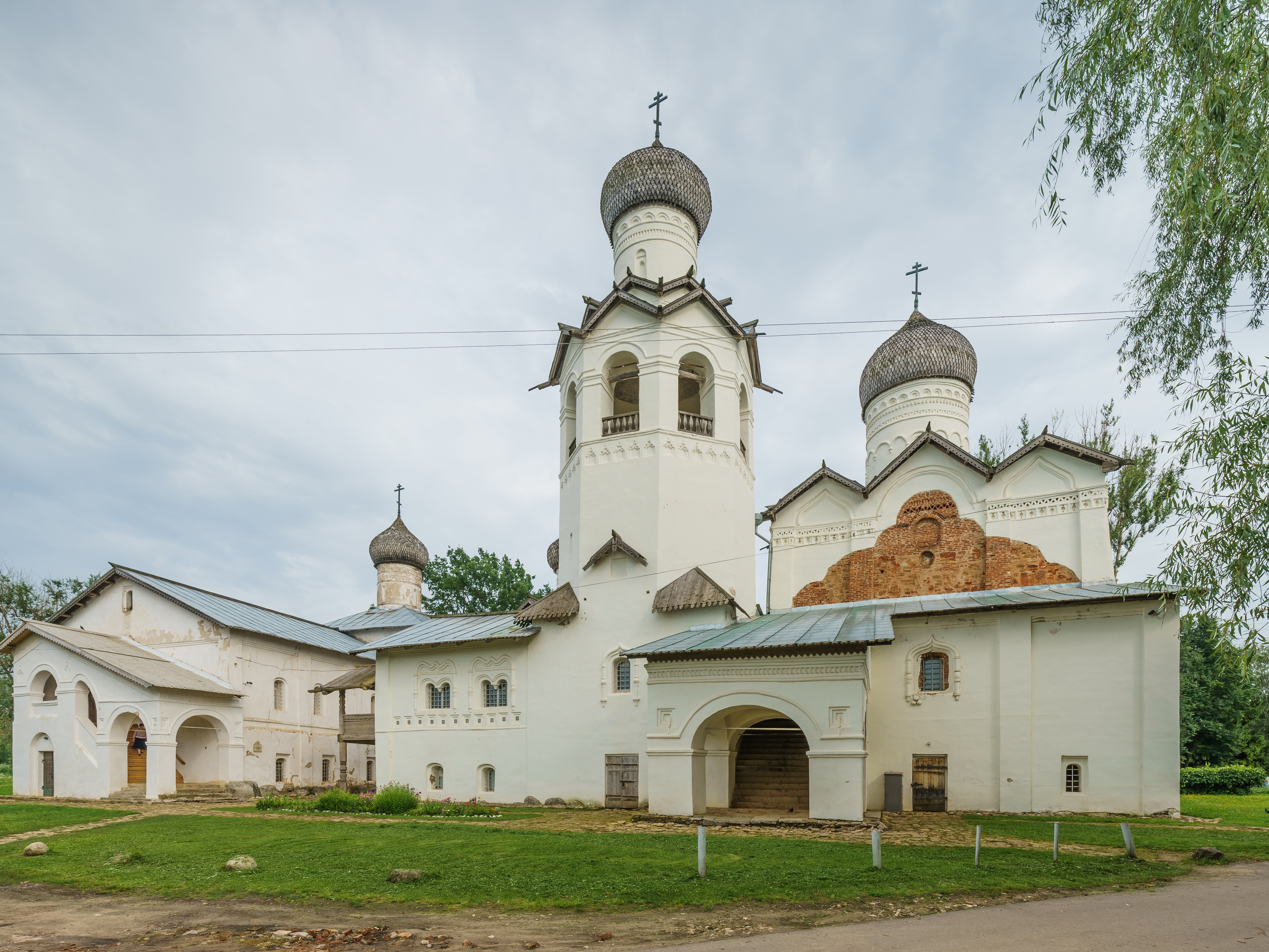
The Transfiguration Monastery

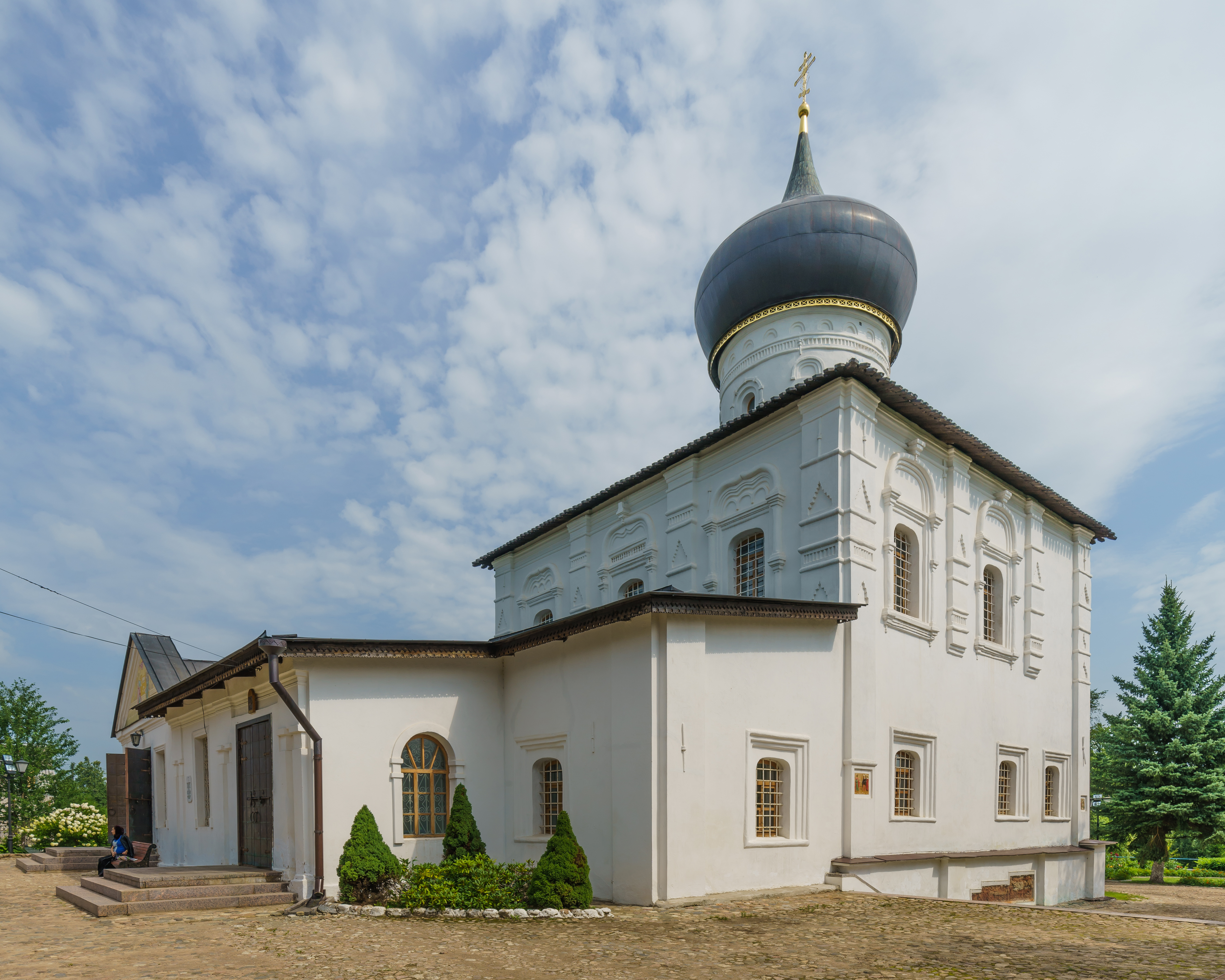
Church of St. George the Victorious

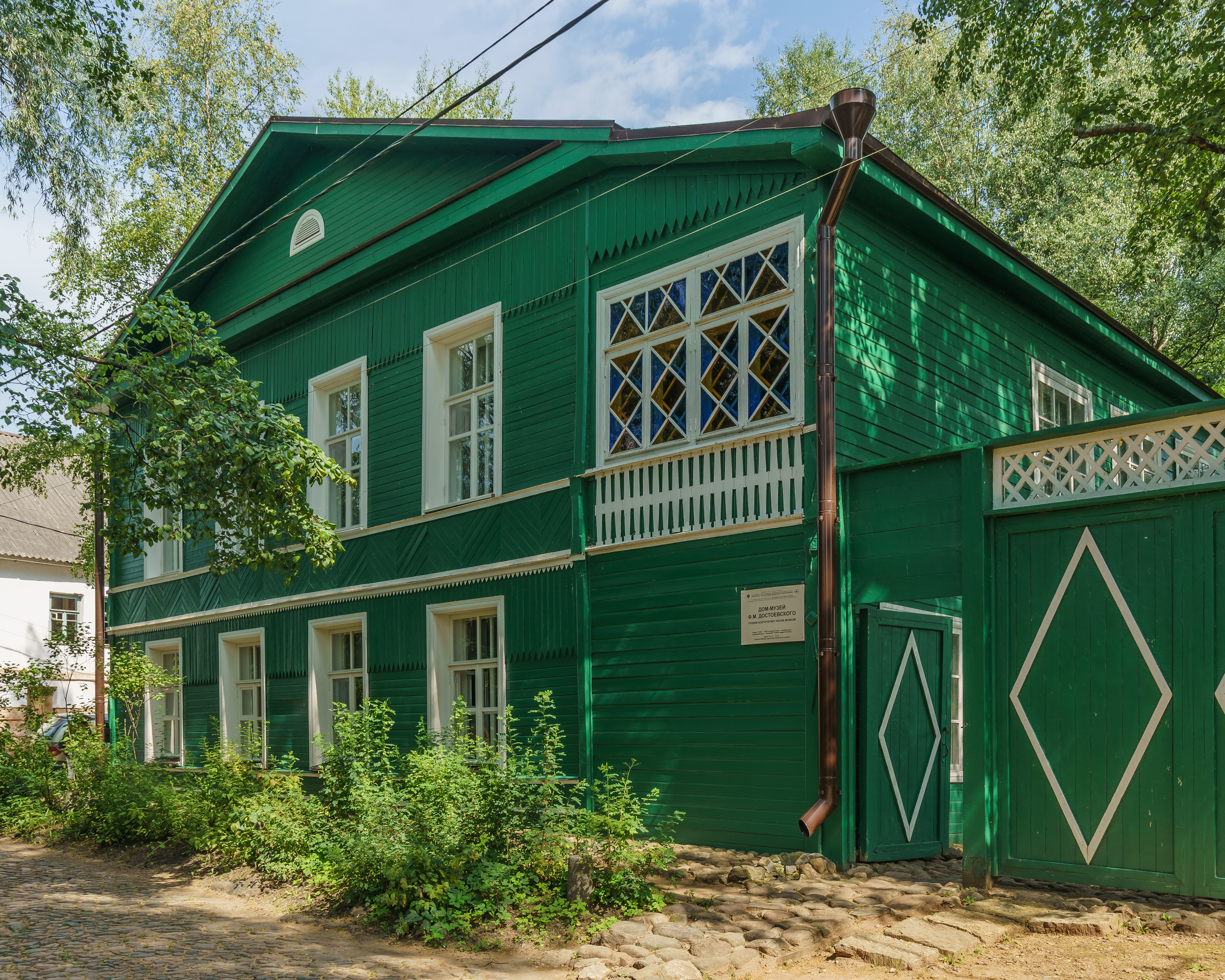
Fyodor Dostoevsky house museum

== Notable people ==
- Sergei Rachmaninoff was born in 1873, in the family estate in the village of Semyonovo, near Staraya Russa. His birth was registered in Semyonovo church book and signed by Priest Platon Savitsky and acolyte Peter Lubochsky
- Fyodor Dostoevsky owned a house in Staraya Russa.
