= Luga Defensive Line =

1941 System of Soviet fortifications

Luga defensive line
- Part of the Leningrad strategic defensive the Battle of Leningrad the Great Patriotic War; World War II
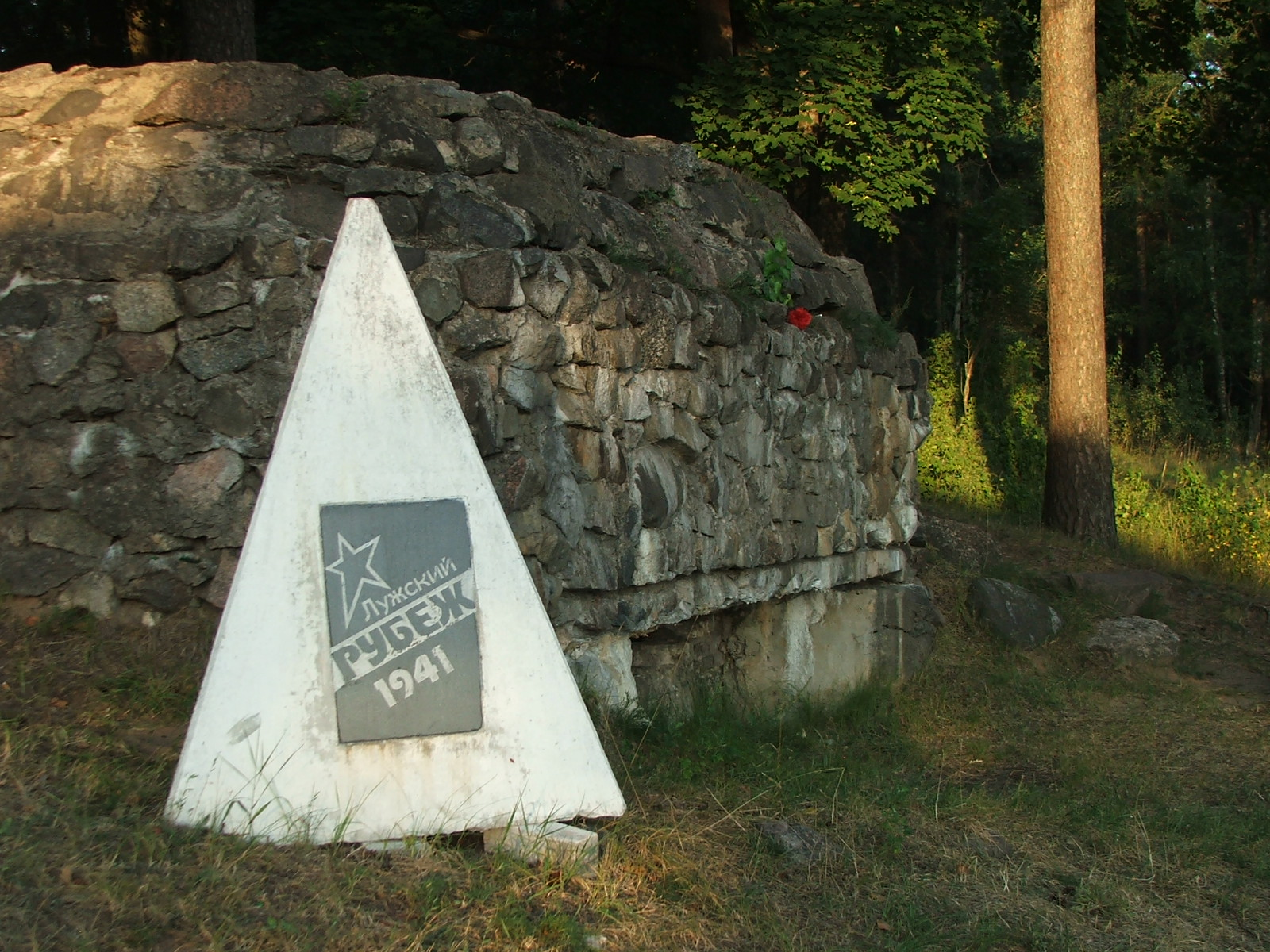
- Pillbox on Langina Hill, at the site of the Luga line 58°42′54″N 29°50′34″E
Date	10 July – 24 August 1941
Location	Luga, Shimsk, Kingisepp, Leningrad Oblast, Soviet Union
Result	Advance of Army Group North delayed by one month (in the Luga area for 45 days), line broken by German forces in the Shimsk and Kingisepp areas, Soviet forces encircled, abandoned the line and retreated

Belligerents
Nazi Germany Nazi Germany	USSR Soviet Union

Commanders and leaders
Wilhelm Ritter von Leeb; Georg von Küchler; Erich Hoepner; Ernst Busch; Erich von Manstein	Kliment Voroshilov; Markian Popov; Konstantin Pyadyshev; Andrey Astanin; Filipp Starikov; Stepan Akimov; Valentin Semashko

Strength
Army Group North	Luga Operational Group: more than 100,000 men

Casualties and losses
	55,535 men

The Luga Defensive Line (Luga fortified position; Russian: Лужский оборонительный рубеж) was a system of Soviet fortifications (defensive line) of approximately 300 kilometres long, built in June–August 1941 on the territory of Leningrad region, (Note: In 1941, there was no separate Novgorod Oblast administrative entity. Almost its entire territory was part of Leningrad Oblast, while Kholmsky District was part of Kalinin Oblast.) from the Narva Gulf, along the rivers Luga, Mshaga, Shelon to Lake Ilmen with the aim of preventing a breakthrough by troops of the German Army Group North to the north-east in the direction of Leningrad.

Major defensive operations of the Soviet Red Army took place at the line in July and August of 1941 halting Wehrmacht's rapid advance across the Baltic states and delaying its approach to Leningrad by about a month. The line was abandoned towards the end of August.

== Background ==
=== Strategic importance of Leningrad ===
On 18 December 1940, Hitler signed Directive No. 21, known as the Barbarossa Operation. This plan envisaged an attack on the Soviet Union by three army groups along three main directions: Army Group North towards Leningrad, Army Group Center towards Moscow, and Army Group South towards Kiev and the Donbas. After the capture of Leningrad and Kronstadt, Army Group North was to turn its armies eastward, encircling Moscow from the north. In Directive No. 32 of 11 June 1941, Hitler set the timing for the completion of the "victorious campaign in the East" as the end of autumn. Franz Halder, Chief of Staff of the High Command of the Ground Forces of the Wehrmacht, wrote the following in his diary on 8 July 1941:

The Führer's decision is unshakable to raze Moscow and Leningrad to the ground, in order to completely get rid of the population of these cities, which otherwise we would then be forced to feed during the winter. The task of destroying these cities is to be carried out by aviation. Tanks should not be used for this. It will be "a national calamity that will deprive not only Bolshevism, but also the Muscovites (Russians) in general of their centers".

By the beginning of World War II, Leningrad was a leading industrial and cultural center of the country, with a population of 3,191,300. In terms of the value of gross industrial output, it ranked second after Moscow in 1940 and was the flagship of shipbuilding. Thirty percent of military production was concentrated in Leningrad. The Leningrad port played an important role in the country's foreign trade. By capturing Leningrad, the Germans would also gain control of the Baltic Fleet, which hindered Germany's most important shipments from the Scandinavian countries, primarily iron ore from Sweden. The fall of the city on the Neva would allow the unification of Wehrmacht forces with the Finnish army and a breakthrough into operational space east of Lake Ladoga. Such a breakthrough in the direction of Vologda and beyond could lead to the disruption of rail transport and the blockade of shipments from Murmansk and Arkhangelsk. With the fall of Leningrad, German forces would gain unhindered access to the expanses of the north of the Soviet Union, and they could be thrown towards Moscow from the north, which would change the entire strategic situation on the Soviet-German front.

=== Northwestern Front before the start of the Battle for Leningrad events ===
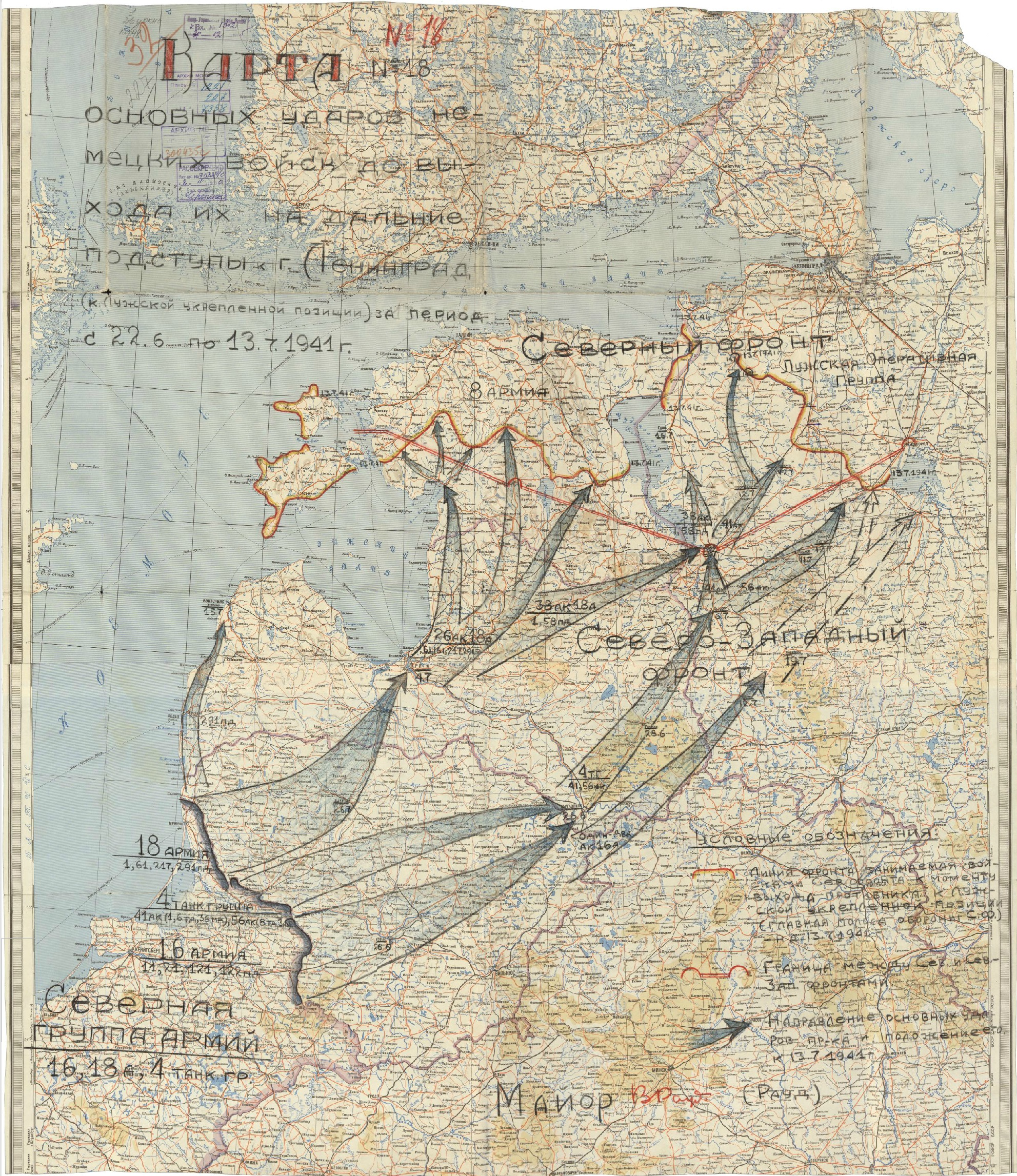
Map of the main strikes by German troops until they reached the distant approaches to Leningrad (to the Luga fortified position) for the period from 22 June 1941 to 13 July 1941.

The approaches to the northern territories of the USSR were covered by the Northern and Northwestern Fronts.

- The Northern Front was formed on 24 June 1941 on the basis of the Leningrad Military District and covered the territory of the Kola Peninsula, Karelia, and Leningrad Oblast, defending Leningrad from the north. The front was commanded by Lieutenant General M. M. Popov, with Major General D. N. Nikishev as chief of staff.
- The Northwestern Front was formed on 24 June 1941 on the basis of the Baltic Special Military District, and with the start of the war, its troops fought on the territory of the Baltic Soviet republics. The front was commanded by Colonel General F. I. Kuznetsov, with Lieutenant General P. S. Klyonov as chief of staff. The border battles and fighting by the front's troops, which began on 22 June 1941, were lost by the end of 25 June. By early July, the Northwestern Front's troops failed to hold back the enemy and retreated to a depth of up to 500 km into the northwestern regions of Russia, ending up in the south of Leningrad Oblast. For inept troop management, the entire command of the Northwestern Front was removed from their posts. At the same time, although the Wehrmacht command achieved significant advances, it failed to encircle and destroy the Soviet troops.

In the first days of July, due to a shortage of forces and resources on the Northwestern Front, the Stavka instructed that troops from the Northern Front, previously tasked only with defending the city from the north, be involved in the defense of Leningrad from the southwest. The boundary between the fronts was set along the line Pskov–Novgorod, with the defense of the territory of the Estonian SSR remaining the responsibility of the Northwestern Front's troops. On 4 July, Lieutenant General P. P. Sobennikov assumed command of the front. Corps Commissar V. N. Bogatkin was appointed as a member of the military council, and General N. F. Vatutin—deputy chief of the General Staff, who had been at the front since 22 June 1941—became chief of staff. Under these conditions, the main task of the Soviet troops in this theater of operations was to prevent the enemy from breaking through to Leningrad and Novgorod, as well as to cover Tallinn, which was the main base of the Baltic Fleet. On 8 July 1941, the high command of the German armed forces set the following task for the troops of Army Group North: to cut off Leningrad from the east and southeast with a strong right wing of the panzer group from the rest of the USSR. On 10 July, the troops of Army Group North began an offensive towards Leningrad from the line of the Velikaya River along the directions Pskov–Luga and Ostrov–Novgorod. On the same day, units of the Karelian Army of Finland began an offensive against the positions of the 7th Army of the Northern Front in Karelia. The date of 10 July 1941 and the line of the Velikaya River are considered by most researchers to be the beginning of the battle for Leningrad and its initial line.

== Location ==
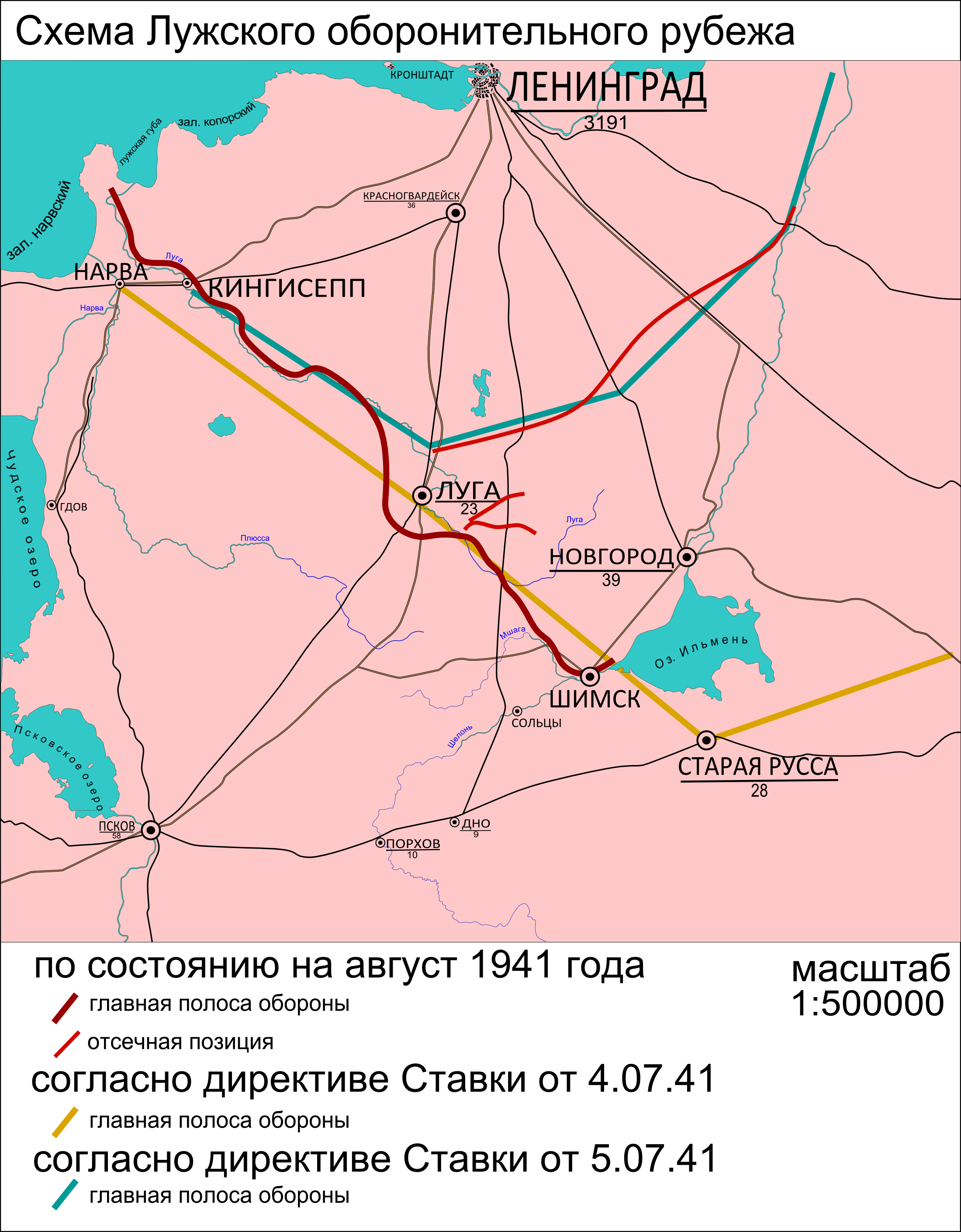
Diagram of the location of the Luga defensive line

The initial plan for defensive fortifications, developed by a group under the deputy commander of the Leningrad Military District, Lieutenant General K. P. Pyadyshev, envisaged a belt of fortifications from the Gulf of Finland along the banks of the rivers Luga, Mshaga, and Shelon to Lake Ilmen, nearly 250 km.

The Luga Defensive Line appeared on the map as a single line from the western coast of Narva Bay in the area of Preobrazhenka station along the Luga River, to Kingisepp, then to Porechye, Sabsk, Tolmachyovo. Around the city of Luga, a defensive bypass was planned along lakes and swampy areas, with the line then returning to the Luga River southeast of the city. Further, the line ran to Peredolskaya, Mshaga, Shimsk, to Lake Ilmen. In the center, Pyadyshev designated the main defensive hub, including the city of Luga, with a cut-off position Luga–Tolmachyovo. Another cut-off position was planned east and northeast of Tolmachyovo. It crossed the main roads leading to Leningrad from Pskov, Porkhov, Novgorod, and the Oktyabrskaya Railway.

On 4 July 1941, the Chief of the General Staff, General G. K. Zhukov, transmitted to the Military Council of the Northern Front Directive No. 91/NGSH of the Stavka of the Main Command on preparing defenses on the approaches to Leningrad. This directive ordered the occupation of the defensive line Narva, Luga, Staraya Russa, Borovichi, and the creation of a forefield with a depth of 10–15 km. Thus, in fact, with its decision of 4 July, the Stavka retroactively approved the measures that had been proposed and were already being implemented by the command of the Northern Front.

On 5 July 1941, signed by Army General G. K. Zhukov, a new directive on preparing a defensive line on the approaches to Leningrad from the Stavka of the Supreme High Command arrived, and it was addressed to the Military Council of the Leningrad Military District. (Note: In accordance with the General Staff directive, in July 1941, the administration of the Leningrad Military District was formed. The district's tasks: preparation of reserves, formation and training of units and formations. In August 1941, the district administration was disbanded. (Shigin 2004)) It ordered the construction of a defensive line on the front Kingisepp, Tolmachyovo, Ogoreli, Babino, Kirishi, and further along the western bank of the Volkhov River. Particular attention was to be paid to firmly covering the directions Gdov–Leningrad, Luga–Leningrad, and Shimsk–Leningrad. Construction of the line was to begin immediately. Completion of construction—15 July 1941.

As a result, in August, the main defensive line and two cut-off positions were created. The main belt ran from the Gulf of Finland along the right bank of the Luga River to the Muraveyno state farm, then through the settlements Krasnye Gory, Daryino, Leskovo, Smerdi, Streshevo, Onezhitsy, along the right bank of the Luga River from Onezhitsy to Osvina, and further through the settlements Ozhogin Volochyok, Unomer, Medved, along the Kiba River, from the settlement of Medved to Pegasino along the left bank of the Mshaga River, and further to Golino along the left bank of the Shelon River.

- The first cut-off position consisted of two belts:
  - The first, 28 km long, ran from the village of Rakovno to the village of Vychelobok along the right bank of the Luga River, further along the right bank of the Udrayka River, to the village of Radoli.
  - The second belt, 20 km long, ran from Kolodno, Chyornaya to Zaklinye along the Chyornaya River.
- The second cut-off position stretched from the Muraveyno state farm to Ploskovo along the right bank of the Luga River, further along the Oredez River, Lake Khvoylovo, Lake Antonovo, Lake Pristanskoye, the Rydenka River, and along the Ravan River to Fyodorovka, further along the rivers Tigoda and Volkhov to Kirishi. The length along the front was 182 km.

== Construction ==
=== Organization ===
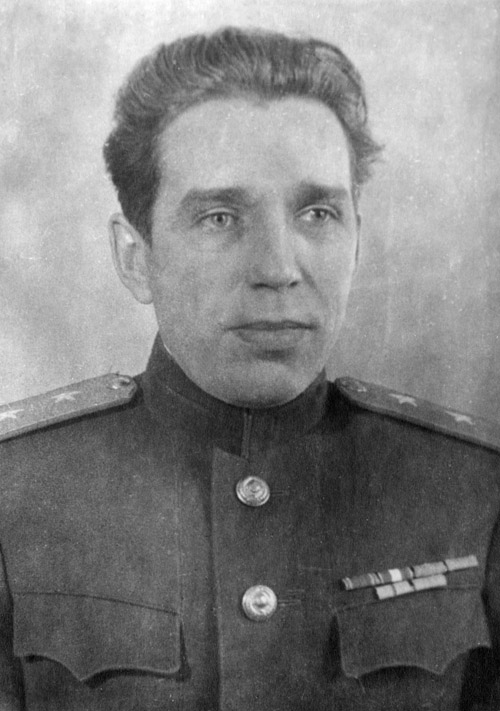
A. A. Kuznetsov, member of the military council, oversaw the defensive construction

On 22 June, Deputy People's Commissar of Defense of the USSR K. A. Meretskov, who had urgently arrived in Leningrad, recommended that the Commander of the Leningrad Military District Lieutenant General M. M. Popov begin selecting and reconnoitering possible defensive lines between Pskov and Leningrad, with immediate deployment of defensive works thereafter, involving available troops and, most importantly, the local population. This task was assigned to Popov's deputy, Lieutenant General K. P. Pyadyshev; under his leadership, a large group of specialists and military engineers worked on calculations for the construction of defensive fortifications.

In the morning of 24 June, Pyadyshev reported on the composition, procedure, and timelines of the reconnaissance groups, as well as the approximate organization and sequence of defensive construction. The main line was designated as the Luga River along almost its entire length, and further the Mshaga, Shimsk, to Lake Ilmen, with a developed and fortified forefield, starting from the Plyussa River. Two more defensive lines were planned on the near approaches to Leningrad. The creation of the Luga defensive belt, stretching for 250 km, was particularly labor-intensive and complex. It was to consist of two defensive belts and one cut-off position, running along the banks of numerous lakes and rivers. Appointed were: engineering chief of the Luga group of troops Lieutenant Colonel A. D. Tsirlin, and chief of construction of the Luga defensive belt Major M. M. Zyazin.

On 25 June, the Military Council of the Northern Front approved the basic conceptual scheme for constructing defensive lines on the approaches to and within the city itself. The plan envisaged the construction of three lines:

- the first—from the Gulf of Finland along the Luga and Mshaga rivers to Shimsk and Lake Ilmen;
- the second was to be equipped along the outer ring of the circular railway, along the line Peterhof–Krasnogvardeysk–Kolpino, and occupied by troops of the armies' second echelons;
- the third ran directly along the city's outskirts.

Simultaneously, seven sectors of defense within the city were planned.

It immediately became clear that the volume of work on the Luga line was so vast that it could not be completed within the set timeframe by army forces alone, and on 27 June, the executive committee of the Leningrad City Soviet of Workers' Deputies adopted a decision to involve the city's population and several suburban districts in labor conscription.

The defense plan for Leningrad, drawn up by the staff and envisaging broad participation of the population in its implementation, received approval from the party's and soviet leaders of the city and oblast, and on 27 June, it was reviewed by the secretary of the Central Committee of the All-Union Communist Party (Bolsheviks) and first secretary of the Leningrad oblast committee and city committee of the party, A. A. Zhdanov, who had returned to Leningrad from Moscow; he coordinated this plan with Stalin by telephone.

By decision of the Military Council, for the management of the construction of the Luga line, Construction Directorate No. 1 was formed by 28 June. The directorate's task was the construction of anti-tank and anti-personnel obstacles, as well as pillboxes. The core of the directorate consisted of officers and cadets from military engineering schools, as well as construction specialists from Leningrad. Design and on-site construction management were carried out by directorates of construction chiefs and separate construction sites. They were created on the basis of the Higher Naval Engineering and Construction School, the Leningrad Military Engineering School, and a number of construction organizations.

In late July–August 1941, the Military Council of the front took measures to improve on-site construction management, forming systems of bodies for managing military engineering works:

- Engineering Directorate of the front—commanded by Lieutenant Colonel B. V. Bychevsky, who was entrusted with managing the work of troops and sapper units in contact with the enemy.
- Directorate for Construction of Rear Defensive Lines (USTOR). It was headed by the assistant commander of the district for fortified regions, Major General P. A. Zaitsev.

Overall management of the entire complex of defensive construction, coordination of the work of the front's Engineering and Construction Directorates, including the involvement of material and labor resources from Leningrad and the oblast, was carried out by member of the Military Council of the front, secretary of the city party committee A. A. Kuznetsov.

The design of Leningrad's defensive lines was assigned to a group of experts under the chief of engineering defense of Leningrad. The group was headed by academician B. G. Galerkin. The expert group included B. D. Vasilyev, N. A. Kandyba, N. I. Ungerman, S. A. Shustikov, and S. S. Golushkevich.

This achieved better interaction between the front's Engineering and Construction Directorates than in the first stage. The troika became the working body of the Military Council of the Northern Front for accelerating construction in the most dangerous sectors.

From this time, the sectoral principle was laid as the basis for dividing defensive lines and organizing construction. In total, 8 sectors of defensive works were created: 5 on the distant and 3 on the near southern and southwestern approaches to Leningrad. In each sector, a headquarters for defensive construction was created, the roster of engineering units, construction organizations, and builders was determined. The procedure for resolving tactical issues between troop chiefs, commandants, and sector chiefs of defensive works was established. Within twenty days, the military-engineering management apparatus for defensive construction had grown significantly and numbered nearly 700 people.

=== City enterprises capacities usage ===
On 27 June 1941, the Military Council of the front adopted a resolution to halt construction of the Leningrad Metro, the Verkhnesvirskaya Hydroelectric Power Plant, the Enso HPP, the Enso–Leningrad power transmission line, and other facilities; this made it possible to direct the most qualified cadres of military and civilian builders to the construction of permanent firing points. (Note: According to the personal instruction of A.A. Zhdanov, Leningrad metro builders were not conscripted into the army or militia; they were to work on the construction of defensive fortifications around Leningrad. (Bychevsky 1967, p. 18)) At the beginning of the war, there were 75 construction and installation organizations of all-union and republican subordination in Leningrad, employing over 97,000 people. In total, including workers from enterprises' capital construction departments and repair-construction offices, more than 133,000 builders worked in Leningrad. At their disposal were trucks, equipment, cement, rebar, and other construction materials available at enterprises, institutions, and households. The main cadres for works requiring the highest qualifications were 12 construction battalions numbering up to 7,000 people, the Leningrad District Military Construction Directorate, construction trusts No. 16, 35, 38, 40, 53, 58, "Soyuzekskavatsiya", Construction No. 5 of the NKPS, Trust No. 2 of the NKVD for Leningrad Oblast. The most complex works were assigned to the Leningrad metro builders. However, the heaviest and most labor-intensive earthworks were performed by mobilized workers and employees from the civilian population. They accounted for 88% of all labor expenditures. The number of builders (excluding engineering-construction units and construction organizations) working on the approaches to the city in mid-August exceeded 450,000 people. While the entire working population of the city on 1 August was 1,453,000 people.

The Military Council of the Northern Front also adopted a series of decisions on material support for the front's engineering measures, and through the city committee of the All-Union Communist Party (Bolsheviks), orders were placed at factories for the production of anti-tank mines, barbed wire, concrete blocks for firing points, and other engineering barrier means. Within a day or two, Leningrad factories began supplying troops with essential engineering means. Crowbars, shovels, axes, and field kitchens began to be mass-produced and immediately sent to the construction of defensive lines. At the Izhora, Kirov, Baltic, Metal, and other factories and workshops, prefabricated armored bunkers, reinforced concrete gun and machine-gun armored caps, anti-tank obstacles, and Czech hedgehoges were manufactured. At the Avrov Factory and in the workshops of Drevtrest, the first 100,000 mines in wooden casings were produced, as it was impossible to quickly set up production of metal casings for mines. Leningrad scientists received an order from the engineering directorate of the Leningrad Front for the development of 25 special topics. Various types and designs of electrical barriers, first developed and applied on the lines of the Leningrad Front, later spread to other fronts. Thus, for the implementation of the project of a 40-kilometer section of electrical barriers Luga–Kingisepp, 320 km of high-voltage lines were installed and 25 electrical substations were built. For this special construction, materials and equipment from 42 factories and enterprises in Leningrad were mobilized. A group of specialists under the leadership of P. G. Kotov developed and manufactured bunkers from ship armor at Leningrad ship repair enterprises. In total, 600 such bunkers were manufactured for the defense of Leningrad in 1941. At the same time, on 11 July, the GKO adopted a resolution on the mass evacuation of Leningrad industry; 80 factories and 13 central design bureaus were to be relocated to cities in the Urals and Siberia. The evacuation of the most important enterprises in Leningrad began, primarily factories, plants, and a number of key research institutes.

=== Conditions and constructors' daily life ===
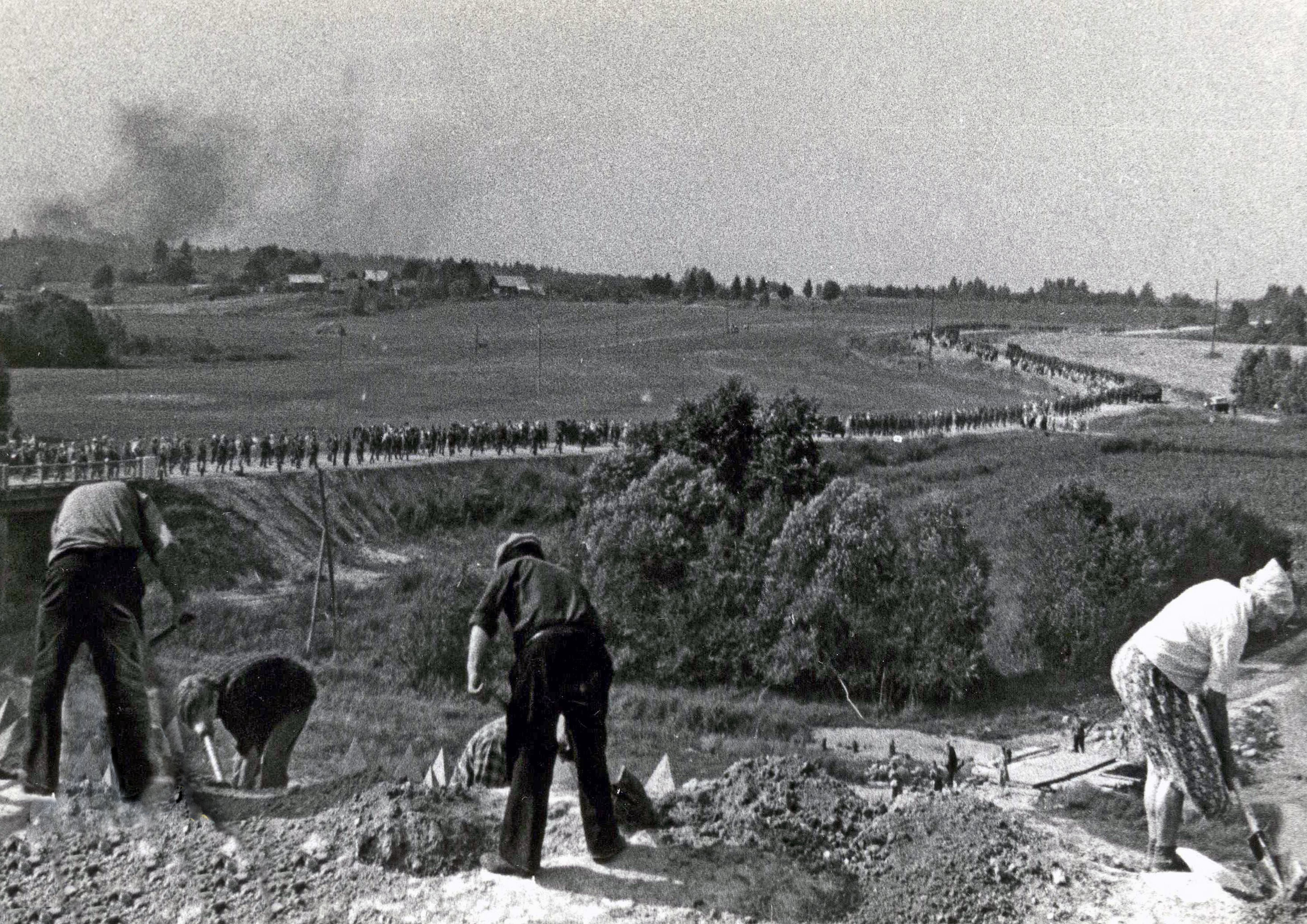
Leningrad residents constructing defensive fortifications—frame from the film "Luga Line" in the cinematic epic "Blockade" (1975)

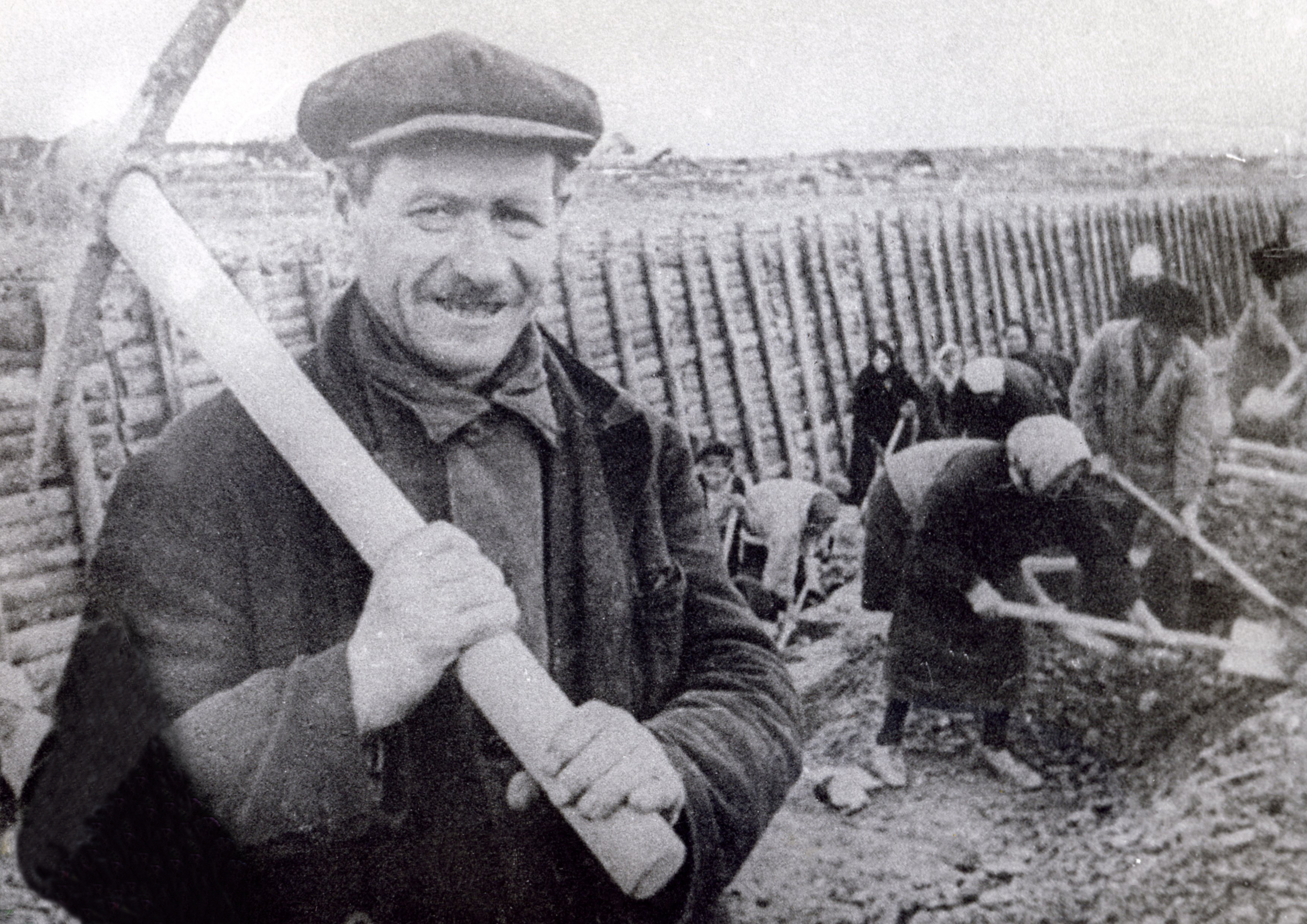
Construction of anti-tank ditches; the steep slope is reinforced with logs

On 27 June, labor conscription was introduced for residents of the city and suburban districts. All able-bodied citizens of both sexes were involved in the construction of defensive fortifications: men aged 16 to 50 and women aged 16 to 45, except those working in defense industry enterprises. Working hours were set: for non-working able-bodied citizens — 8 hours per day; for employees and workers — 3 hours per day after work; for students of functioning educational institutions — 3 hours per day after studies. The duration of continuous work for citizens involved in labor conscription was set at no more than 7 days, with a break of at least 4 days thereafter. Despite this, many of those sent to the works participated in construction for more than 7 days until the entire volume of work on their site was completed.

With the efforts of local enterprises and institutions, field baths and showers were organized for those working on the Luga line. Feasible assistance also came from local residents. It was they who, in the first days, provided help with food and baked bread. Construction detachments were subjected to daily bombings; German pilots strafed unarmed builders with machine guns. In August, artillery shelling began. From bullets, bombs, and shells, people took cover in the trenches and dugouts they had just excavated. As soon as the planes flew away, construction work resumed.

Every day, new collectives and detachments from various organizations in the city and oblast began work on the extended front lines. People traveled by trains and trucks, marched in large columns. Most often in this human stream, the faces of cheerful, indefatigable guys and girls flashed... they did not return to the city as soon as they thought. Moreover, not by trucks, but on foot. And far from all returned. Along the way, they sometimes left graves of comrades who perished from bombings and machine-gun fire from planes...

Total number of defensive structures (Note: As of 11 August 1941, including structures built on the main defensive belt and on cut-off positions.)
firing points of all types	699 units
anti-tank obstacles	398 km
obstacles	14,739 units
abatis	67 km

A practice developed whereby the construction of the first line of defense was carried out by military personnel, while the second and subsequent lines were built by mobilized workers, employees, students, and senior school pupils. By mid-July, over 200,000 people were digging trenches, communication trenches, rifle and machine-gun foxholes, anti-tank ditches, building bunkers, pillboxes, command posts, observation and medical points, arranging forest abatis and anti-tank obstacles.

The main organizational form for sending Leningrad residents "to the trenches" became "echelons." They were formed by enterprises or groups of factories, plants, artels, and workshops. Their leaders bore primary responsibility for equipping people, organizing labor, and providing tools and special clothing. At the head of the echelon were its chief and commissar. Upon arrival at the destination, echelon leaders received specific tasks from military command for erecting the corresponding fortification. In turn, echelons were divided into hundreds, brigades, and links. Each worker was assigned a daily output norm. For earthworks, it was 3 m^{3}.

They lived in houses, baths, haylofts, attics. Worked 10 hours... In the evening, they washed in the river and, though tired, read the operational summary, newspapers. Discussed the present and future—victory is ours anyway, but how many people will perish, and some already have lost sons and husbands... Went to bed late, talked long about Leningrad.

On the Luga line, a special detachment was created, consisting of volunteers — physically strong, experienced military builders. It was intended for the rapid erection of firing structures in areas of the construction zone exposed to enemy fire. To at least somewhat protect themselves from shrapnel and bullets, metal shields had to be set up and temporary log piles created. Command transferred the detachment from one sector to another. Practically no assignment was completed without losses. For heroic actions, six builders were awarded the Order of the Red Star, and the remaining members of the detachment—combat medals.

From 28 July, the daily newspaper Leningradskaya Pravda at the Defensive Construction began publication, covering the life of builders of defensive lines and disseminating valuable experience from individual brigades and sites.

=== Forefield ===
In addition to constructing the defensive line, engineering units and subunits operated in mobile barrier detachments, which were created by the command of the Northern Front to gain time for preparing defenses on the Luga line and were directed mainly along the Luga–Pskov highway (now Pskov R23 highway). In the Gdov direction, on 25–27 June, barrier detachments from the 191st Rifle Division began work. On the line of the Plyussa River, mining of the forefield of the Luga position began by sappers of the 106th Separate Motorized Engineering Battalion, cadets of the Leningrad Engineering School, and pontooners of the 42nd Pontoon-Bridge Battalion. Since troops had not yet arrived in the forefield by this time, mining, destruction of roads, and structures was carried out without regard to specific troop requirements or linkage to upcoming combat actions.

== Forces of the sides ==
=== Army Group North ===
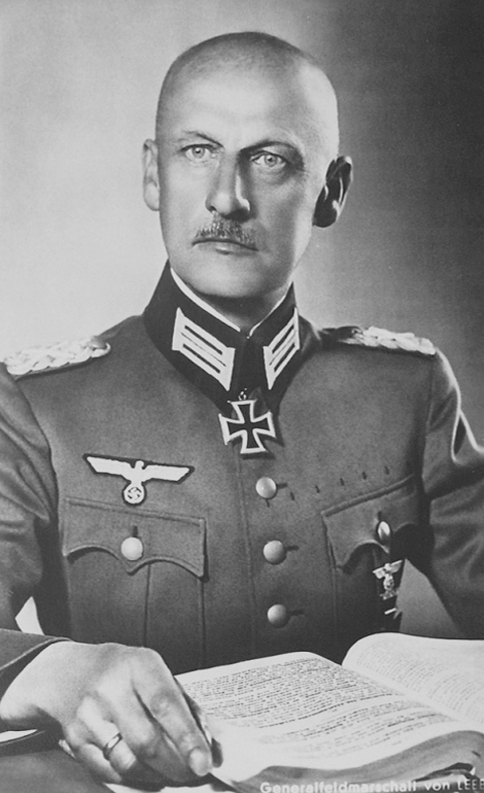
Wilhelm Ritter von Leeb, field marshal, commander of Army Group North

Order of battle of Army Group North as of 1 July 1941

As of 22 June, Army Group North, opposing the Baltic Military District, consisted of three armies:

- the 16th Army under Colonel General Busch;
- the 18th Army under Colonel General von Küchler;
- the 4th Panzer Group under Colonel General Hoepner.

29 divisions, including 20 infantry, 3 panzer, 3 motorized, and 3 security divisions; air support was provided by Germany's 1st Air Fleet under Colonel General Keller, which had 430 combat aircraft, including 270 bombers and 110 fighters. It included: the 1st Air Corps (the 1st, 76th and 77th bomber wings, equipped with Ju 87, Ju 88, He 111 aircraft); the 54th Fighter Wing (Bf 109, Bf 110); a group from the 53rd Fighter Wing; two reconnaissance squadrons (50 aircraft). To reinforce Army Group North, additional forces were allocated from the Wehrmacht High Command reserve, including: 5 batteries of self-propelled artillery; 6 gun battalions of 105 mm guns; 2 gun battalions of 150 mm guns; 11 battalions of heavy field howitzers; 2 mixed artillery battalions; 4 mortar battalions of 210 mm guns; 7 anti-aircraft batteries; 2 railway batteries; 3 armoured trains and other units and subunits. In total, Army Group North had: 655,000 personnel, 7,673 guns and mortars, 679 tanks and assault guns, 430 combat aircraft.

The level of training of the German troops was very high. The staffs of army groups, as well as divisions and corps, had good operational training and were fully prepared to command units during the planned combat operations. (Note: "The vastness of the space where our troops will advance is impressive. The possibility of maintaining flank contact here disappears by itself. Instead, the unity of combat actions of divisions acquires great importance. Here, all the work that we have invested for decades in training the divisional command level should pay off. The artillery preparation at the beginning of the offensive will not be calculated for complete suppression, but should be sufficient. In terms of engineering and communications support, it seems everything is well prepared". (Halder 2010, p. 44)) The command of Army Group North, the 16th and 18th field armies, the 4th Panzer Group, corps, and divisions had extensive combat experience gained on the battlefields of the First World War and in operations in Western European countries.

According to German command data, over three weeks of fighting, the total losses of the three formations amounted to about 30,000 personnel. Equipment losses were somewhat lower, at about 5%. Thus, by mid-July, the Wehrmacht managed to preserve the core of its combat subunits with which it had entered the war against the USSR.

Losses of Army Group North by mid-July 1941
	Killed	Wounded	Missing
16th Field Army	1,595	6,378	287
18th Field Army	2,278	6,079	719
4th Panzer Group	2,532	8,732	505
Total:	6,405	21,189	1,511

Believing that the 8th Army troops had withdrawn to Estonia were finally defeated and demoralized, the German command allocated only 2 infantry divisions (the 61st and 217th) from the 18th Army of von Küchler for the capture of Tallinn. However, the German command's calculations for quickly breaking Soviet resistance did not materialize. It lacked sufficient forces for the rapid capture of Tallinn — the main naval base of the Red Banner Baltic Fleet. In the battles, German units suffered heavy losses, and their strength continuously dwindled. For example, according to prisoner testimonies, companies in the 217th Infantry Division had only 15–20 men left by mid-July. As a result, the German command was forced to urgently transfer another 3 infantry divisions to this line, which had been intended for operations on the main Leningrad direction. On 30 July 1941, Hitler signed OKW Directive No. 34, in which Army Group North was ordered to continue the offensive on Leningrad, encircle it, and establish contact with the Finnish army. Army Group Center was to go on the defensive. The above tasks for Army Group North were confirmed in the "supplements to Directive No. 34 of 12 August 1941". Thus, the new element was that, alongside the direct offensive on Leningrad, Army Group North troops were to encircle the city from the southeast and east, occupying the passage between Lake Ilmen and Ladoga. To accomplish the latter task, in August, the XXXIX Panzer Corps of Colonel General Schmidt was transferred from Army Group Center to the 16th Army.

=== Luga Operational Group ===
The opponent of Army Group North was the troops of the northwestern direction under K. E. Voroshilov, united on the direction of the impending German offensive by the commands of the Northern Front under Lieutenant General M. M. Popov and the Northwestern Front under Major General P. P. Sobennikov. Initially, the Northern Front was intended to command troops operating in the Arctic and in Karelia. However, the development of the situation at the front forced the command to involve the Northern Front in the defense of Leningrad from the southwest, and also to begin transferring from the Karelian Isthmus to the Luga direction the 10th Mechanized Corps (without the 198th Motorized Division), the 237th and 70th Rifle Divisions. However, by Directive of the Stavka No. 00260 of 9 July 1941, the commander of the Northern Front was ordered to immediately transfer to the subordination of the commander of the Northwestern Front the 70th, 177th rifle divisions (Note: Although the Stavka Directive No. 00260 mentioned the transfer including the 177th Division, the 237th Rifle Division was transferred to the Northwestern Front. (Bychevsky 1967, p. 28)) and one tank division (from the 10th Mechanized Corps), which on 14 July were to deliver a counterattack against Manstein's 56th Mechanized Corps advancing toward Novgorod. As a result, from the 10th Mechanized Corps, only the 24th Tank Division operated on the Luga line, which as of 10 July had 118 BT-2 and BT-5 tanks, 44 BA-10 and BA-20 armored cars; only on 13 July did 3 KV tanks appear in the 24th Tank Division. (Note: How this happened is evident from a document dated 13 July, sent to the chief of staff of the Northern Front, copy to the chief of the ABTU of the Northern Front: "In the Nikolaevo area, in interaction with rifle units of the 41st Rifle Corps, 3 KV tanks are operating. No one knows which unit these tanks belong to. These three tanks are commanded by Lieutenant Kaitukov. Since the beginning of the war, these tanks have been participating in battles, having worked 60 hours without inspection of the material part. The tanks need an owner and repair. Therefore, I decided to subordinate the 3 KV tanks with crew (under the command of Lieutenant Kaitukov) to myself and ask you to approve my decision. To bring them in order, I ask to send a brigade from the Kirov Factory to the area of the 24th Tank Division for repair. The tanks were refueled on 12 July 1941 with specially sent fuel for this purpose. Commander of the 10th Mech Corps Major General Lazarev". (Khomyakov 2006))

On 5 July, to manage the fleet's preparation for the defense of the city, the Headquarters of the Naval Defense of Leningrad and the Lake Region was formed, commanded by Rear Admiral F. I. Chelpakov. The formation began of the Onega, Chudskaya, Ilmen, and Ladoga military flotillas, marine infantry brigades, sailor detachments, and the construction of additional coastal batteries. In addition, on 6 July, the Northern Front advanced to the southwest of Leningrad:

- the 191st Rifle Division, which deployed along the eastern bank of the Narva River;
- the 177th Rifle Division, which took up defense in the area of the city of Luga;
- the Leningrad Infantry School named after S. M. Kirov (2,000 personnel), which occupied Kingisepp;
- the Leningrad Machine Gun School (1,900 personnel), which concentrated in the city of Narva;
- the 1st Separate Mountain Rifle Brigade (5,800 personnel), mobilized in Leningrad and also sent near Luga.
- in Leningrad, starting from 29 June 1941, 3 divisions of the people's militia were being formed, each with 10,000 personnel.

To command the troops on the Luga line, by Order No. 26 of 6 July 1941, the staff of the Northern Front formed the Luga Operational Group (LOG), which was tasked with preventing the enemy from breaking through to the northeast in the direction of Leningrad. Command of the group was entrusted to Lieutenant General Konstantin Pavlovich Pyadyshev.

== Combat operations ==
Map of the battles on the Luga defensive line

On 9 July, after the capture of Pskov, the tank and motorized units of German forces did not wait for the approach of the main forces of the 16th and 18th Armies but resumed the offensive: the 41st Motorized Corps under General Reinhardt towards Luga, and the 56th Motorized Corps under General Manstein towards Novgorod. (Note: As at the beginning of the offensive from the German border, the panzer group again delivered its main blow with its left flank—the 41st Panzer Corps —while the 56th Panzer Corps was to begin its deep enveloping maneuver towards Chudovo with only two divisions— one panzer and one motorized. It was deprived of the opportunity to cover, as necessary, its open southern flank by placing the SS "Totenkopf" Division there in echelon to the right. Erich von Manstein. (von Manstein 1999, p. 203)) The defense on the Luga position was occupied by the 191st and 177th Rifle Divisions, the 1st People's Militia Division, the 1st Separate Mountain Rifle Brigade, cadets from the Leningrad Red Banner Infantry School named after S. M. Kirov, and the Leningrad Machine Gun School. In reserve was the 24th Tank Division, while the 2nd People's Militia Division was advancing towards the front line. The formations and units defended on a broad front. There were gaps of 20–25 km between them, unoccupied by troops. Some important directions, such as the Kingisepp direction, remained uncovered. The 106th Engineering and 42nd Pontoon Battalions established anti-tank minefields in the forefield zone. Intensive work was still ongoing on the Luga position; the construction of the line was far from complete. Tens of thousands of Leningrad residents and local population participated in the works.

=== Attempt to take Luga immediately ===
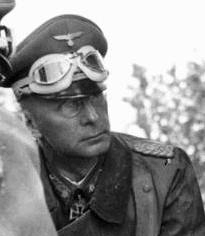
Georg-Hans Reinhardt, general, commander of the 41st Motorized Corps

On 10 July, two panzer, one motorized, and one infantry division of the XXXXI Motorized Corps, supported by aviation, struck north of Pskov against units of the 118th Rifle Division. Forcing it to withdraw towards Gdov, they rushed towards Luga. The 90th and 111th Rifle Divisions retreated under the pressure of superior enemy forces while fighting. A day later, the Germans reached the Plyussa River near the settlement of the same name and engaged in battle with the covering troops of the Luga Operational Group. By this time, the 177th Rifle Division under Colonel A. F. Mashoshin had managed to occupy the line in the Luga area and in the forefield. The German divisions encountered stubborn resistance. Important settlements and resistance nodes changed hands several times. On 13 July, the enemy managed to wedge into the covering zone, but in the morning of the next day, advanced detachments of the 177th Rifle Division and units of the 24th Tank Division, supported by powerful artillery fire, drove it out of the forefield and reoccupied positions along the Plyussa River. A major role in repelling the enemy's tank onslaught was played by the artillery group of Colonel G. F. Odintsov. One howitzer battery under Senior Lieutenant A. V. Yakovlev destroyed 10 enemy tanks. German forces on the Luga direction were halted.

On 13 July, the High Command of the Northwestern Direction decided to reorganize troop command on the southwestern approaches to Leningrad. The 8th Army and the 41st Rifle Corps of the 11th Army from the Northwestern Front were transferred to the Northern Front and tasked with preventing the enemy from breaking through to Leningrad. This decision reflected the actual situation, as the 8th Army and 41st Rifle Corps were already fighting in the Northern Front's zone. The Northern Front commander included the 41st Rifle Corps (111th, 90th, 235th, and 118th Rifle Divisions) in the Luga Operational Group. The remnants of the 41st Rifle Corps units were collected, provided with clothing and armament, consolidated into formations, and sent to reinforce the Luga Operational Group's troops; the 111th Rifle Division occupied the defense zone on the right, and the 235th Rifle Division on the left flank of the 177th Rifle Division.

=== Capture of bridgeheads near the village of Ivanovskoye and Bolshoy Sabsk ===
Directions of the main strikes of the 4th Panzer Group from 10 to 14 July 1941

When the general of the Panzer Troops G. Reinhardt tried to move his tanks and armored personnel carrier battalions away from the Pskov–Luga road in an enveloping maneuver, aiming to strike the defending Soviet units from the rear, he encountered the fact that the terrain to the right and left of the highway was practically unsuitable for armored vehicles. Large-scale operations became impossible. Tanks lost their main advantage — speed and maneuverability. At the same time, ground and air reconnaissance of the 4th Panzer Group established that on the left flank, in the lower reaches of the Luga River, rather insignificant Soviet forces were located. The commander of the 4th Panzer Group, Colonel General Hoepner, turned the 1st and 6th Panzer Divisions northward, leaving the 269th Infantry Division on the Luga direction. On 14 July, after a forced march of about 160 kilometers, the 6th Panzer Division, with the help of a special subunit from the Brandenburg Regiment, captured two undamaged bridges over the Luga near the village of Ivanovskoye.

The maneuver of the main forces of the 4th Panzer Group from the Luga to the Kingisepp direction was timely detected by Northern Front reconnaissance. Particularly distinguished was the reconnaissance group of V. D. Lebedev, operating in the enemy rear. It reported intense movement of German tanks and motorized columns from Strugi Krasnye and Plyussa towards Lady and further to the Luga River. Aerial reconnaissance also monitored the regrouping of German troops. The front command took urgent measures to cover the Kingisepp sector. The dispatch of the 2nd People's Militia Division, formed from volunteers of Leningrad's Moskovsky District, and a tank battalion from the Leningrad Red Banner Armored Courses (LBTKUKS) was accelerated to this direction. The arriving 2nd DNO attacked the enemy but failed to dislodge it from the bridgehead. Popov and Voroshilov personally arrived at the breakthrough site to observe the militia and tankers' attack. In the heat of battle, Popov, to better assess the situation, went on reconnaissance in a T-34 tank himself; the tank received three hits from armor-piercing shells in the turret, but the armor held, and the tank emerged from battle unharmed. On the same day, 14 July, a reinforced motorized battalion from the 1st Panzer Division reached the Luga River near Bolshoy Sabsk, and by 22:00 created a bridgehead on the eastern bank.

For several days, until 17 July, fierce fighting continued between a detachment of cadets from the Leningrad Infantry School named after S. M. Kirov and units of the enemy's 1st Panzer Division. Thanks to a timely prepared system of zigzag trenches at full height, the cadets held firm. Significant assistance to the defending troops was provided by coastal batteries, which destroyed concentrations of German infantry with their fire, disrupted crossings, and struck tank and mechanized units and artillery batteries. Subsequently, General Reinhardt, leaving screening forces near Bolshoy Sabsk, began concentrating the forces of the 41st Motorized Corps on the bridgehead near the village of Ivanovskoye to break through to the Kingisepp–Krasnoye Selo highway and thence to Leningrad.

=== Soviet counterattack near Soltsy ===
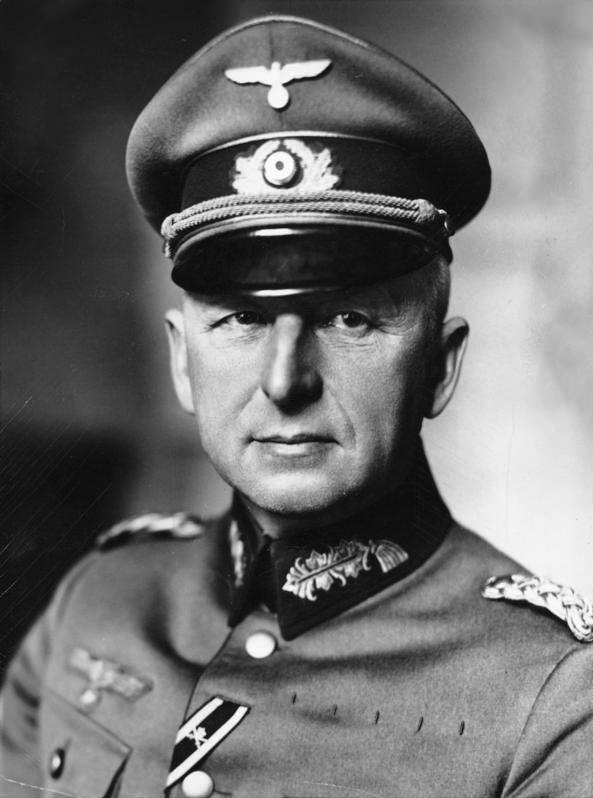
Erich von Manstein: general, commander of the 56th Motorized Corps

To defeat the units of the LVI Motorized Corps that had broken through to the area southwest of Shimsk, the commander of the Northwestern Front, by Directive No. 012 of 13 July 1941, ordered the troops of the 11th Army under General V. I. Morozov to deliver a counterattack and restore the situation in the area of the city of Soltsy. On 14 July, part of the Northwestern Front's formations (including three divisions transferred from the Northern Front) launched a counterattack against General Manstein's 56th Motorized Corps from the north. From the south, units of the 183rd Rifle Division of the 27th Army advanced towards Sitnya. The attacking formations were supported from the air by four aviation divisions of the Northwestern and Northern Fronts. The plan of the 11th Army commander was to encircle the enemy troops by strikes in converging directions against their flank and rear, cut them apart, and destroy them. In four days of fighting, the 8th Panzer Division was defeated, although it managed to break out of encirclement, but restoring its combat capability required a whole month. Units of the 56th Motorized Corps were thrown back 40 km westward. (Note: In the situation that developed, there was nothing left but to withdraw the 8th Panzer Division through Soltsy to escape the threatening pincers. The 3rd Motorized Division also had to temporarily disengage from the enemy so that the corps could regain freedom of action. The following several days were critical, and the enemy tried with all forces to preserve the encirclement ring. For this purpose, in addition to rifle divisions, it committed two panzer divisions, large artillery forces, and aviation. Despite this, the 8th Panzer Division managed to break through Soltsy westward and reunite its forces. However, its supply was provided by air for some time. The 3rd Motorized Division managed to disengage from the enemy only after repelling 17 attacks. Meanwhile, our communications were also cleared of the enemy after the army group command again subordinated the SS "Totenkopf" Division to the corps. By 18 July, the crisis could be considered overcome. Erich von Manstein. (von Manstein 1999, p. 205)) The corps' rear services suffered heavy losses. The German command, alarmed by the Soviet counterattack, ordered on 19 July to halt the offensive on Leningrad and resume it only after the main forces of the 18th Army approached Luga. The 11th Army's counterattack of the Northwestern Front temporarily eliminated the threat of a German breakthrough to Novgorod. However, Soviet troops also suffered heavy losses and switched to defense on 19 July, and by 27 July, retreated with fighting to the prepared positions of the Luga line. But the local victory had a downside. By throwing fresh formations into battle, Marshal K. E. Voroshilov simultaneously deprived himself of his only combat-ready reserve.

=== Organization and combat actions in late July–early August ===
On 21 July 1941, Lieutenant General K. P. Pyadyshev was presented with an arrest warrant. It stated that he was suspected of criminal activity under Article 58-10, Part 1 of the Criminal Code of the RSFSR. On 17 September, he was sentenced to 10 years' deprivation of liberty. He was found guilty of:

in 1937, among his acquaintances, and in 1940 in letters to his wife, making anti-Soviet statements directed against certain measures of the All-Union Communist Party (Bolsheviks) and the Soviet government.

Pyadyshev did not plead guilty. The Luga Operational Group, gradually reinforced with troops, was divided by Operational Directive No. 3049 of the Northern Front headquarters dated 23 July 1941 into the Kingisepp, Luga, and Eastern sectors (from 29 July—areas) of defense; the Luga Operational Group headquarters was disbanded, and its officers and generals were sent to staff the sector headquarters, with direct subordination to the Northern Front headquarters.

Order of battle of the Luga Operational Group as of 23 July 1941
Defense sector	Commander	Units
Kingisepp	V. V. Semashko	90th RD, 118th RD, 191st RD, 2nd and 4th DNO, 1st TD, Leningrad Infantry School, units of the Baltic Fleet coastal defense
Luga	A. N. Astanin	111th RD, 177th RD, 235th RD, 24th TD
Eastern	F. N. Starikov	70th RD, 237th RD, 128th RD, 21st TD, 1st DNO, 1st Mountain Rifle Brigade

On 31 July, the Eastern sector was transformed into the Novgorod Army Operational Group, which in early August was subordinated to the Northwestern Front. By Directive of the General Staff dated 4 August, the Novgorod Army Operational Group was transformed into the 48th Army, headed by Lieutenant General S. D. Akimov. To prevent the possibility of an assault bypassing the defensive positions, on 28 July, the Ilmen Flotilla was created on Lake Ilmen from vessels of river shipping. Commander—Captain 3rd Rank V. M. Drevnitsky. By Order No. 0278 of the front commander, the flotilla was subordinated to the 48th Army. Its ships performed patrol duty to prevent enemy breakthrough in the Novgorod and Staraya Russa directions and participated in tactical landings. From 14 August, the flotilla covered the withdrawal of troops and evacuation of the population from Novgorod with artillery fire, and then operated on the Volkhov River. The successful defensive battles in July 1941 in the Solt sy and Shimsk directions instilled some optimism in the command of the Northwestern Direction. A counterattack into the flank of the advancing Army Group North was being prepared near Staraya Russa, while the entrenched units on the Luga defensive line were to firmly hold their positions and prevent further advance of Nazi troops towards Leningrad. Despite significant reinforcement of the Luga line with rifle and tank subunits, the density of Soviet troops remained quite low. For example, the 177th Rifle Division of the Luga sector, covering the most important direction towards the city of Luga and facing three enemy divisions, defended on a 22 km front. The 111th Rifle Division of the same sector defended an identical front. Even difficult terrain did not compensate for the stretched deployment of troops and their single-echelon arrangement. In late July, a document summarizing the experience of the first month of the war, including characterizing German troop actions, was prepared at the headquarters of the 24th Tank Division:

1. The enemy conducts combat operations mainly during the day.
2. Motorized-mechanized units are located primarily in populated areas.
3. The enemy conducts constant air reconnaissance.
4. Upon an unsuccessful attempt to attack on the move, immediately switches to artillery and mortar preparation on a narrow sector, trying to seize the road or withdraws to search for weak points.
5. Where there is resistance, the enemy does not go.
6. Does not secure rear areas.
7. Has no continuous front, but groups by directions.
8. If a tank is knocked out, immediately launches a counterattack to capture it.
9. The enemy advances boldly (soldiers drunk) until there is organized fire and determination.
10. Tries to morally influence troops by penetrating deep into the rear along roads.
11. Enemy aviation mainly bombs roads and bridges, using bombs from 5 to 500 kg.
12. There is a significant shortage of bread; German bread is baked from surrogates; soldiers rob the population.
13. Upon withdrawal, immediately mines roads and adjacent terrain.

The outcome of the Soviet troops' fighting in July on the Leningrad direction was greatly influenced by the Smolensk defensive operation of the Western Front troops. By halting Smolensk Army Group Center east in late July, the Western Front troops deprived the enemy of the opportunity to carry out the planned strike by the 3rd Panzer Group from the area north of Smolensk against the flank and rear of the Northwestern Front troops. Both sides sought to maximize the use of the unexpectedly formed pause. While the Germans developed a plan to resume the offensive on Leningrad, Soviet command strengthened the city's defense. Of course, both in Hitler's headquarters and in the headquarters of Army Group North, it was understood that the sooner their troops resumed the offensive, the less time the Russians would have to strengthen their defense. Nevertheless, the start dates for the offensive were postponed six times, mainly due to supply difficulties, regroupings, and disagreements over further actions. By 8 August, the German command carried out a regrouping of its troops and created three strike groups:

Order of battle of Army Group North as of 8 August 1941
Strike group	Commander	Units	Direction of strike
Northern («North»)	Erich Hoepner	XLI Motorized Corps (1st, 6th, and 8th Panzer Divisions, 36th Motorized Division, 1st Infantry Division) XXXVIII Army Corps (58th Infantry Division) I Air Corps	from the Ivanovskoye and Sabsk bridgeheads through the Koporye Plateau towards Leningrad
Central («Luga»)	Erich von Manstein	LVI Motorized Corps (3rd Motorized Division, 269th Infantry Division, SS Police Infantry Division)	along the Luga–Leningrad highway towards Leningrad
Southern («Shimsk»)	Ernst Busch	I Army Corps (11th, 21st Infantry Divisions and part of the 126th Infantry Division) XXVIII Army Corps (121st, 122nd Infantry Divisions, SS "Totenkopf" Motorized Division, and 96th Infantry Division in reserve) VIII Air Corps	in the Novgorod-Chudovo direction, to bypass Leningrad from the east and link up with Finnish troops

By early August, Army Group North had lost 42,000 personnel but received only 14,000 replacements. As early as mid-July, the Army Group North command concluded that enemy resistance and insufficient own forces would not allow seizing Leningrad on the march. This task could only be solved by sequentially defeating Russian forces. OKW Directive No. 33 of 19 July stated:

Resume the advance towards Leningrad only after the 18th Army makes contact with the 4th Panzer Group and its eastern flank is secured by the 16th Army forces.

The 16th Army could cover the right flank of the 4th Panzer Group only after completing the defeat of encircled Soviet formations near Nevel or pushing them eastward. In the opinion of Field Marshal von Leeb, the offensive should be postponed until 25 July. This did not suit Hitler at all, who sought to finish with Leningrad as soon as possible, and on 21 July the Führer flew to Leeb's headquarters; the German general presented his considerations to Hitler: until sufficient infantry forces arrived, Hoepner's panzer group could hardly count on success. Ultimately, the German command decided to breach the Soviet defense on the flanks, leaving minimal forces on the Luga direction to pin down Soviet troops. The main idea of the German offensive on Leningrad was to encircle and destroy its defenders on the distant approaches to the city. By cutting off the Luga group of Soviet troops from the fortifications directly under Leningrad, Army Group North opened the possibility of unhindered advance both on Leningrad itself and bypassing the city to link up with the Finnish army on the Svir.

=== Breakthrough of the line near Kingisepp ===
Fortification structures. Kingisepp fortified district (No. 21).

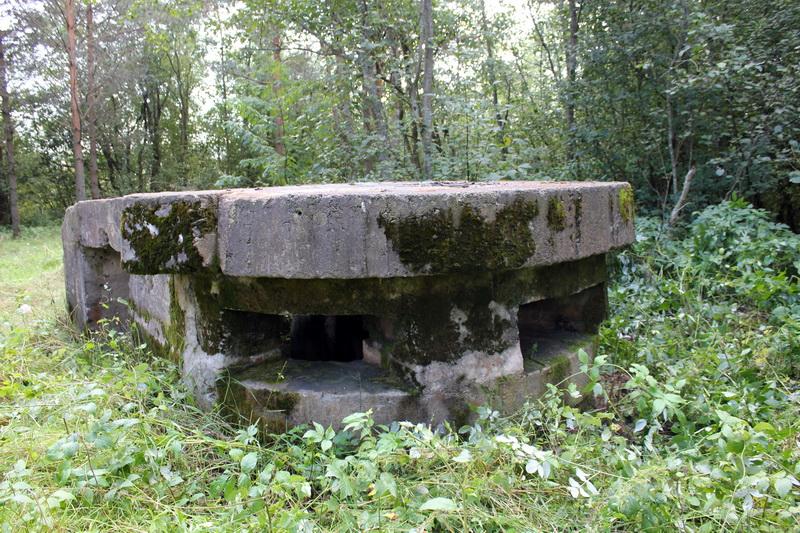
"ЖБОТ № 1" [Reinforced Concrete Machine Gun Bunker No. 1].
59°22′9″N 28°34′34″E

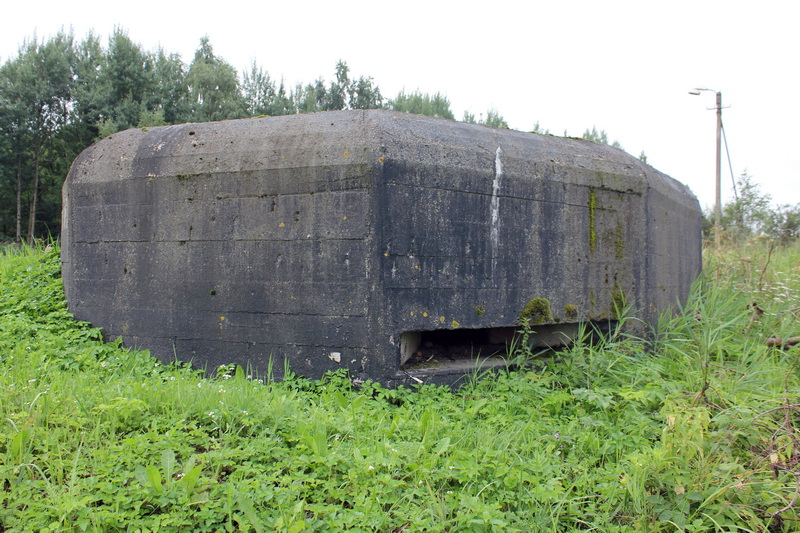
"ДОТ № 26" [Pillbox No. 26].
59°23′4″N 28°28′46″E

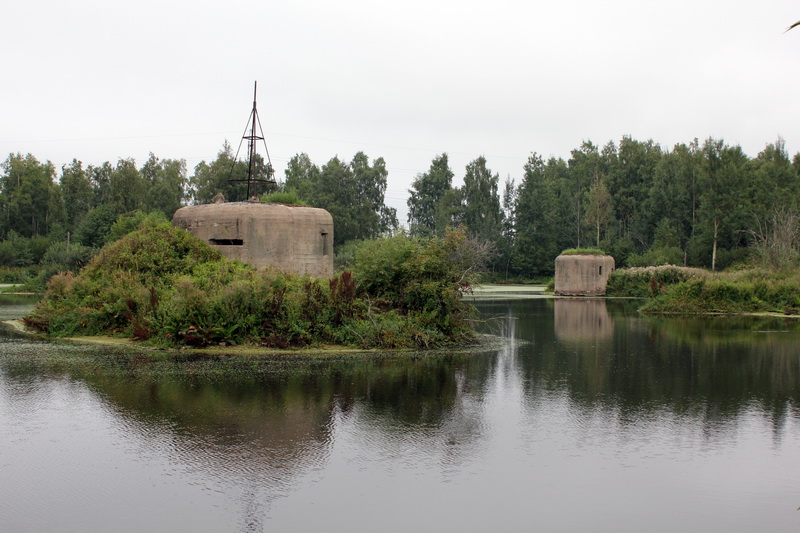
"ДОТ № 20" [Pillbox No. 20].
59°24′51″N 28°28′2″E

The northern group under General Erich Hoepner can be conditionally called "panzer," as all the panzer divisions of Army Group North were concentrated here. These divisions were to "open" the bridgeheads on the Luga River, using primarily their strike rather than maneuver qualities. The timing of Army Group North's transition to the offensive was postponed five times from 22 July to 6 August due to transport problems in the 16th Army. When the last appointed date arrived—8 August 1941—the weather deteriorated, rain poured, and no aircraft could take off. German troops were deprived of the planned powerful air support. However, Hoepner vigorously opposed further postponement of the operation start, and the 4th Panzer Group's offensive from the bridgeheads on the Luga River near the village of Ivanovskoye and Bolshoy Sabsk began without air support. (Note: Considering the weather conditions, the offensive on Shimsk had to be postponed. Notable is the offensive by units of the left flank (Erich Hoepner's 4th Panzer Group) in the Narva area. The offensive on Shimsk, if weather permits, is planned for tomorrow. Franz Halder. (Halder 2010, p. 278)) The attack encountered strong resistance from Soviet troops supported by artillery. For three days, units of the 90th Rifle Division, subunits of the 2nd People's Militia Division, and remnants of the Leningrad Infantry School cadets' detachment held back the onslaught of Hoepner's 4th Panzer Group. Count Johann Adolf von Kielmansegg—chief of the operations department of the 6th Panzer Division headquarters—named the following reasons for the unsuccessful offensive:

1. The strength of the newly equipped Russian positions, the scale of which was unexpected and unknown to us, with their main area in the division's offensive zone. Several anti-tank ditches, obstacles of all kinds, countless mines, bunkers of thick logs or concrete, often armed with small-caliber automatic guns, connected by barbed wire, turned this line in the swampy forest into a fortified position like the so-called "Stalin Line." These positions were nevertheless created since the beginning of the war, as local residents later told us.
2. The enemy fully realized the significance of this battle. The division faced troops partly composed of Leningrad civilians who compensated for insufficient training with even greater ferocity.
3. The reason for the tactical failure of the division's offensive on 8 August should be sought primarily in the fact that, as subsequently established, the enemy intended to launch a powerful offensive in the division's sector in the afternoon hours of that very day. On the night of 7–8 August, the enemy was specially reinforced with artillery and infantry and undertook a regrouping, which the division command could not yet learn about on the morning of 8 August. Therefore, the division's combat employment no longer fully corresponded to the situation. The main strike met the main strike. The shock from the repulse and considerable losses was palpable.

Map of the breakthrough of the Luga defensive line 8 August 1941 – 19 August 1941

The offensive was repeated on 11 August; by 11:00, in terrain covered with forest and spruce, German troops managed to find a weak spot in the Soviet defense, through which tanks then broke through. Under strong pressure from superior enemy forces, the defenders of this sector of the Kingisepp area began withdrawing eastward and northward. After the breakthrough in depth, the 1st and 6th Panzer Divisions turned eastward to form the inner front of encirclement of Soviet troops near Luga, while the 1st Infantry and 36th Motorized Divisions formed the outer front. Three days of fighting cost the attackers 1,600 killed. The 8th Panzer Division was also committed from the Bolshoy Sabsk bridgehead. On 14 August, divisions of the XLI Motorized Corps overcame the forest massif and reached the Krasnogvardeysk–Kingisepp road. Thus, by the end of 14 August, the Luga line on the Kingisepp sector was breached—according to assessments of both sides. (Note: "The soldiers now understand that this war is no longer a blitzkrieg; it will drag on. The population is no longer friendly to them as before in the Baltics. They explain this by the fact that almost all villages have to be set on fire with artillery before they can be captured. Memories of the French campaign flood in, but that campaign seems completely incomparable to the soldiers. The Russians do not fall to their knees after the first heavy blows like the French; they continue to fight stubbornly and resolutely. They have seen many Russian soldiers who killed themselves with hand grenades rather than surrender". (Carell 2003, p. 131)) On 16 August, German units occupied Kingisepp and Narva; units of the XI Rifle Corps of the 8th Army abandoned Estonia and crossed to the right bank of the Narva River. Significant assistance to the defending troops was provided by the 11th, 12th, 18th, and 19th separate railway batteries of 180–356 mm caliber operating in this area. On 21 August, the 356 mm battery destroyed a German crossing over the Luga River near Porechye with its fire. On 22 August, German troops reached the firing range of coastal batteries, and they opened fire supporting the 8th Army troops. During the fierce battles for Kingisepp, the 8th Army lost all its regimental and battalion commanders as well as their staffs.

=== Battles near Luga ===
The front line on the approaches to the city of Luga resembled a horseshoe in shape — Soviet troops occupied a crescent-shaped salient with Luga in the center. The "Luga" group was the pinning center of the German offensive. Here, the 56th Motorized Corps (269th Infantry Division, SS "Police" Division, and 3rd Motorized Division) delivered a pinning strike, imitating a strike along the shortest distance to Leningrad and preventing Soviet command from withdrawing troops to aid adjacent defense sectors of the Luga line. Simultaneously, pinning in battle prevented the troops near Luga from quickly disengaging from the enemy and timely escaping the emerging encirclement. On 10 August, units of the SS "Police" Division and parts of the 269th Infantry Division began advancing west of the Pskov–Luga highway. The frontal offensive initially did not succeed and involved huge casualties; the SS division alone lost 2,000 killed and wounded. The commander of the SS "Police" Division, General Arthur Mülverstedt, seeking to morally support his subordinates in the sector of emerging success, appeared on the battlefield and was killed by a mortar mine explosion.

Availability of matériel in the 24th Tank Division as of 15 August 1941

On 11 August, SS units broke through to the settlement of Stoyanovshchina. Here they were met by counterattacks from tanks of the 24th Tank Division. Despite the presence of KV tanks among the attackers, the counterattack was repelled by the Germans. The Luga group of Soviet troops had only three KV tanks; there were too few for use as tank ambushes, as German units could simply bypass dug-in tanks from the rear. Positioning all three KV tanks on the front was impossible; unengaged gaps would remain between them anyway. Therefore, the only option was counterattacks, in which the KVs were either knocked out or bogged down. In the battles from 10 to 14 August, Soviet troops lost 2 KV tanks and 27 BT tanks.

After successfully consolidating positions near Stoyanovshchina, units of the SS "Police" struck towards the highway, into the rear of the subunits defending it. This rolled up the Soviet defense across the highway and widened the breakthrough. These battles continued until 19 August. But even after that, the Germans did not dare advance along the highway. On 23–24 August, German troops broke through between Lake Bolshoye Toloni and Cheremenetskoye (east of the highway) and reached the Luga River upstream from the city of Luga. This allowed attacking the city from the east and capturing it on 24 August. The SS claimed capturing 1,937 prisoners, destroying 53 tanks, 28 guns, 13 anti-tank guns; the sapper battalion of the SS "Police" Division removed or neutralized 6,790 mines of all types containing 46 tons of explosives. German sappers noted with annoyance that many Soviet mines had wooden casings, precluding detection by standard mine detectors.

=== Breakthrough of the line in the Novgorod area ===
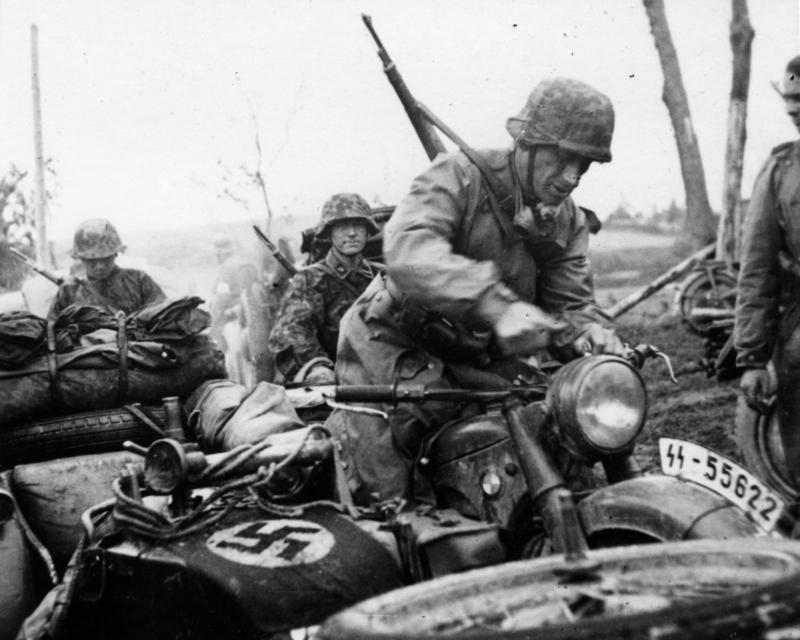
Soldiers of the SS "Totenkopf" Division

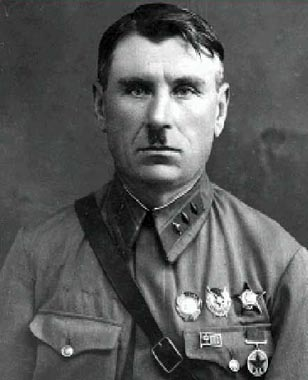
S. D. Akimov, lieutenant general, commander of the 48th Army

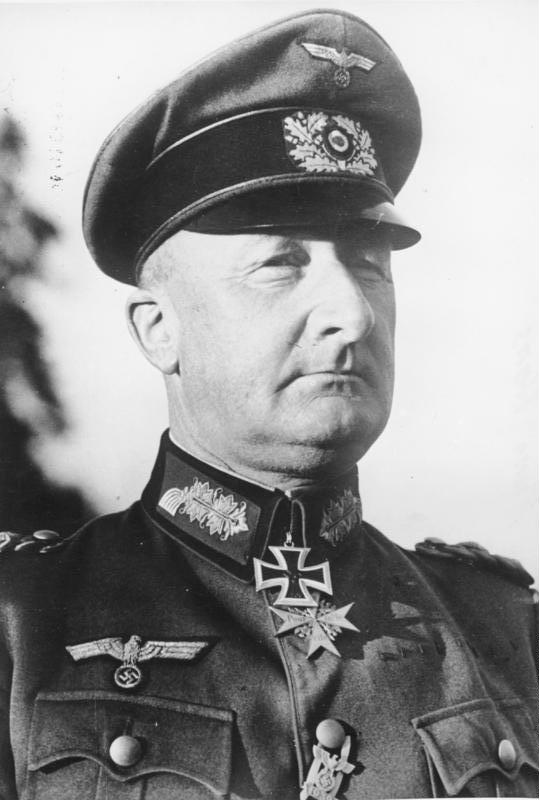
German: Kuno-Hans von Both, general, commander of the 1st Army Corps

The southern group of German troops under General Busch can be conditionally considered "infantry." Unfavorable terrain conditions did not allow the use of tanks in this direction, and the main strike was delivered by six infantry divisions. Air support was provided by Richthofen's 8th Air Corps, which had about 400 aircraft; in addition, the corps had a significant amount of anti-aircraft artillery actively used in ground battles. The Novgorod was to be attacked directly by the 1st Army Corps under General of Infantry Kuno-Hans von Both. The width of the corps' offensive front was only 16 km. The corps was reinforced with the 659th and 666th assault gun batteries and several heavy artillery battalions. Unlike Hoepner, the commander of the 16th Army, General Busch, decided not to forgo air support in the offensive on Novgorod. When the weather sharply deteriorated on the evening of 7 August, the offensive the next morning was canceled; units that had taken initial positions were withdrawn back. When the weather did not improve the next day, the start was postponed again.

Finally, on 10 August, the weather improved, and at 05:20, after air and artillery strikes, the infantry went on the offensive; as a result of the battles that day, the Germans practically fully uncovered the defense system of the 48th Army and identified its weak point—the positions of the mountain rifle brigade. The next morning, 11 August, fighting resumed. The Germans again delivered the main strike on the mountain rifle brigade's sector. Due to the lack of anti-aircraft means and air cover among Soviet troops, Richthofen's corps pilots unpunishedly destroyed equipment, machine-gunned defenders, and operated freely across the front. Wire communication was completely disrupted, command and control destroyed, and artillery positions wrecked. (Note: "...enemy aviation is continuously in the air, up to 100 aircraft, striking to operational depths of 30–35 km, bombing and machine-gunning with impunity, combing all forests and chasing every vehicle, causing significant losses in personnel and matériel. For the first time in the war, I see such massive aviation use. Our fighter aviation is not allowed beyond the army CP". (Mamonov 2011)) The Northwestern Front's aviation could not assist its infantry; aircraft made only 44 sorties in the day, with 4 bombers and 40 fighters.

The successes of the first day of the offensive on the Army Group North front are completely insignificant. On all front sectors where no offensive actions are conducted, troops are exhausted. What we are now undertaking is the last and at the same time dubious attempt to prevent a transition to positional warfare. The command has extremely limited means. The army groups are separated from each other by natural boundaries (swamps). Our last forces are thrown into battle.

The breakthrough of the 48th Army defense on the Novgorod direction was completed on 13 August. A decisive role that day was played by the fact that a detailed defense plan of the 128th Rifle Division fell into German hands. It marked minefields, dummy positions, artillery and machine-gun nests, main resistance nodes, and force distribution among defense sectors. Division commanders actively used their sappers to clear extensive minefields; sappers were followed by vanguards of advancing regiments. 88 mm anti-aircraft guns were used to destroy pillboxes. On 14 August, the commanders of the 70th and 237th Rifle Divisions, considering the current severe situation (semi-encirclement by the enemy, capture of transit roads, and lack of fuel, ammunition, food), decided to withdraw; in the night from 16 to 17 August, secretly, the divisions began withdrawing towards Leningrad. German reconnaissance detected the withdrawal routes. Pursuit began, primarily with air bombing and artillery fire. On 19 August, during artillery fire, the acting commander of the 237th Division, Colonel V. Ya. Tishinsky, was killed. The commander of the 70th Division, Major General A. E. Fedyunin, died of wounds (or, according to other data, shot himself) in encirclement on 21 August.

The 70th Division, emerging in small groups from encirclement, numbered 3,197 personnel on 25 August, and the 237th Division 2,259 on 29 August. In the morning of 15 August, the Germans attempted to seize Novgorod on the march, but it failed. Dive bombers of the 8th Air Corps descended on Novgorod. Later, in reports, the German command acknowledged the key role of aviation in the assault on Novgorod. The next day, the German flag flew over the Novgorod Kremlin. However, the battle for the city did not end; remnants of Colonel I. D. Chernyakhovsky's 28th Tank Division and the 1st Mountain Rifle Brigade fought for its eastern part until 19 August. While battles for Novgorod continued, the 1st Army Corps advanced towards Chudovo. The 11th Infantry Division took defense on the Volkhov to protect the corps' right flank, while a battle group of the 21st Infantry Division captured Chudovo on 20 August, cutting the Oktyabrskaya Railway.

The next day, units of the 1st Army Corps repelled several Soviet counterattacks. The first task of the German offensive in this direction was accomplished. Thus, 20–22 August, the enemy with advanced units reached the near approaches to Leningrad and entered combat contact with units of the Krasnogvardeysk Fortified Region. After this, the 1st and 28th Corps of the 16th Army advance on Leningrad, while formations of the XXXIX Motorized Corps advance towards Ladoga to link up there with Finnish troops. Rapidly advancing along the Moscow–Leningrad highway, the enemy occupied the city of Lyuban on 25 August and reached the near approaches to Leningrad in the Slutsk–Kolpino area (26 kilometers from Leningrad) on 29 August. Thus, German troops approached the city from the direction least expected.

=== Soviet counterattack near Staraya Russa ===
In these days, the Stavka of the Supreme High Command, to assist the Northern Front troops, directively ordered the start of an offensive towards Morino (railway station on the Staraya Russa–Dno sector) by forces of the 34th Army allocated from the Stavka reserve and the left wing of the 11th Army. On 12 August, the indicated formations went on the offensive and threw the enemy back 40 kilometers. On 15 August, 3 German infantry divisions of the 10th Army Corps were encircled near Staraya Russa. To halt the Northwestern Front's offensive and eliminate the results of their advance, the Army Group North command urgently withdrew two motorized divisions from the Luga direction—the 3rd Motorized Division and the SS "Totenkopf" Motorized Division from the LVI Corps, as well as the 8th Air Corps, and transferred them to assist the 10th Army Corps of the 16th Army. At the same time, the 8th Panzer Division remained in the XLI Motorized Corps and participated in the offensive on the Kingisepp sector.

By the end of 20 August, the offensive was halted; the 34th Army was pinned along the entire front. By 25 August, the 34th and 11th Armies were pushed back to the Lovat River line. The offensive ended. The Germans claimed capturing 18,000 prisoners, capturing or destroying 20 tanks, 300 guns and mortars, 36 anti-aircraft guns, 700 vehicles. Here, the Germans first captured an RS launcher ("Katyusha"). Despite suffering heavy losses and eventually being thrown back to initial positions, the German command changed its assessment regarding Soviet troops south of Lake Ilmen. The 34th Army's counterattack played a crucial role in the initial phase of the battle for Leningrad. This strike drew mobile formations of the Wehrmacht panzer groups away from the Luga line. Both the "Luga" and "Shimsk" groups aimed at the Luga line were deprived of echelons for developing success in the form of motorized divisions. In the extremely tight timelines within which mobile formations could be used in Army Group North before their redeployment in September 1941 to the Moscow direction, even minimal delays turned quantity into quality. From this perspective, the role of the counterattack near Staraya Russa in the battle for Leningrad is hard to overestimate.

=== Luga troops encirclement ===
On 24 August, the troops of the Luga Operational Group (from 25 August the Southern Operational Group) under General A. N. Astanin received Combat Order No. 102 from the Northern Front headquarters: leaving covering forces on the Luga River, regroup, and destroy the German units that had broken through south of the Krasnogvardeysk Fortified Region. On the same day, Soviet troops abandoned the city of Luga. On 28 August, all supply routes were cut; the encircled units experienced acute shortages of ammunition, fuel, and food. In the "cauldron" were units of the 41st Rifle Corps: the 70th, 90th, 111th, 177th, and 235th Rifle Divisions, the 1st and 3rd DNO, the 24th Tank Division—about 43,000 personnel in total. There were many wounded in the troops: up to two thousand, including about 500 seriously wounded.

Astanin received the order: destroy or bury matériel, and troops to break out of encirclement in small groups along designated directions. This order was executed by Astanin. Attempts to break out northward were unsuccessful. On 30 August, the decision was made to split into several groups and break out to link up with Northern Front troops near Leningrad in the Kirishi and Pogostye areas. The detachments were led by formation commanders and temporary group leaders—General A. N. Astanin, Colonels: A. F. Mashoshin (commander of the 177th Rifle Division), A. G. Rodin (deputy commander of the 24th Tank Division, effectively leading the 1st DNO), S. V. Roginsky (commander of the 11th Rifle Division), and G. F. Odintsov. The units breaking out of the "cauldron" gradually joined the defenders of Leningrad. The front command attempted to organize air supply to the encircled group. According to the request from Astanin's group headquarters dated 4 September 1941, 10 tons of rusks, 3 tons of food concentrates, 20 tons of gasoline, 4 tons of diesel fuel, 1,600 76 mm and 400 122 mm shells, and some other items—salt, entrenching tools, etc.—were requested.

The drop was carried out on 5 September 1941 by six R-5 aircraft and one Douglas. However, it quickly became clear that the enemy was patrolling the encirclement area with fighters. Of seven aircraft, five did not return, including the Douglas. By 11 September, barely half of the requested was delivered: 5.3 tons of rusks, 1 ton of concentrates, 5.2 tons of gasoline, 2.2 tons of diesel fuel, 450 rounds of 76 mm caliber. 122 mm rounds were not delivered at all; beyond the request, medicines and entrenching tools were delivered. The capabilities of Soviet Air Forces for supplying "cauldrons" by air in 1941 were quite modest. From 8 September, Leningrad's connection with the mainland was cut, leaving only communication via Ladoga and by air. Transport aviation was engaged in supplying Leningrad itself; perhaps under different conditions, supplying Astanin's group would have been more effective.

The encircled Soviet troops continued intense fighting in forested-swampy terrain until September 1941; final abandonment of deblocking the "cauldron" occurred only on 14–15 September, when battles were already raging on the near approaches to Leningrad. The existence in the rear of Army Group North of a Soviet troop group negatively affected the German offensive on Leningrad. The troops fighting near Luga pinned significant enemy forces until 31 August, preventing German troops from using the shortest and most convenient communications—the railway and highway Pskov–Leningrad. (Note: It is gratifying that the entire Luga–Krasnogvardeysk highway section is now in our hands. This restores interaction between the 269th Infantry and 8th Panzer Divisions. Another important foundation for further operations is created, as the 50th Army Corps can soon be brought up, except for parts still needed to destroy the enemy near Luga. Now the 4th Panzer Group can be supplied via this highway and railway, not via the distant detour through swampy terrain near Lake Samro. Wilhelm von Leeb, 31 August 1941. (Lebedev 2005, p. 22)) Moreover, the Luga sector troops, occupying central positions south of Leningrad, divided enemy troops into three separate isolated groups, preventing the creation of a unified, continuous front. About 13,000 personnel managed to break out of the Luga "cauldron" to their own lines. According to published German data, 20,000 were captured. Most prisoners were taken by the Wehrmacht's 8th Panzer Division: 7,083 prisoners by 11 September (including 1,100 on 9 September) and 3,500 on 14 September. About 10,000 Soviet soldiers died in battles attempting to break out; small groups joined partisans or, after recovering from wounds, emerged much later. A large group from the 24th Tank Division is also known to have headed towards Moscow.

For Soviet prisoners of war, the Germans set up the transit-filtration Dulag-320 camp. It mainly held soldiers of the XLI Rifle Corps that defended the Luga defensive line. Among the prisoners, the Germans identified and shot command staff, political workers, rank-and-file communists, representatives of Soviet authority, Jews, Roma. According to eyewitnesses, the camp was fenced with barbed wire, with guard soldiers on watchtowers. In 1941, there were neither barracks nor even shelters. Prisoners sat directly on the ground, later on snow. Typhus and dysentery raged in the camp; up to two hundred died daily from disease and hunger. Later, other camps arose; prisoners held there were driven to build roads and clear ruins.

== Critics ==
The organization of the defense on the Luga Line had significant shortcomings: a single-echelon formation of troops in armies, operational groups, and fronts; weak reserves; insufficient troop density; even distribution of forces and assets along the entire front; and poor saturation of the defense with engineering structures. Naturally, such a defense could not withstand massive strikes by tank forces, and German troops managed to break through the Soviet defensive positions.

Errors of both tactical and technical nature were made during the construction of the Luga defensive line. Tactical errors included low density of firing structures, insufficient depth of echeloning, embrasures predominantly of frontal action, and insufficient camouflage of structures. Technical errors included insufficient wall thickness; dimensions of casemates that did not everywhere provide normal working conditions for the gun crew, lack of ventilation; lack of lighting; lack of communication and possibility of observation of the battlefield. All these errors made the defense system on a number of sectors unstable.

Numerous shortcomings existed at all levels and sectors from the first to the last day of work, starting from reconnaissance and ending with the installation of armament in firing points, moreover, the shortcomings present in the first days of work were noted even a month later; as a result, far from everything was built. Even the provision of information about the progress of work to higher headquarters was extremely poorly organized. The absence of a general developed tactical assignment caused contradictory requirements in military units for the construction of firing points. Sometimes the shortage of tools reached the point of absurdity—for example, on August 2 in the village of Glubokaya (Kingisepp sector), 2,500 workers had only 2 axes, but overall, the workers were provided with tools in sufficient quantity. There are known cases when instructions from Leningrad arrived for construction on territory already occupied by the enemy. Calculations relying on the use of the local population were not always justified, as sometimes the population was evacuated before the start of work. Due to the hot summer, many swampy areas dried up, and the line in these places required additional reinforcement, which was not provided for in the plans. Reconnaissance and planning of construction proceeded more slowly than the arrival at railway stations of prefabricated reinforced concrete and armored firing points and anti-tank obstacles.

This kind of firing points were mass-produced and used for the defense of the Luga Line; such a prefabricated design allowed for quickly equipping firing positions with them.

Some of the constructed structures were never used. For example, along the western bank of the Volkhov from Lake Ladoga to Gostinopolye, defensive structures were built facing east. It was impossible to use these structures for defense against an enemy advancing from the west; on the contrary, the enemy could use them upon reaching the Volkhov line, so they were destroyed by order of Major General A. M. Vasilevsky.

The directive of the Military Council of the North-Western Direction dated July 29, 1941, No. 013/op also stated that the positions of troops on the forward edge were not equipped with trenches of proper depth, dugouts, communication trenches, or wire obstacles. Artillery, mortar, and machine-gun positions were poorly chosen and camouflaged. Mine obstacles were random and ill-conceived. Issues of ensuring troop maneuver, both along the front and in the depth of their disposition, were not thought through.

Nevertheless, despite all the shortcomings, the fortifications of the Luga Line were highly assessed by the enemy. During the battles near Luga, German troops had to transition from an offensive march directly to fierce combat actions, which were influenced not only by the terrain features and weather conditions but also by the stubborn resistance of Soviet troops. German soldiers noted the skillful camouflage and mastery in using terrain features, as well as numerous and diverse fortifications. Believing that the Luga defensive structures had been built over many months, they were forced to employ all their skills, experience, and technical means to overcome them. (Note: "The nature of the combat employment of the engineer battalion was predetermined by the necessity of fighting with assault groups against bunkers of the most varied strength and size, with extensive use of flamethrowers, bundles of hand grenades, smoke screens, as well as with the removal of mines of all types, which were installed by the enemy to strengthen their positions on a scale previously unimaginable. The nature of the defensive structures and the method of their use convinced that these were pre-prepared over months and timely equipped defensive positions, the most important cornerstone in the outer ring of Leningrad's defense, on the most important railway line and main [motor] road to the north. The powerful artillery employment and the fact that this sector was occupied by elite troops further emphasized the great importance that the Soviets openly attached to the Luga positions". (Husemann 2002, p. 76))

The defense of Luga was also assessed by German fortification specialists. On September 23, 1941, the Inspector General of Engineer and Fortress Troops of the Wehrmacht Alfred Jacob reported to the Chief of the General Staff of the Army General Halder on "the Russian experience in accelerated construction of fortifications in the Luga area".

Information about Soviet fortifications and methods of combating them was disseminated in the German army; in early September, a document on the fortifications near Luga was issued to the troops. It examined in detail all types of defensive structures used on the Luga Line. Particular note was made of such an innovation as prefabricated pillboxes constructed from large concrete blocks, which allowed them to be erected in a short time.

== Results ==
From July 10, when the offensive in the Luga direction began, until August 24, when German troops captured Luga, 45 days had passed. Until July 10 —that is, before approaching the Luga defensive line— the average daily advance rate of the Germans was 26 kilometers per day; thereafter, it fell to 5 kilometers per day, and in August to 2.2 kilometers per day. The delay of German troops allowed the leadership of the Leningrad defense to solve a number of priority tasks:

1. Formation of new military units and their training. The 272nd and 281st rifle divisions and the 25th Cavalry Division were formed.
2. Since June 29, the creation of a mass people's militia was carried out. In a short time, 160,000 people in Leningrad volunteered for the people's militia. Ten divisions, 16 separate machine-gun artillery battalions, and 7 partisan regiments were formed. Some of the militiamen replenished the thinned ranks of units and formations. To carry out this complex and important work, the administration of the Leningrad People's Militia Army was created under the command of Major General A. I. Subbotin. Already in the second ten-day period of July, two people's militia divisions joined the ranks of the defenders of the Luga Line.
3. For the defense of Leningrad from the south, the formation of two new armies —the 42nd and 55th— was carried out. The headquarters of the 42nd Army was created by August 3 on the basis of the abolished 50th Rifle Corps of the 23rd Army. Major General V. I. Shcherbakov was appointed army commander. On the basis of the also abolished headquarters of the 10th Mechanized Corps, the headquarters of the Slutsk-Kolpino Operational Group was first created, which on September 2 was transformed into the headquarters of the 55th Army. Major General of Tank Troops I. G. Lazarev was appointed its commander.
4. Simultaneously with the improvement of the fortifications of the Luga Line, by decision of the Military Councils of the North-Western Direction and the Northern Front, defensive lines were built in the immediate vicinity of Leningrad. In July, construction of the Krasnogvardeysk fortified region began. For this, the population of Leningrad and the region was mobilized again—up to 500,000 people.
5. During the period from June 29 to August 27, 1941, 488,703 people were evacuated from Leningrad; in addition, during this period, the population of the Estonian, Latvian, Lithuanian, and Karelo-Finnish SSRs —147,500 people— was evacuated to Leningrad.

Overall, the protracted nature of the struggle for Leningrad, unexpected for the German command, had a significant influence on the entire further course of the Great Patriotic War.

== Memorials ==
On April 30, 1944, the exhibition "Heroic Defense of Leningrad" opened in Leningrad. The exhibition was enormously popular among Leningrad residents and city visitors. In just the first three months after opening, it was visited by more than 150,000 people. The exhibition covered in detail, among other things, the battles on the Luga Line. On October 5, 1945, the Sovnarkom of the RSFSR decided to transform the exhibition into a museum of republican significance — The Museum of the Defense of Leningrad. In terms of attendance, the museum ranked second after the Hermitage. Over 40,000 m² in 37 halls housed more than 37,000 exhibits illustrating the course of the battle for Leningrad and the life of the besieged city. The 4th hall was dedicated to the fighting on the distant approaches to Leningrad; it featured photographs, maps, and illustrations depicting individual moments and the scale of defensive construction. Among them was a panel by the artist V. A. Serov titled "Construction of Defensive Structures." On the central wall was a panel by the artists G. Kh. Rozenblyum and A. S. Bantikov "Farewell to the Militiamen," along with the banner of the Sverdlovsk Division, portraits, maps, diagrams of combat operations, and weapons of the militiamen. The exhibition was complemented by an electrified model of the Luga fortified region.

However, in 1949, the museum was closed due to the escalating "Leningrad Affair", and by March 1953, the Museum of the Defense of Leningrad ceased to exist. The collections, scientific auxiliary materials, scientific archive, and economic property were transferred to the State Museum of the History of Leningrad, part of the exhibits and the library to the Museum of Political History of Russia, and another part to various military units and museums. Some manuscripts from the museum were also transferred to the archive of the Ministry of Defense of the USSR. At the same time, some exhibits were damaged, and others were lost.

As of the mid-2010s, several museums feature the battles on the Luga Line: the local history museums of Luga and Kingisepp, the revived Museum of the Defense of Leningrad, the exposition "Leningrad During the Great Patriotic War" at the Museum of the History of St. Petersburg, a separate section dedicated to the Luga Line in the department of the history of engineer troops at the Military Historical Museum of Artillery, Engineer Troops and Signal Corps. The museum of the Leningrad Higher Combined Arms Command Red Banner School named after S. M. Kirov and the people's museum in the House of Culture of the settlement of Bolshoy Sabsk also have sections dedicated to the battles on the Luga Line.

Numerous monuments, memorials, and commemorative signs have been erected at the battle sites:

Monuments and memorials dedicated to the defense of the Luga Line

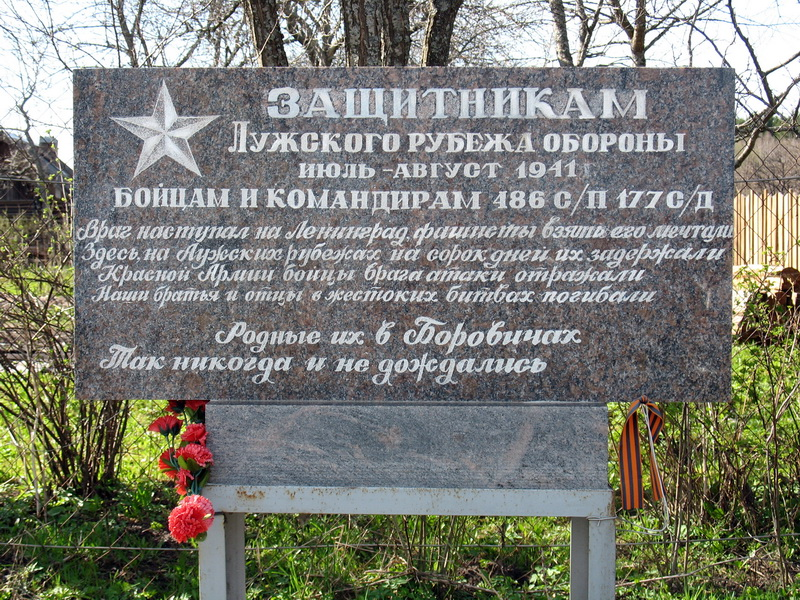
Defenders of the Luga Line of defense July — August 1941 to the soldiers and commanders of the 486th Rifle Regiment of the 177th Rifle Division 58°40′50″N 29°44′44″E

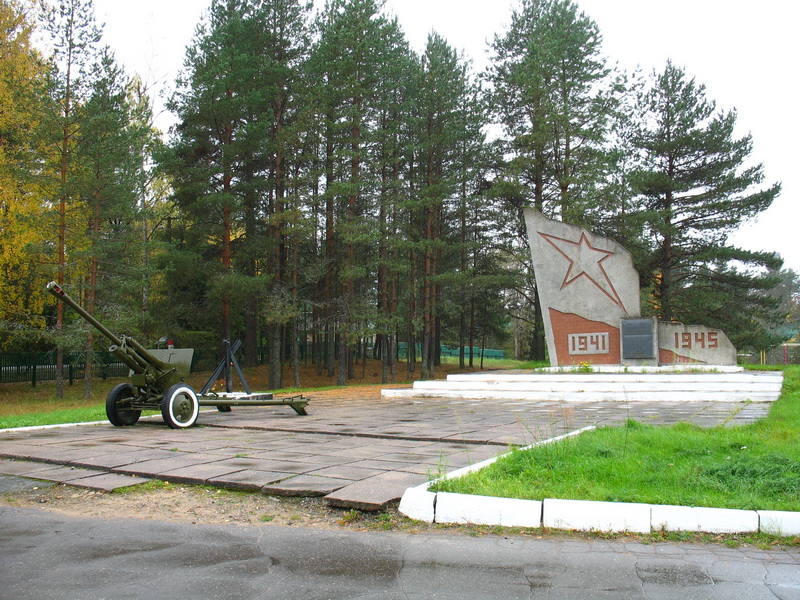
"Here on the Luga defensive line, cadets of the military school fought heroically, defending the city of Leningrad" 58°47′36″N 29°51′53″E

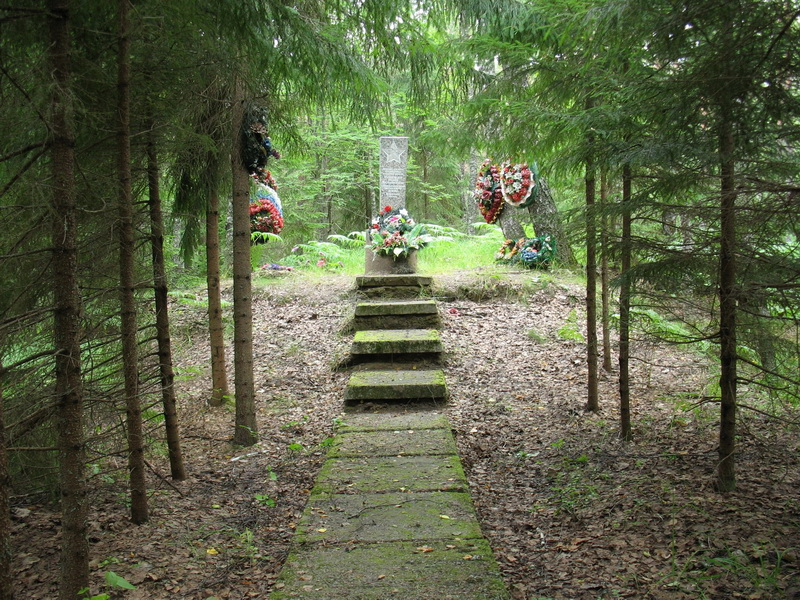
Site of the death of soldiers of the 485th Rifle Regiment of the 177th Rifle Division 58°43′28″N 29°45′30″E

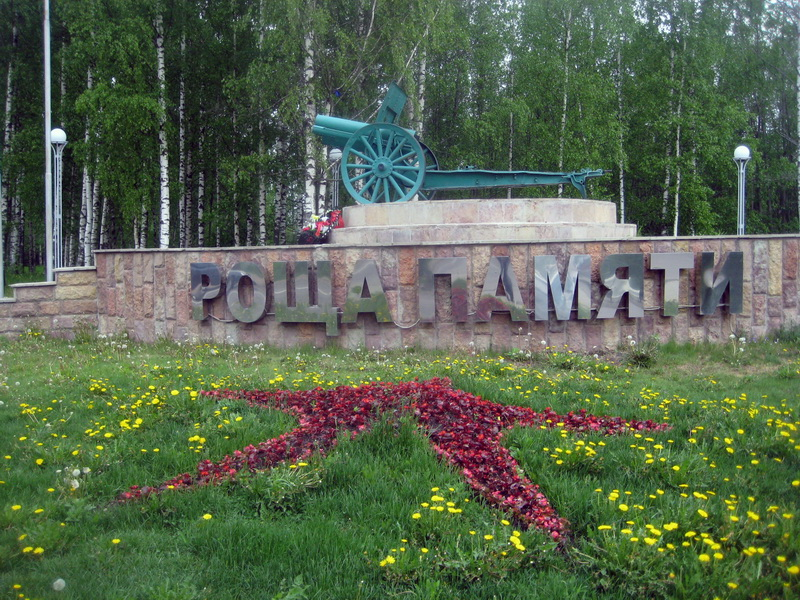
"This gun participated in the defensive battles for Kingisepp in July–August 1941" 58°22′39″N 28°35′14″E

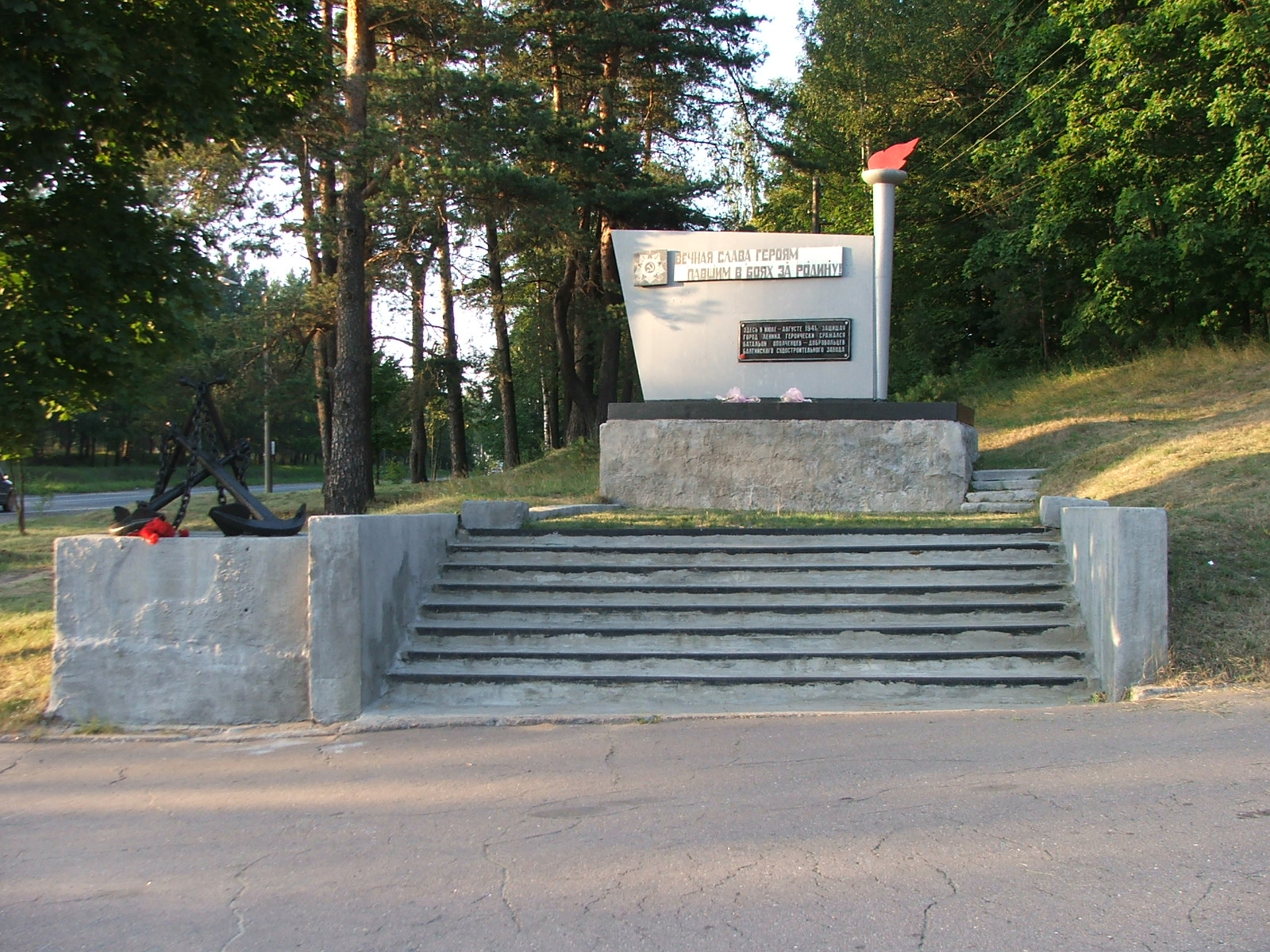
"Here in July–August 1941, defending the city of Lenin, a battalion of volunteer militiamen from the Baltic Shipbuilding Plant fought heroically" 58°42′54″N 29°50′34″E

In Novgorod, one of the sculptural bas-reliefs on the "City of Military Glory" monument-stele is dedicated to an episode of the city's defense, when during a counterattack on August 24, 1941, A. K. Pankratov became the first in history to cover an enemy machine gun with his body.

Monuments dedicated to the defense of Novgorod

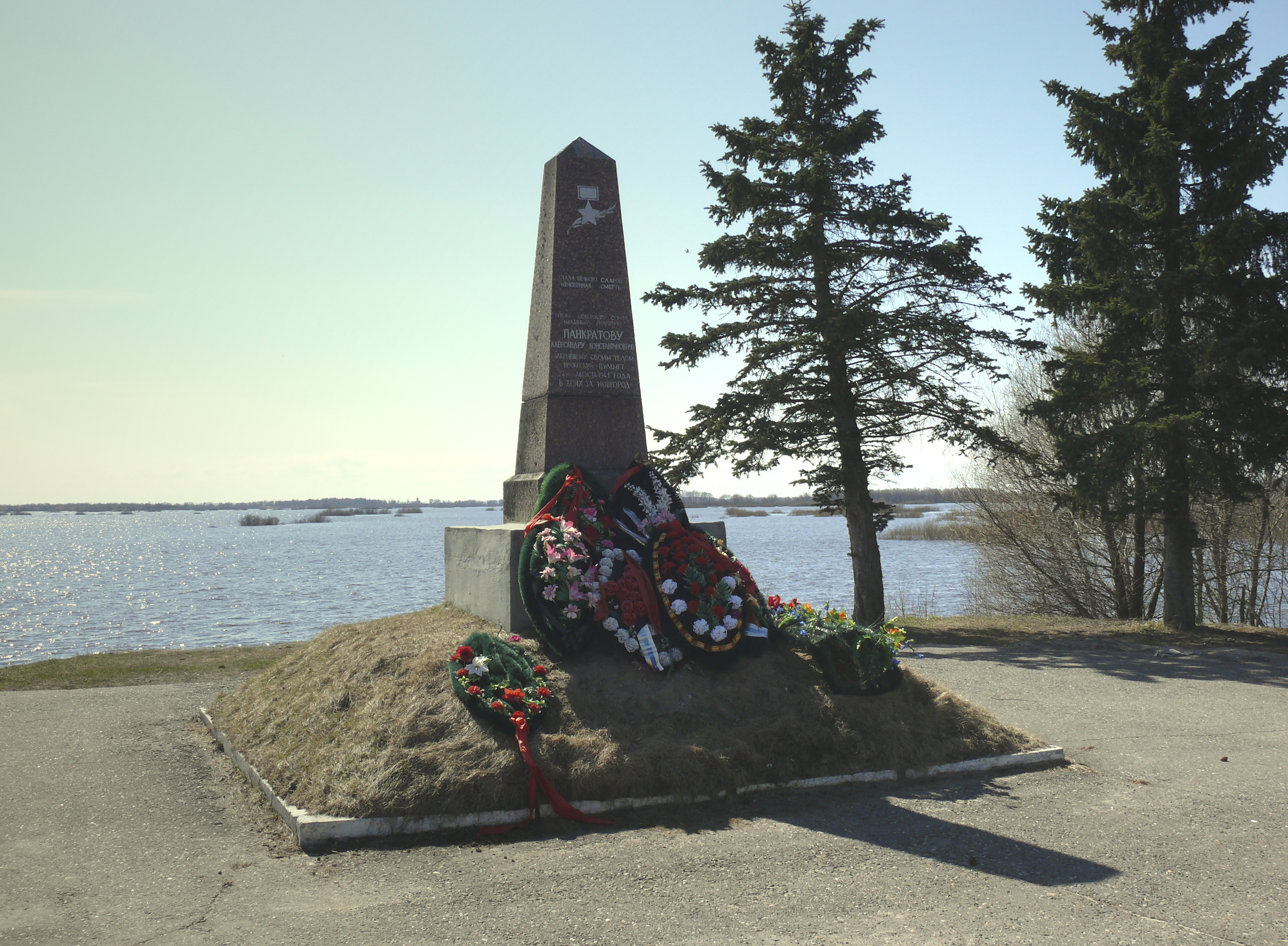
Monument to A. K. Pankratov near the Blue Bridge

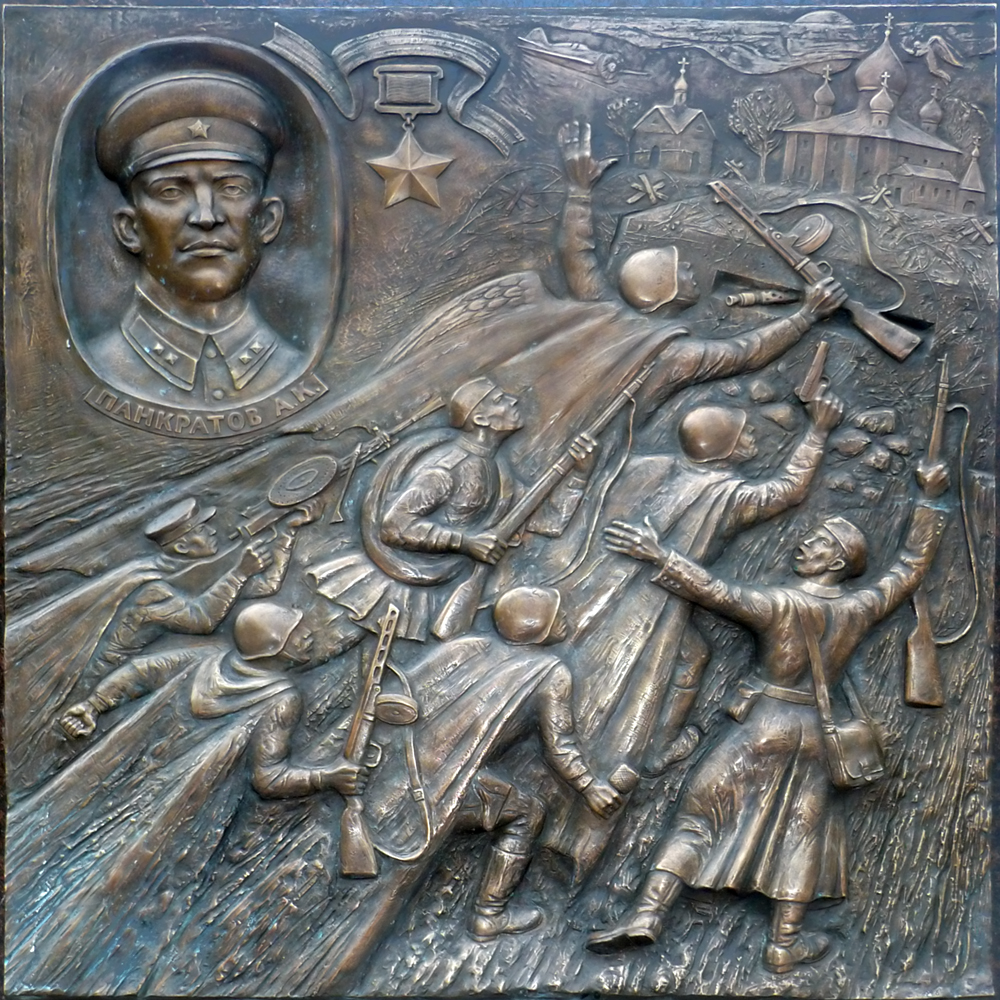
Bas-relief dedicated to the feat of Pankratov

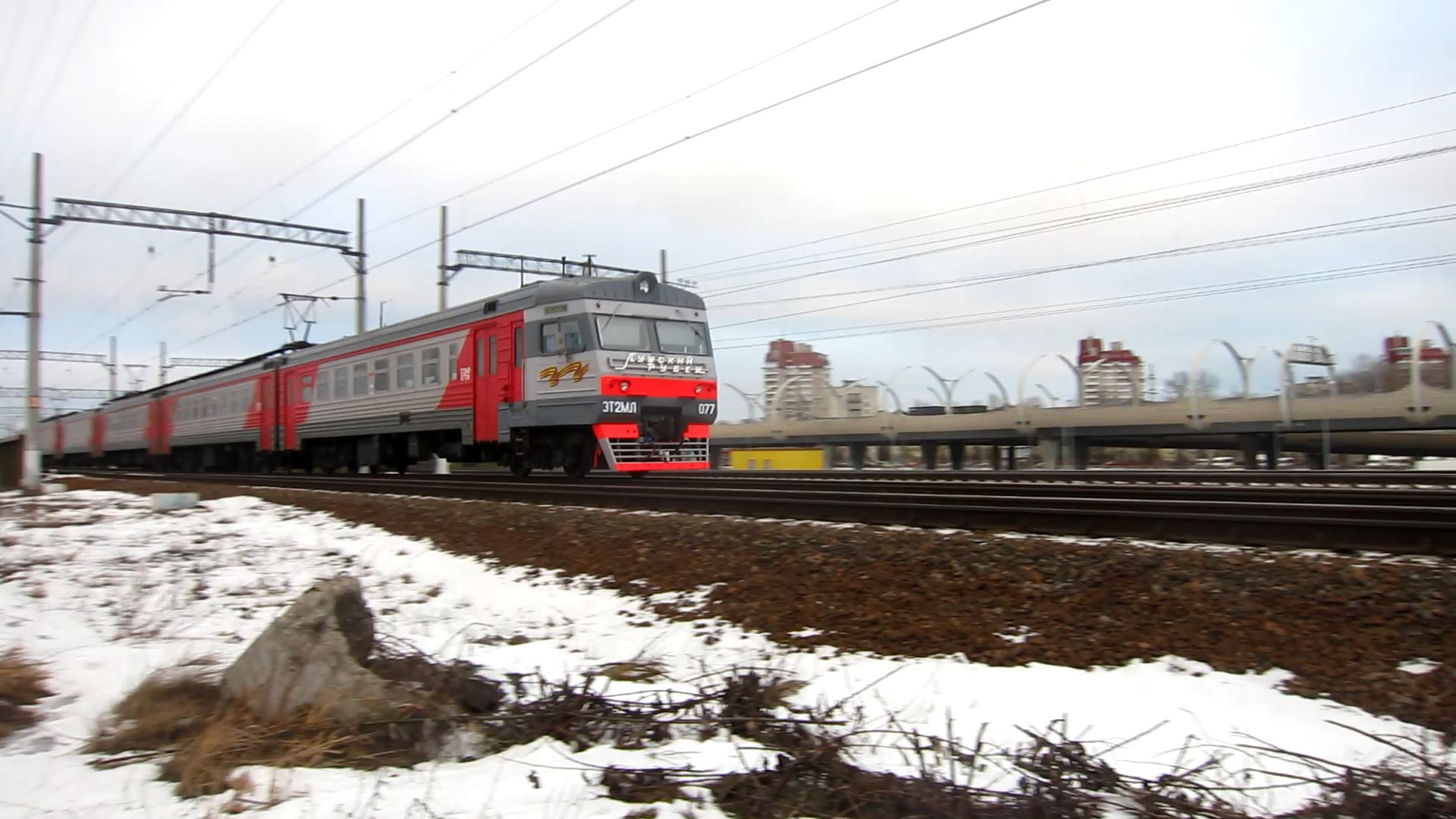
Named electric train ET2ML-077 "Luga Line"

In May 2015, the electric train ET2ML-077, operating on the Baltic direction of the Oktyabrskaya Railway, was given the honorary name "Luga Line".

== Bibliography ==
=== Books ===
- Bychevsky, B. V. (1967). Город — фронт [The City — Front]. Leningrad: Lenizdat. p. 431.
- Paul, Wolfgang (1977). В гуще боя — История 6 танковой дивизии (1 лёгкой) 1937—1945 [In the Thick of Battle — History of the 6th Panzer Division (1st Light) 1937—1945] (in Russian). Krefeld: Höntiges-Verlag.
- Halder, Franz (2010). Военный дневник [War Diary]. Moscow: AST. p. 704. ISBN 978-5-17-067688-0.
- Dashichev, V. I. (1973). Банкротство стратегии германского фашизма [Bankruptcy of the Strategy of German Fascism]. Vol. 2. Moscow: Nauka. p. 664.
- Glantz, David (2009). Блокада Ленинграда. 1941—1944 [The Siege of Leningrad, 1941—1944] (in Russian). Moscow: Tsentrpoligraf. p. 221. ISBN 978-5-9524-4170-5.
- Zheleznykh, V. I.; Tsirlin, A. D. (1952). Инженерные войска Советской Армии в важнейших операциях Великой Отечественной войны [Engineer Troops of the Soviet Army in the Most Important Operations of the Great Patriotic War]. Leningrad: Voenizdat. p. 310.
- Zvyagintsev, V. Ye. (2006). Война на весах Фемиды: Война 1941 — 1945 гг. в материалах следственно-судебных дел [War on the Scales of Themis: The War of 1941–1945 in Materials of Investigative and Judicial Cases]. Two-Faced Clio: Versions and Facts. Moscow: TERRA. p. 768. ISBN 5-275-01309-4.
- Irinarkhov, R. S. (2004). Прибалтийский особый… [The Baltic Special District...]. Military-Historical Library. Minsk: Kharvest. p. 544.
- Isaev, A. V. (2011). Иной 1941. От границы до Ленинграда [A Different 1941: From the Border to Leningrad]. War and Us. Moscow: Yauza, Eksmo. p. 416. ISBN 978-5-699-49705-8.
- Isaev, A. V. (2005). Котлы 41-го. История ВОВ, которую мы не знали [Cauldrons of '41: The History of the Great Patriotic War We Did Not Know]. Moscow: Yauza, Eksmo. p. 400. ISBN 5-699-12899-9.
- Kamalov, Kh.; Serdnak, R. V.; Tokarev, Yu. S. (1966). 900 героических дней [900 Heroic Days]. Leningrad: Nauka. p. 422.
- Volkovsky, N. L. (2005). Блокада Ленинграда в документах рассекреченных архивов [The Siege of Leningrad in Declassified Archive Documents]. Military-Historical Library. Moscow: AST. p. 766. ISBN 5-17-023997-1.
- Pospelov, P. N. (1961). История Великой Отечественной войны Советского Союза 1941—1945 в шести томах [History of the Great Patriotic War of the Soviet Union 1941–1945 in Six Volumes]. Vol. 2. Moscow: Military Publishing House of the Ministry of Defense of the USSR. p. 675.
- Grebenyuk, L. I. (2005). На огненном рубеже [On the Fiery Frontier]. Luga: Nauka.
- Collective of authors (1970). Непокорённый Ленинград [Unconquered Leningrad]. Leningrad: Nauka. p. 416.
- Zakharov, M. V. (1968). Оборона Ленинграда, 1941—1944 : Воспоминания и дневники участников [Defense of Leningrad, 1941–1944: Memoirs and Diaries of Participants]. World War II in Research, Memoirs, Documents. Leningrad: Nauka. p. 792.
- Kochakov, B.; Okun, S. B. (1964). Ленинград. Краткий исторический очерк [Leningrad: A Brief Historical Outline]. Leningrad: Lenizdat. p. 800.
- Krinov, Yu. S. (1987). Лужский рубеж. Год 1941-й [The Luga Defensive Line: The Year 1941] (2nd ed., revised and supplemented ed.). Leningrad: Lenizdat. p. 320.
- Lebedev, Yu. M. (2005). По обе стороны блокадного кольца [On Both Sides of the Blockade Ring]. Saint Petersburg: Neva.
- Malyarov, V. N. (2000). Строительный фронт в годы Великой Отечественной войны. Создание стратегических рубежей и плацдармов для обеспечения оборонительных операций вооружённых сил в годы войны 1941–1945 гг [The Construction Front During the Great Patriotic War: Creation of Strategic Lines and Bridgeheads for Defensive Operations 1941–1945]. Saint Petersburg: (Unknown).
- Mamonov, O. V. (2011). Остановленный блицкриг [Stopped Blitzkrieg]. Veliky Novgorod: Vikont Printing House.
- Mamonov, O. V. (2014). Первый контрудар Сталина. Отстоять Ленинград! [Stalin's First Counterstrike: Defend Leningrad!]. War and Us. Moscow: Yauza, Eksmo. p. 384. ISBN 978-5-699-71280-9.
- Moshchansky, I. B. (2009). Танки, вперёд! Курьезы танковой войны в битве за Ленинград [Tanks, Forward! Curiosities of Tank Warfare in the Battle for Leningrad]. Moscow: Veche. p. 192. ISBN 978-5-9533-3884-4.
- Moshchansky, I. B. (2010). У стен Ленинграда [At the Walls of Leningrad]. Moscow: Veche. p. 304. ISBN 978-5-9533-5209-3.
- Carell, Paul (2003). «Барбаросса»: От Бреста до Москвы ["Barbarossa": From Brest to Moscow]. World in Wars. Smolensk: Rusich. p. 432. ISBN 5-8138-0310-6.
- De Lannoy, François (2009). Битва за Ленинград. 1941. 22 июня - 31 декабря [The Battle for Leningrad: June 22 – December 31, 1941]. Moscow: Eksmo. p. 184. ISBN 978-5-699-34122-1.
- Husemann, Friedrich (2002). Искренне верили. История 4-й Полицейской гренадерской дивизии СС [In Good Faith: The History of the 4th SS Police Panzer Grenadier Division]. Winnipeg: J. J. Fedorowicz Publishing Inc. ISBN 978-0-9219-9174-8.
- Khomyakov, I. (2006). История 24-й танковой дивизии РККА [History of the 24th Tank Division of the Red Army]. Saint Petersburg: BODlib. p. 232.
- Khomyakov, I. (2014). Лужский рубеж. Хроника героических дней [The Luga Defensive Line: Chronicle of Heroic Days]. Battlefield. Saint Petersburg: Avrora-Design. p. 264.
- Tsirlin, A. D.; Biryukov, P. I.; Istomin, V. P.; Fedoseyev, E. N. (1970). Инженерные войска в боях за Советскую Родину [Engineer Troops in Battles for the Soviet Motherland]. Moscow: Voenizdat. p. 84.
- Chernyshev, A. A. (2014). Балтийский флот в битве за Ленинград. 1941 г. [The Baltic Fleet in the Battle for Leningrad: 1941]. Naval Chronicle. Moscow: Veche. p. 384. ISBN 978-5-4444-1662-4.
- Shigin, G. A. (2004). Ed. by N. L. Volkovsky (ed.). Битва за Ленинград: крупные операции, «белые пятна», потери [The Battle for Leningrad: Major Operations, "White Spots", Losses]. Military-Historical Library. Saint Petersburg: Poligon. p. 316. ISBN 5-89173-261-0.
- von Manstein, Erich (1999). Утерянные победы [Lost Victories]. Military-Historical Library. Moscow: AST. p. 896. ISBN 5-237-01547-6.

=== Articles ===
- Bychevsky, B. V. (1963). "В начале войны под Ленинградом" [At the Beginning of the War near Leningrad]. Military-Historical Journal (1, 2). Moscow: Ministry of Defense of the USSR.
- Danilov, P. D. (2001). "Ленинградцы на строительстве оборонительных рубежей в 1941—1942 годах" [Leningrad Residents in the Construction of Defensive Lines in 1941–1942]. Domestic History (3). Russian Academy of Sciences: 163–169.
- Moshchansky, I. B.; Khokhlov, I. V. (2002). "Ленинградская стратегическая оборонительная операция. Часть 1. Направление Северо-Запад" [Leningrad Strategic Defensive Operation. Part 1. Northwestern Direction]. Military Chronicle (4). BTV-MN: 44–70.
- Moshchansky, I. B.; Khokhlov, I. V. (2002). "Ленинградская стратегическая оборонительная операция. Часть 2. Невский бастион" [Leningrad Strategic Defensive Operation. Part 2. Nevsky Bastion]. Military Chronicle (5). BTV-MN: 2–33.
- Panichkin, Ya. A. (1973). "Это было на Лужском рубеже" [This Happened on the Luga Line]. Red Spark. No. 202–204. Borovichi.
- Polyachkov, M. G. (2014). "Подвиг и трагедия" [Feat and Tragedy] (PDF). Luga Truth. No. 53. Luga. p. 3. Archived from the original (PDF) on 2014-08-26.
- Khomyakov, I. M. (2008). "Лужский оборонительный рубеж" [The Luga Defensive Line]. Citadel (14). Saint Petersburg: 67–78.
- Gritsai, N. T. (1979). "В бою — электрозаграждения" [In Battle — Electric Barriers]. In Compiled by I. A. Leitman (ed.). Инженерные войска города-фронта [Engineer Troops of the City-Front]. Leningrad: Lenizdat. pp. 185–188.
- "Рубеж мужества" [Line of Courage] (PDF). Metrostroitel. No. 9. Saint Petersburg. 2018.
- "Метрострой на Лужском рубеже" [Metrostroy on the Luga Line] (PDF). Metrostroitel. No. 4. Saint Petersburg. 2015.

== Documents ==
- "Директива Ставки Главного Командования СССР № 91/НГШ Военному совету Северного фронта о подготовке обороны на подступах к Ленинграду от 4 июля 1941 года" [Directive of the Stavka of the Main Command of the USSR No. 91/NGSH to the Military Council of the Northern Front on Preparing Defense on the Approaches to Leningrad dated July 4, 1941]. Wikisource (in Russian).
- "Директива Ставки Главного Командования СССР Военному совету Ленинградского военного округа о подготовке оборонительного рубежа на подступах к Ленинграду от 5 июля 1941 года" [Directive of the Stavka of the Main Command of the USSR to the Military Council of the Leningrad Military District on Preparing a Defensive Line on the Approaches to Leningrad dated July 5, 1941]. Wikisource (in Russian).
- "Приказ штаба Северного фронта № 26 о создании Лужской оперативной группы от 6 июля 1941 года" [Order of the Headquarters of the Northern Front No. 26 on the Creation of the Luga Operational Group dated July 6, 1941]. Wikisource (in Russian).
- "Директива Ставки Главного Командования СССР № 00260 Командующим войсками Северного и Северо-Западного фронтов о переподчинении и задачах войск от 9 июля 1941 года" [Directive of the Stavka of the Main Command of the USSR No. 00260 to the Commanders of the Troops of the Northern and Northwestern Fronts on Resubordination and Tasks of the Troops dated July 9, 1941]. Wikisource (in Russian).
- "Оперативная директива № 3049 штаба Северного фронта о разделении Лужского оборонительного рубежа на три сектора обороны от 23 июля 1941 года" [Operational Directive No. 3049 of the Headquarters of the Northern Front on Dividing the Luga Defensive Line into Three Defense Sectors dated July 23, 1941]. Wikisource (in Russian).
- "Директива Военного Совета Северо-Западного направления № 013/оп Военным советам Северного и Северо-Западного фронтов о подготовке оборонительных сооружений на Лужском рубеже от 29 июля 1941 года" [Directive of the Military Council of the Northwestern Direction No. 013/op to the Military Councils of the Northern and Northwestern Fronts on Preparing Defensive Structures on the Luga Line dated July 29, 1941]. Wikisource (in Russian).
- "Доклад штаба 48-й армии № 00113 военному совету Северо-Западного фронта об обстановке в войсках от 11 августа 1941 года" [Report of the Headquarters of the 48th Army No. 00113 to the Military Council of the Northwestern Front on the Situation in the Troops dated August 11, 1941]. Wikisource (in Russian).
- "Директива Ставки Верховного Главнокомандования № 001199 о разделении Северного фронта на Карельский и Ленинградский от 23 августа 1941 года" [Directive of the Stavka of the Supreme High Command No. 001199 on Dividing the Northern Front into Karelian and Leningrad Fronts dated August 23, 1941]. Wikisource (in Russian).
- "Боевой приказ № 102 штаба Северного фронта командующему Лужским участком обороны генерал-майору Астанину от 24 августа 1941 года" [Combat Order No. 102 of the Headquarters of the Northern Front to the Commander of the Luga Defense Sector Major General Astanin dated August 24, 1941]. Wikisource (in Russian).
