= 34th Rifle Corps =

- Allegiance: Soviet Union
- Branch: Soviet Red Army
- Engagements: Eastern Front (World War II); Operation Barbarossa

The 34th Rifle Corps was a corps of the Soviet Red Army. It was part of the 19th Army. Towards the end of the 1939-40 Winter War with Finland it took part in General Semyon Timoshenko's offensive in the Karelian Isthmus. It took part in the Great Patriotic War. It was only partially mobilised by late July 1941 when it was fed piecemeal into combat against invading German forces at Vitebsk.

== Organization ==
- 129th Rifle Division
- 158th Rifle Division
- 171st Rifle Division

== Commanders ==
- Divisional commander Vasily Matveyevich Gonin (until February 1940)
- Divisional commander Konstantin Pyadyshev (February 1940 to May 1940)
- Division commander Prokofy Romanenko (May 1940 to June 1940)
- Major General Raphael Khmelnitsky (June 21, 1940 to August 9, 1941)
- Colonel Adrian Zakharovich Akimenko (July 24 to August 10, 1941)
