= Chudovo =

Chudovo (Russian: Чудово) is the name of several inhabited localities in Russia.

Urban localities

- Chudovo, Chudovsky District, Novgorod Oblast, a town of district significance in Chudovsky District of Novgorod Oblast

Rural localities

- Chudovo, Semyonov, Nizhny Novgorod Oblast, a village in Bokovskoy Selsoviet of the town of oblast significance of Semyonov, Nizhny Novgorod Oblast
- Chudovo, Koverninsky District, Nizhny Novgorod Oblast, a village in Bolshemostovsky Selsoviet of Koverninsky District of Nizhny Novgorod Oblast
- Chudovo, Okulovsky District, Novgorod Oblast, a village under the administrative jurisdiction of the urban-type settlement of Uglovka, Okulovsky District, Novgorod Oblast
- Chudovo, Kalininsky District, Tver Oblast, a village in Kalininsky District of Tver Oblast
- Chudovo, Staritsky District, Tver Oblast, a village in Staritsky District of Tver Oblast
