= Arrow Factory =

Defunct Independent Art space

Arrow Factory was an independent artist-run space located in Beijing. It was active between 2008 and 2019. The 15-square-meter space hosted site-specific exhibitions, performances, actions, interventions, and happenings, and offered a model for low-budget and experimental art making. The space was located in Jianchang Hutong inside the Second Ring Road in Beijing and used to be a vegetable stand before it was active as an art space.

The space had a storefront to display artwork and exhibitions were accessible to the public twenty-hour-hours a day. It was a self-reliant and non-commercial enterprise. The projects often hosted local residents, shopkeepers, and restaurant owners. During its 11.5 years of operations, Arrow Factory organized programs with many notable artists including Yan Lei, Nie Mu, Wei-Li Yeh, Liu Wei, Lin Yilin, and Ken Lum.

The founders include artist Rania Ho, artist Wang Wei, artist Wei Weng, and curator Pauline J. Yao. Artist Wei Weng stepped away from the project in 2009.

Arrow Factory ceased operations in October 2019 after they were required to curtain off their storefront by the local housing office. This request was part of Beijing's new urban policies at that time, which aimed at replacing small and low-end enterprises, including "non-capital functions and features."
