= Konstantin Pyadyshev =

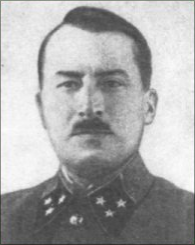

Konstantin Pavlovich Pyadyshev (Russian: Константин Павлович Пядышев; December 1890 – 15 June 1944) was a Red Army lieutenant general who held corps command in the Winter War and senior command in World War II.

== Early life, World War I and Russian Civil War ==
Konstantin Pavlovich Pyadyshev was born in December 1890 in Saint Petersburg, the son of a white-collar employee. He graduated from a realschule and passed the examination for praporshchik of the reserve in 1910. When World War I began, he was called up for active service. Pyadyshev served as a company commander, regimental adjutant, and senior adjutant for the Operations Section of the staff of an infantry division. He was wounded three times, rising to the rank of staff captain.

Pyadyshev joined the Red Army in December 1918 during the Russian Civil War. He served as assistant chief of staff and chief of staff of the 1st Petrograd Special Purpose Rifle Brigade, commanding the 2nd (later 164th) Brigade of the 55th Rifle Division and the 61st Brigade of the 21st Rifle Division. For his performance commanding the 164th Brigade, Pyadyshev received the Order of the Red Banner on 3 November 1920. The citation read:

Commander of the 164th Rifle Brigade of the 55th Rifle Division Comrade Konstantin Pavlovich Pyadyshev, during the attack on an enemy fortified position personally led units of the brigade under enemy rifle, machine gun and artillery fire. Rousing his comrades, he took the enemy fortified position with a daring charge, giving the opportunity for our cavalry to break through into the enemy rear and develop the general success. Always cool and decisive in battle, Comrade Pyadyshev precisely and accurately fulfilled all combat objectives entrusted to him, giving the opportunity for the 2nd Cossack Cavalry Corps to boldly advance on the enemy, not afraid of any incidents.

At the end of the war, Pyadyshev rose to command the 21st Rifle Division between October 1920 and April 1921.

== Interwar period and Winter War ==
Pyadyshev was appointed commander of the 10th Rifle Division in June 1922, and graduated from the Higher Academic Courses at the Military Academy of the Red Army in 1924, returning to command the division. In May 1931 he transferred to the serve as chief of staff of the military training institutions of the Leningrad Military District. In May 1934 he became chief of staff of the Red Army Military Electrical Engineering Academy. In February 1936 he took command of the 90th Rifle Division, and in March 1937 rose to deputy chief of staff of the Leningrad Military District.

During the Winter War, Pyadyshev served as deputy commander of the 7th Army and deputy commander of the Leningrad Military District. In February 1940 he became commander of the 34th Rifle Corps. After the end of the war, he commanded the 8th Army from June. In July he became deputy chief of the Red Army Combat Training Directorate, and returned to the post of deputy commander of the Leningrad Military District in May 1941.

== Eastern Front ==
When Germany invaded the Soviet Union on 22 June 1941, the Leningrad Military District was reorganized as the Northern Front, with Pyadyshev continuing as deputy commander. He was given command of the Luga Operational Group in July. Pyadyshev was arrested on 22 July. He was sentenced by the Military Collegium of the Supreme Court of the Soviet Union to ten years of imprisonment in a Gulag camp, charged with conducting anti-Soviet agitation. He died in a camp on 15 June 1944, and was posthumously rehabilitated on 28 January 1958.

== Awards ==
Pyadyshev was a recipient of the following awards:

- Order of Lenin (1940)
- Order of the Red Banner (1920, 1923, 1940)
