= Boris Vasilyev =

Boris Vasilyev may refer to:

- Boris Vasilyev (cyclist) (1937–2000), Russian Olympic cyclist
- Boris Vasilyev (writer) (1924–2013), Russian writer
