= Dulag-205 =

German prisoner of war camp

Dulag-205 was a German prisoner of war camp for Soviet prisoners in the Stalingrad pocket during the Battle of Stalingrad. Nominally a transition camp (Durchgangslager), it functioned as a death camp. The Germans fed meager rations to the prisoners until 5 December 1942. From that time until the camp's liberation on 31 January 1943 there was neither food nor water. To obtain the latter, prisoners had to melt snow that was contaminated, because the camp was overcrowded, with feces and urine. German guards of the Wehrmacht, the regular German army, beat prisoners, terrorised them with dogs, and shot them without trial. The prisoners resorted to cannibalism. On 13 October 1944, Soviets executed the captured six German officers that had been in charge of the camp.
