= Battle on the Nemiga River =

1067 battle near Minsk, Belarus

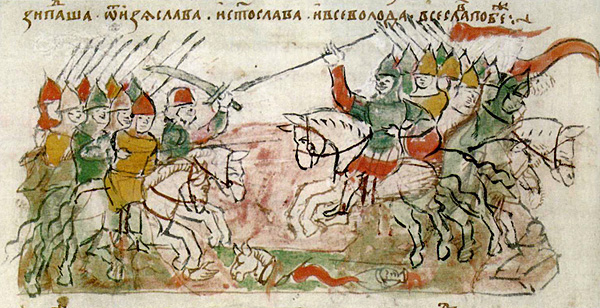
| Date | March 3, 1067 |
| Location | Niamiha River |
| Result | Kievan victory |

Belligerents
| Principality of Polotsk | Principality of Kiev; Principality of Chernigov; Principality of Pereiaslavl' |

Commanders and leaders
| Vseslav of Polotsk | Izyaslav of Kiev; Svyatoslav of Chernigov; Vsevolod of Pereyaslavl' |

The Battle on the Nemiga River (Belarusian: Бітва на Нямізе; Russian: Битва на реке Немиге) was a battle of the Kievan Rus' feudal period that occurred on March 3, 1067 on the Niamiha River. The description of the battle is the first reference to Minsk in the chronicles of Belarusian history.

== Background ==
At the end of the tenth century, Prince Vladimir Svyatoslavich, then ruling over Novgorod the Great, proposed a marriage between himself and the daughter of Rogvolod, the prince of Polotsk, who had rebuffed him, saying she did not want to take off the shoes of a slave's son. In retaliation, Vladimir attacked and pillaged Polotsk, killed Rogvolod, and took his daughter Rogneda by force, adding the city to his territorial possessions. He placed his son, Izyaslav, in Polotsk. Iziaslav's son, Bryachislav of Polotsk, succeeded his father in 1001.

By 1021, Bryacheslav set his sights on Novgorod; he attacked and ransacked the city, but on the journey home, he was overtaken by Vladimir's son Yaroslav I the Wise, then ruling in Novgorod, on the banks of the Sudoma River; he was defeated and fled, leaving behind his Novgorodian captives and loot. Yaroslav pursued him and forced Bryachislav to make peace the following year, after which the Polotsk prince settled down. After Bryacheslav's death in 1044, his son Vseslav succeeded him as Prince of Polotsk. While his father had been an irritant to the Rus princes in the Middle Dnieper region, Vseslav's campaigns in the north were much more serious. He unsuccessfully besieged Pskov in 1065, but the following year he drove out the young Novgorodian prince Mstislav, son of the Grand Prince of Kiev Izyaslav Yaroslavich, and pillaged Novgorod again. The seizure of Novgorod not only was a personal insult to the grand prince, whose son fled back to Kiev, but it threatened the Middle Dnieper princes' ties to the north – to Scandinavia, the Baltic, and tribute from the north. It also threatened the political power of the Yaroslavichi, the sons of Yaroslav the Wise, who had to that point been preeminent.

== Progress of the battle ==
The three sons of Yaroslav – Iziaslav, Vsevolod, and Sviatoslav – joined forces and marched north through the winter of 1067. They burned Minsk, then held by Polotsk, and as this is the first reference to Minsk in the chronicles, it is celebrated as the founding date of the city. The Yaroslavichi army came upon Vseslav's army in the deep snow on the Niamiha River on March 3 and defeated him. The precise course of battle is unknown, though it has become legendary as a bloodbath; The Tale of Igor's Campaign referred to "the bloody banks of the Nemiga" being sown not with blessings but with bones.

== Aftermath ==
Vseslav fled back and Polotsk and the Yaroslav princes did not pursue him. However, in June, after the battle, the Yaroslav princes called for negotiations, “kissed the cross” (took an oath) and made promises of future safety; Vseslav was invited to Iziaslav's camp to celebrate the peace and was promptly arrested together with two of his sons and taken to prison in Kiev.
