= Dedovichsky District =

Dedovichsky District Дедовичский район (Russian)
- District
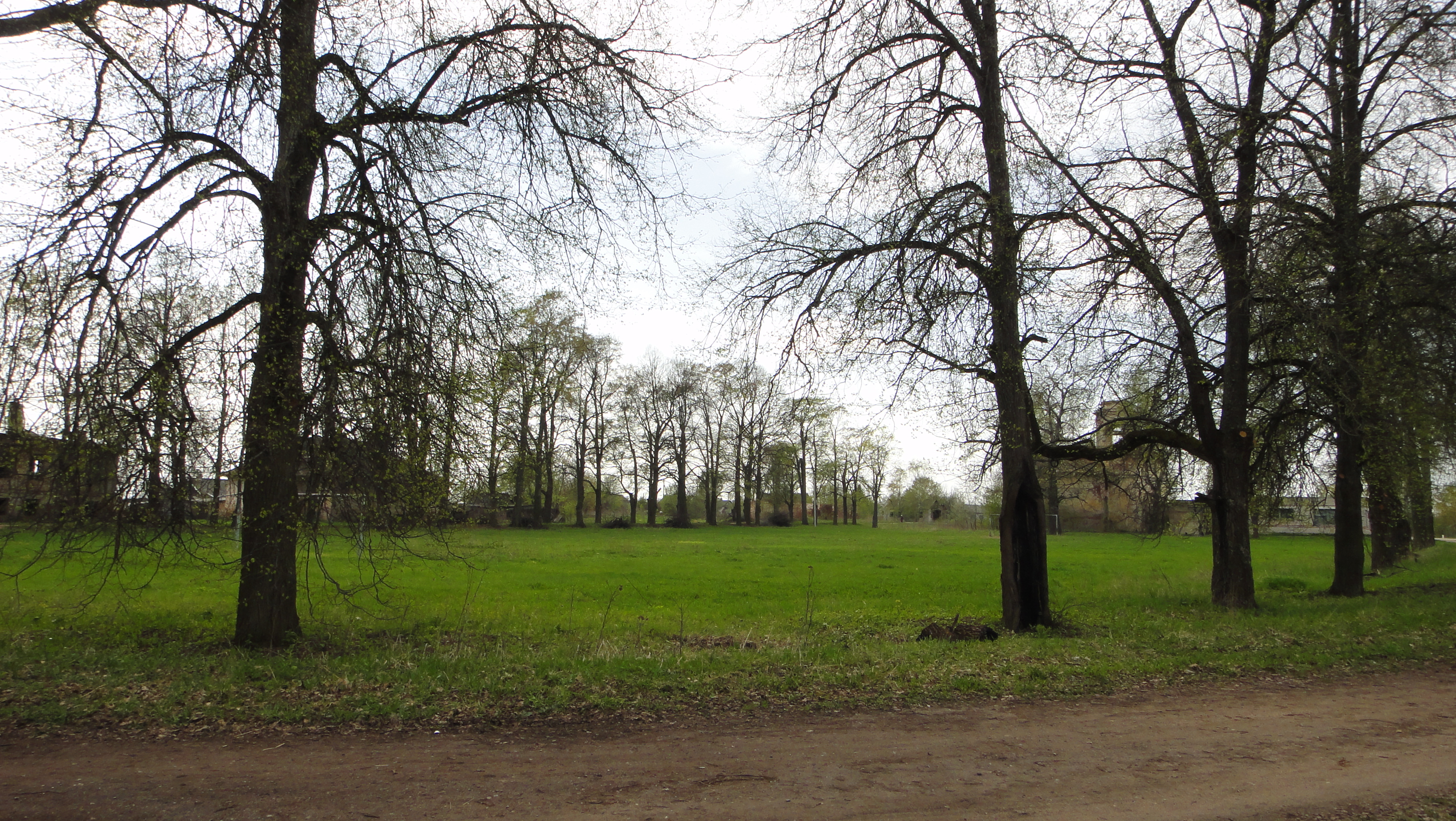
- Prince Hill Estate view, Dedovichsky District

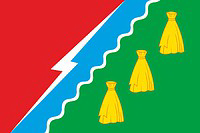
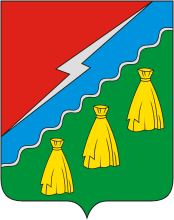
- Flag Coat of arms
- Location of Dedovichsky District in Pskov Oblast
- Coordinates: 57°33′N 29°57′E
- Country: Russia
- Federal subject: Pskov Oblast
- Established: 1927
- Administrative center: Dedovichi

Area
  - Total: 2,188 km^{2} (845 sq mi)

Population (2010 Census)
  - Total: 14,692
  - Density: 6.715/km^{2} (17.39/sq mi)
  - Urban: 59.9%
  - Rural: 40.1%

Administrative structure
  - Inhabited localities: 1 urban-type settlements, 332 rural localities

Municipal structure
  - Municipally incorporated as: Dedovichsky Municipal District
  - Municipal divisions: 1 urban settlements, 5 rural settlements
- Time zone: UTC+3 (MSK)
- OKTMO ID: 58610000
- Website: http://dedovichi.reg60.ru/

Dedovichsky District (Russian: Де́довичский райо́н) is an administrative and municipal district (raion), one of the twenty-four in Pskov Oblast, Russia. It is located in the east of the oblast and borders with Dnovsky District in the north, Volotovsky District of Novgorod Oblast in the northeast, Poddorsky District, also of Novgorod Oblast, in the east, Bezhanitsky District in the south, Novorzhevsky District in the southwest, and with Porkhovsky District in the west. The area of the district is 2,188 square kilometers (845 sq mi). Its administrative center is the urban locality (a work settlement) of Dedovichi. Population: 14,692 (2010 census); 17,881 (2002 Census); 18,948 (1989 Soviet census). The population of Dedovichi accounts for 59.9% of the district's total population.

== Geography ==
Almost the whole area of the district lies in the basin of the Shelon River and thus of the Neva River and of the Baltic Sea. The Shelon crosses the district, entering it from the northeast, flowing southwest, and then making a turn to the northwest. The principal tributary of the Shelon within the district is the Sudoma (left). Minor areas in the southwest of the district are in the basin of the Sorot River, a tributary of the Velikaya River, and thus in the basin of the Narva River. There are many lakes in the west of the district, the biggest of which are Lakes Ivankovskoye, Gorodnovskoye, Uzskoye, Lokno, Glubokoye, Naverezhskoye (the source of the Sudoma), and Sevo.

Forests cover 32.8% of the district's territory. The western part of the district is occupied by humid spruce woods, while in the eastern part dry forests, such as spruce and pine, dominate. 7.7% of the district's territory is occupied by bush. Swamps are common in the south and the southeast.

== History ==
The area was first mentioned in the chronicles in relation to the events of 1021, when the army of the Kievan prince Yaroslav the Wise defeated the troops of the prince of Polotsk, Bryachislav of Polotsk, at the Sudoma River. Subsequently, the area went under control of the Novgorod Republic. A prominent fortress of the time, located on the Shelon, was Vyshgorod. Later, the area was annexed by the Grand Duchy of Moscow. It was a part of Shelonskaya Pyatina, one of the five pyatinas into which Novgorod lands were divided. In the course of the administrative reform carried out in 1708 by Peter the Great, the area was included into Ingermanland Governorate (known since 1710 as Saint Petersburg Governorate). In 1727, separate Novgorod Governorate was split off, and in 1772, Pskov Governorate (which between 1777 and 1796 existed as Pskov Viceroyalty) was established. In 1776, Porkhovsky Uyezd was transferred from Novgorod Governorate to Pskov Governorate. The area was a part of Porkhovsky Uyezd.

On August 1, 1927, the uyezds were abolished, and Dedovichsky District was established, with the administrative center in the settlement of Dedovichi. It included parts of former Porkhovsky Uyezd. The governorates were abolished as well, and the district became a part of Pskov Okrug of Leningrad Oblast. On July 23, 1930, the okrugs were also abolished, and the districts were directly subordinated to the oblast. Between August 1941 and February 1944, Dedovichsky District was occupied by German troops. It was an area where intense partisan operations were taking place; in particular, the partisans were even operating an airfield. On August 23, 1944, the district was transferred to newly established Pskov Oblast.

On August 1, 1927, Chikhachyovsky District was established as well, with the administrative center in the selo of Chikhachyovo. It included parts of former Novorzhevsky and Porkhovsky Uyezds. The district was a part of Pskov Okrug of Leningrad Oblast. On January 1, 1932, the district was abolished and split between Dedovichsky and Bezhanitsky Districts.

Another district established on August 1, 1927 was Belebyolkovsky District with the administrative center in the selo of Belebyolka. It was a part of Novgorod Okrug of Leningrad Oblast. On September 20, 1931, Belebyolkovsky District was abolished and merged into Poddorsky District. On March 11, 1941, the district was re-established, and its territory included parts of Poddorsky and Dedovichsky Districts. Between August 1941 and February 1944, the district was occupied by German troops. On July 5, 1944, Belebyolkovsky District was transferred to newly established Novgorod Oblast. On July 22, 1961, Belebyolkovsky District was abolished and merged into Poddorsky District.

On August 3, 1939, Pozherevitsky District with the administrative center in the village of Pozherevitsy was established. It included areas formerly belonging to Dedovichsky District. Between August 1941 and February 1944, the district was occupied by German troops. On August 23, 1944, the district was transferred to newly established Pskov Oblast. In 1958, the district was abolished and split between Dedovichsky and Ashevsky Districts.

== Economy ==
=== Industry ===
In the district, there are a linum factory, a plant producing pipes, enterprises of food industry, as well as the Pskov power station.

=== Agriculture ===
The main agricultural specializations within the district are cattle breeding with meat and milk production, and hay and crops growing.

=== Transportation ===
The railway connecting St. Petersburg and Vitebsk crosses the district from north to south. Dedovichi is the most important railway station in the district.

Dedovichi is connected by road with Porkhov, Dno, and Bezhanitsy. There are also local roads with bus traffic originating from Dedovichi.

== Culture and recreation ==
The district contains six cultural heritage monuments of federal significance and additionally sixty objects classified as cultural and historical heritage of local significance. The federally protected monuments are archeological sites.
