= List of airports in Belarus =

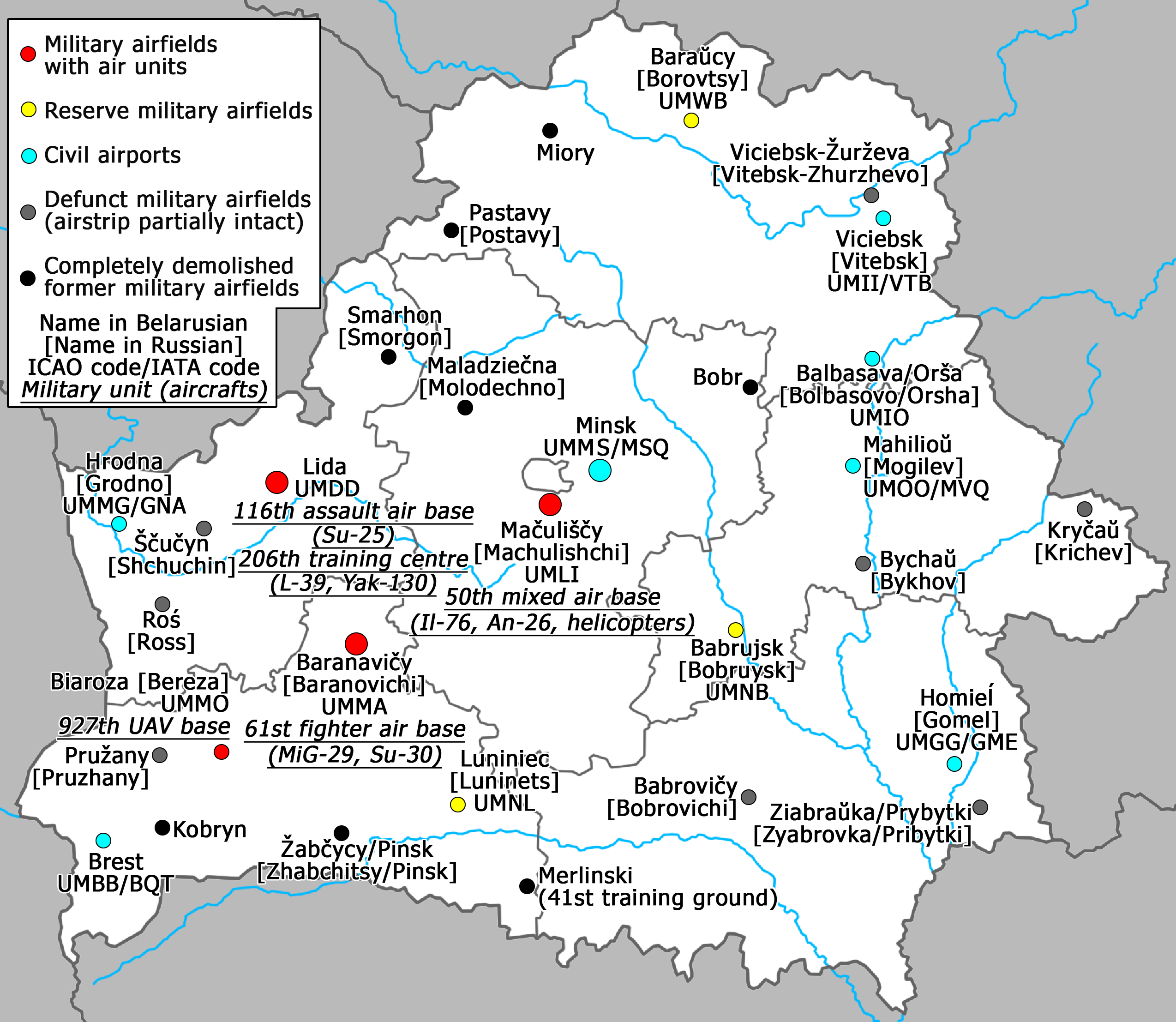
Map of airports and military airbases in Belarus

This is a list of airports in Belarus, grouped by type and sorted by location.

== Airports ==
Airport names shown in bold indicate the airport has scheduled service on commercial airlines.

City served	Province	ICAO	IATA	Airport name	Coordinates
**Public airports**					
Brest	Brest Region	UMBB	BQT	**Brest Airport**	52°06′30″N 023°53′53″E
Gomel (Homiel)	Gomel Region	UMGG	GME	**Gomel Airport**	52°31′37″N 031°01′00″E
Grodno (Hrodna)	Grodno Region	UMMG	GNA	Grodno (Hrodna) Airport	53°36′07″N 024°03′13″E
Minsk	Minsk Region	UMMS	MSQ	**Minsk National Airport** (Minsk-2)	53°52′56″N 028°01′50″E
Mogilev (Mahilyow)	Mogilev Region	UMOO	MVQ	**Mogilev Airport**	53°57′17″N 030°05′42″E
Polotsk (Polatsk)	Vitebsk Region			Polotsk Airport	55°24′42″N 028°44′54″E
Vitebsk	Vitebsk Region	UMII	VTB	Vitebsk Vostochny Airport	55°07′35″N 030°20′58″E
**Military airports**					
Gomel (Homiel)	Gomel Region			Pribytki Air Base	52°18′18″N 031°09′48″E
Luninets	Brest Region	UMNL		Luninets Air Base	52°16′30″N 026°46′30″E
Machulishchy	Minsk Region	UMLI		Machulishchy (air base)	53°46′24″N 027°34′48″E
Orsha	Vitebsk Region			Balbasovo Air Base	54°26′24″N 030°17′48″E
Pastavy (Postavy)	Vitebsk Region			Postavy Air Base	55°07′00″N 026°45′42″E
Polotsk (Polatsk)	Vitebsk Region			Borovitsy Air Base	55°36′30″N 028°40′42″E
Vitebsk	Vitebsk Region			Vitebsk Air Base	55°15′18″N 030°14′48″E
Babruysk	Mogilev Region			Babruysk Air Base	53°06′17″N 029°12′21″E
**Former airport**					
Minsk	Minsk Region	UMMM	MHP	Minsk-1 Airport	53°51′52″N 027°32′22″E

== See also ==
- Transport in Belarus
- Belarusian Air Force
- List of airports by ICAO code: U#UM - Belarus (and Kaliningrad, Russia)
- Wikipedia:WikiProject Aviation/Airline destination lists: Europe#Belarus
