= Luninets (air base) =

Luninets
- Luninets, Brest Region in Belarus
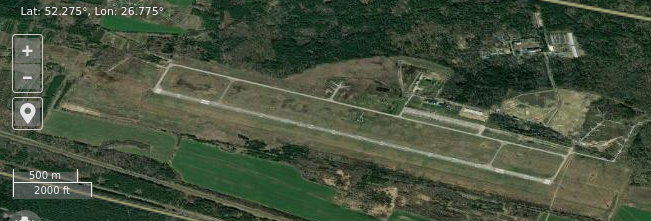
- Satellite imagery of Luninets air base

Site information
- Owner: Ministry of Defence of the Republic of Belarus
- Operator: Air Force and Air Defence Forces of the Republic of Belarus

Location
- Shown within Belarus
- Coordinates: 52°16′30″N 26°46′30″E

Site history
- In use: Unknown - present
- Battles/wars: 2022 Russian invasion of Ukraine

Airfield information
- Identifiers: ICAO: UMNL
- Elevation: 144 metres (472 ft) AMSL
Runways
Direction	Length and surface
11/29	2,500 metres (8,202 ft) Concrete

Luninets is a reserve air base of the Air Force and Air Defence Forces of the Republic of Belarus located in Luninets, Brest Region.

The airfield was a fighter-bomber training area during the Cold War. It was home to the 1169th BRAT (1169th Aviation Equipment Reserve Base) flying Mil Mi-8 and Mil Mi-24 helicopters.

During the 2022 Russian invasion of Ukraine the 18th Guards Assault Aviation Regiment was deployed here using Sukhoi Su-25s from Chernigovka (air base). These were supported by the 266th Assault Aviation Regiment with their Sukhoi Su-25's from Step (air base).

In early October 2022 it was reported that Russia had deployed approximately 20 Shahed-136 drones to the base.

== See also ==
- List of airports in Belarus
