= Dedovichi =

Dedovichi Дедовичи
- Work settlement
- Interactive map of Dedovichi
- Location of Dedovichi Dedovichi (Pskov Oblast)
- Coordinates: 57°33′N 29°57′E
- Country: Russia
- Federal subject: Pskov Oblast
- Administrative district: Dedovichsky District
- settlement: 1901
- Urban-type settlement status since: 1967

Population (2010 Census)
  - Total: 8,798
  - Estimate (2021): 6,922 (−21.3%)

Administrative status
  - Capital of: Dedovichsky District

Municipal status
  - Municipal district: Dedovichsky Municipal District
  - Urban settlement: Dedovichi Urban Settlement
  - Capital of: Dedovichsky Municipal District, Dedovichi Urban Settlement
- Time zone: UTC+3 (MSK)
- Postal code: 182710
- OKTMO ID: 58610151051

Dedovichi (Russian: Дедовичи) is an urban locality (a work settlement) and the administrative center of Dedovichsky District of Pskov Oblast, Russia, located on the Shelon River east of Pskov. Municipally, it is incorporated as Dedovichi Urban Settlement, the only urban settlement in the district. Population: 8,798 (2010 census); 9,881 (2002 census); 8,494 (1989 Soviet census).

== History ==
Whereas the area was populated from the 11th century, and an archeological site existing in Dedovichi shows that a fortress was located there in medieval times, the settlement of Dedovichi was founded in 1901 to serve a railway station, one of the five built on the stretch between Dno and Novosokolniki on the railway connecting Saint Petersburg and Kiev. At the time, Dedovichi was part of Porkhovsky Uyezd of Pskov Governorate.

On August 1, 1927, the uyezds were abolished, and Dedovichsky District was established, with the administrative center in Dedovichi. The governorates were abolished as well, and the district became a part of Pskov Okrug of Leningrad Oblast. On July 23, 1930, the okrugs were also abolished, and the districts were directly subordinated to the oblast. Between August 1941 and February 1944, Dedovichi was occupied by German troops. On August 23, 1944, the district was transferred to newly established Pskov Oblast. In 1967, Dedovichi was granted an urban-type settlement status.

== Economy ==
=== Industry ===
In Dedovichi, there are a linum factory, a plant producing pipes, enterprises of food industry, as well as the Pskov power station.

=== Transportation ===
Dedovichi is a railway station on the railway connecting St. Petersburg and Vitebsk. It is connected by road with Porkhov, Dno, and Bezhanitsy. There are also local roads with bus traffic originating from Dedovichi.

== Culture and recreation ==
Dedovichi contains one cultural heritage monuments of federal significance and three cultural heritage monuments of local significance. The federal monument is an archeological site whereas the three local monuments commemorate soldiers fallen in World War II.
