= Lake Babyna =

Lake in Belarus

- Возера Бабына (Belarusian)
- Location within Belarus
- Location: Polotsk, Belarus
- Coordinates: 55.2756°N 28.4203°E
- Type: lake
- Max. length: 1.33 kilometres (0.83 mi)
- Max. width: 0.56 kilometres (0.35 mi)
- Surface area: 0.49 square kilometres (0.19 sq mi)
- Max. depth: 32.3 metres (106 ft)
- Shore length^{1}: 3.6 kilometres (2.2 mi)
- ^{1} Shore length is not a well-defined measure.

Lake Babyna (Belarusian: Возера Бабына) is a lake, located 15 kilometres (9.3 mi) southwest of Polotsk, Belarus. It is a small lake of 0.49 square kilometres (0.19 sq mi), with a length of 1.33 kilometres (0.83 mi) and maximum width of 0.56 kilometres (0.35 mi). It has a catchment area of 6.3 square kilometres (2.4 sq mi) and a greatest depth of 32.3 metres (106 ft). The coastline is 3.6 kilometres (2.2 mi). The water volume is 6,07 mln m ³.

The slopes of the valley range in height from 7 to 40 m and are covered with pasture or forest. The shores are low, with sand and clay soils.
