= Iziaslav of Polotsk =

Iziaslav
- Prince of Polotsk
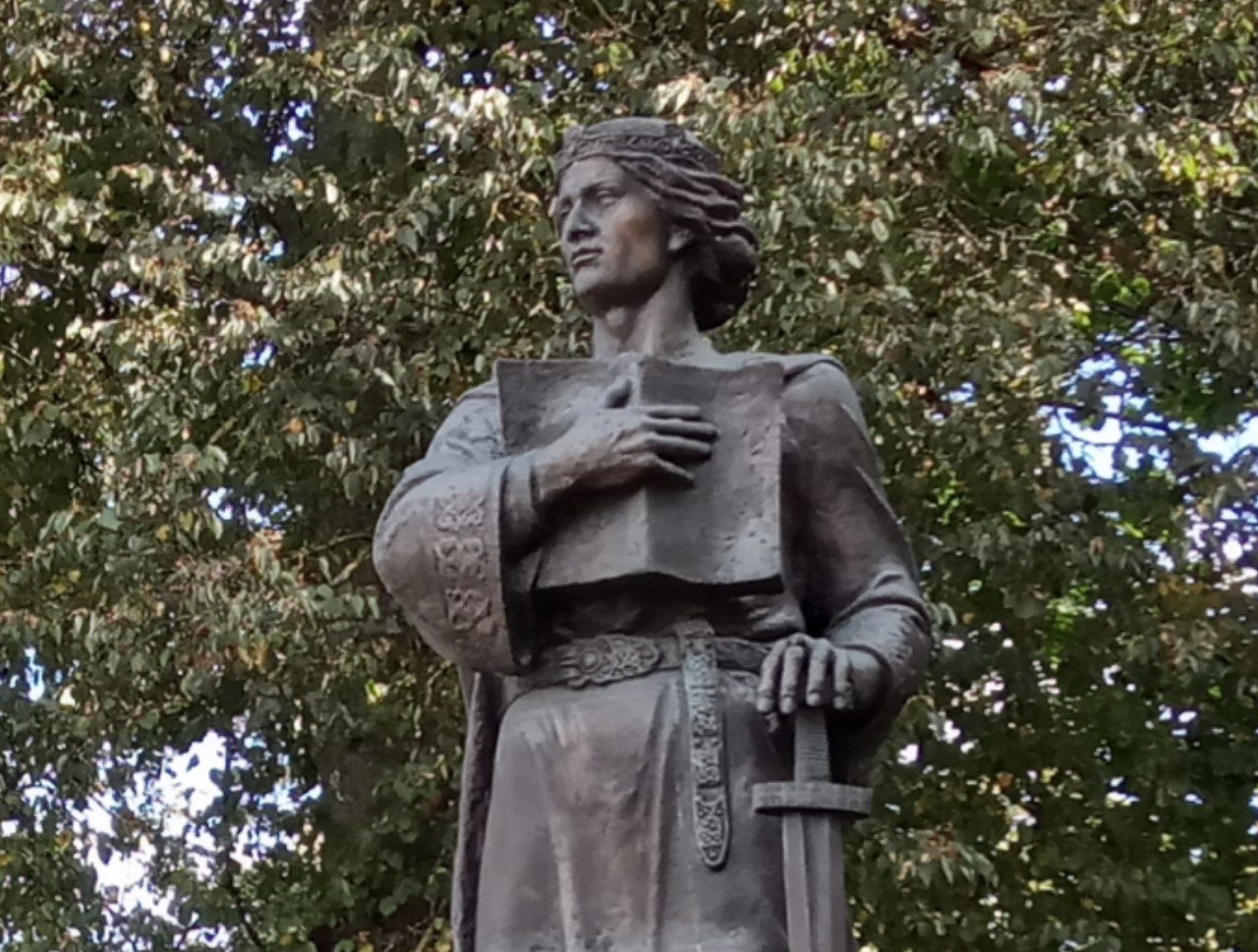
- Monument to Iziaslav in Zaslawye
- Reign: 989–1001
- Predecessor: Rogneda
- Successor: Briachislav
- Born: 978; Kiev
- Died: 1001
- Issue: Vseslav; Briachislav
Names
- Iziaslav Vladimirovich
- House: Rurik
- Father: Vladimir I of Kiev
- Mother: Rogneda of Polotsk
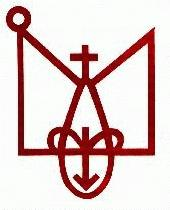
- Insignia

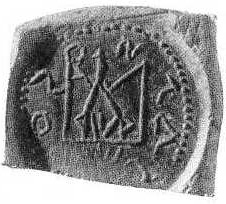

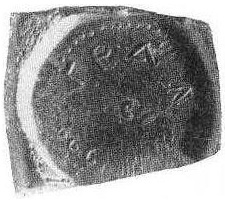
Iziaslav of Polock seal

Iziaslav Vladimirovich (Note: Russian: Изяслав Владимирович; Belarusian: Ізяслаў Уладзіміравіч; Ukrainian: Ізяслав Володимирович.) (978–1001) was the son of Vladimir I of Kiev and Rogneda of Polotsk. He was the progenitor of the Polotsk branch of Rurikid princes known as the Iziaslavichi.

== Biography ==
When his father converted to Christianity in 988, he had to divorce all his previous wives, including Rogneda. She and her son Iziaslav were exiled back to the lands of Polotsk – first to Iziaslav, and later to Polotsk.

Following Norse tradition, Iziaslav was sent with his mother to rule her homeland. There is also a legend that Rogneda tried to get Iziaslav to slay his father.

Despite possibly going against the will of his father, Iziaslav was able to continue his rule in Polotsk. He was first to make Polotsk autonomous from the grand prince of Kiev, passing his title to his descendants after his death. His principality carried a wide degree of autonomy that later was passed on to his descendants. His glory was commemorated after an established city that was named after him.

Iziaslav died at the young age of about 23, in 1001, surviving his mother but predeceasing his father Vladimir of Kiev, thus excluding his descendants from ever succeeding the Kievan throne, according to the so-called "rota system".

== Family ==
The name of Iziaslav's spouse is unknown. He had two sons: Bryachislav of Polotsk and Vseslav. Both were certainly minor at the time of his father's death. Vseslav died, still in childhood, in 1003, while Bryachislav survived to continue the Polotsk dynasty and to challenge the authority of his uncle Yaroslav the Wise. His direct progeny ruled Principality of Polotsk until 1222.

== Notes ==
Iziaslav of Polotsk Rurik Born: 978 Died: 1001
Regnal titles
Preceded by Rogneda	Prince of Polotsk; 989 - 1001	Succeeded by Bryachislav Iziaslavich
