= Polotsk Airport =

- IATA: none; ICAO: none

Summary
- Airport type: Public
- Location: Polotsk
- Elevation AMSL: 469 ft / 143 m
- Coordinates: 55°24′42″N 028°44′54″E
- Interactive map of Polotsk Airport

Runways
Direction	Length		Surface
Direction	ft	m	Surface
13/31	4,757	1,450	Asphalt

Polotsk Airport (also Polotsk South) is a civilian airfield in Belarus, located 9 km south of Polotsk.

== Airlines and destinations ==
There are no regularly scheduled services at the airport.
