= Borovitsy =

- IATA: none; ICAO: UMWB

Summary
- Airport type: Military
- Location: Polotsk
- Elevation AMSL: 456 ft / 139 m
- Coordinates: 55°36′30″N 028°40′42″E
- Interactive map of Borovitsy

Runways
Direction	Length		Surface
Direction	ft	m	Surface
10/28	8,202	2,500	Concrete

Borovitsy (also Borovitsi, Polotsk Northwest, and Borovtsy) is an air base in Belarus, located 16 kilometres (9.9 mi) northwest of Polotsk. It has a sprawling taxiway area and pads for about 40 aircraft. During the Soviet era, it was home to the 24th Guards Military Transport Aviation Regiment 1946-1956, but by the 1980s it was served only by the 276th Independent Helicopter Regiment (276th OVP) flying Mi-8 and Mi-24 helicopters.

In the 1980s the 276th Independent Helicopter Regiment was part of the 26th Air Army in 1986; then the 5th Guards independent Army Corps 1982-88, then the 7th Tank Army 1988-92.

The regiment was taken over by Belarus in 1992, reorganised, then disestablished in 2002.
