= Sudoma =

- Native name: Судома (Russian)

Location
- Country: Russia

Physical characteristics
- Mouth: Shelon
  - coordinates: 57°31′58″N 29°55′35″E
- Length: 65 km (40 mi)
- Basin size: 480 km^{2} (190 sq mi)

Basin features
- Progression: Shelon→ Lake Ilmen→ Volkhov→ Lake Ladoga→ Neva→ Gulf of Finland

The Sudoma (Russian: Судома) is a left tributary of the Shelon, with its course located in Sudoma uplands in Dedovichsky and Bezhanitsky District of Pskov Oblast of Russia. The Sudoma is part of the Lake Ilmen drainage basin. The river has a length of 65 kilometres (40 mi) and drains a basin of 480 square kilometres (190 mi^{2}). It rarely attains the width of 20 metres (66 ft), being no deeper than 1 metre (3.3 ft) along its course. It notably flows through Sosonskaya Volost where a synonymous village also exists.

One version of the name is linked to a folk tale of a family of three giants that lived in the area, the name derived from the mother of the three. The source of the river is located on the uplands of the same name, so named for apparently serving as a place of a judging ritual, the word for trial in Russian being "sud" (Russian: суд), however the source is located in Lake Naverezhskoye (Russian: озерo Навережское), and the name is only extant from the Nikonov Chronicles (1539-1542), before which it was called Sudomir', meaning "peace trial" or "decision for peace".

The most ancient settlers in the area of the river were thought to be the Krivichi Slav tribe. In 1021 Bryachislav of Polotsk suffered a defeat during the battle on the Sudoma River. The river and the uplands are both mentioned by Leo Tolstoy.

During the Second World War the area was a scene of battles between the German forces and the 3rd Leningrad partisan brigade (Russian: 3-я Ленинградская партизанская бригада) (commander Colonel A.P. German Russian: Герман) where they conducted the Rail war.

== Sources ==
- Daniël Mourad, Patterns of nutrient transfer in lowland catchments (thesis), Faculty of Geosciences, Utrecht University
- Судома in wikimapia.org
