= Principality of Polotsk =

Medieval principality of the Early East Slavs (862–1307)

Coordinates: 55°30′N 28°50′E

- 862–1504
- Iziaslav's seal avers

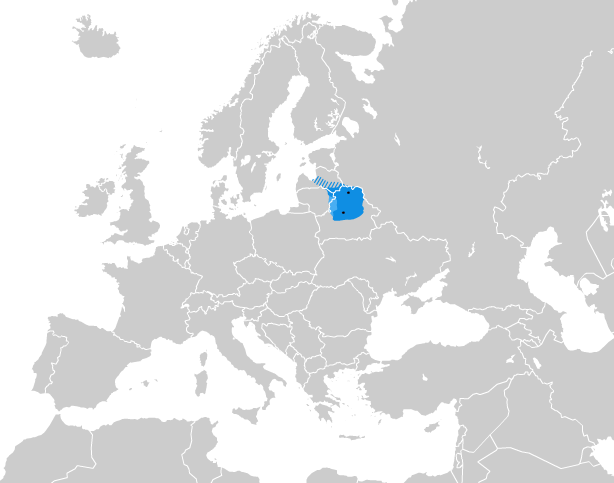
- The Principality of Polotsk on the map of Europe
- Status: Vassal of Kievan Rus' (978–1001, 1127–1132); Vassal of Livonian Brothers of the Sword (1227–1240); Part of Lithuania after 1307; Transformation into a voivodeship in 1504
- Capital: Polotsk
- Common languages: Old East Slavic
- Religion: Eastern Orthodoxy; Slavic paganism Norse paganism
- Government: Monarchy
- Prince of Polotsk
  - ?-978: Rogvolod
- Legislature: Veche
- History
  - Established: 862
  - Annexation by the Grand Duchy of Lithuania: 1504

Area
  - Total: 100,000–120,000 km^{2} (39,000–46,000 sq mi)
Preceded by	Succeeded by
Kievan Rus'	Polotsk Voivodeship
- Today part of: Belarus; Latvia; Russia

The Principality of Polotsk (also known as the Duchy of Polotsk or Polotskian Rus') was a medieval East Slavic principality centred on the city of Polotsk, in present-day Belarus. Emerging in the lands inhabited by the Krivichs, it developed into one of the major political centres of medieval Rus'. Although Polotsk was first mentioned in the Primary Chronicle under the year 862, the origins of the principality remain uncertain.

In the late 10th century, Polotsk was ruled by Rogvolod, whose defeat by Vladimir the Great brought the territory under the authority of the Rurikid dynasty. The principality subsequently developed a distinct dynastic tradition under the descendants of Vladimir's son Iziaslav. It enjoyed considerable political autonomy during the reigns of Bryachislav (1001–1044) and Vseslav (1044–1101), although its rulers remained involved in conflicts with other Rus' principalities.

Following Vseslav's death, the territory fragmented into several smaller principalities, including Minsk, Vitebsk and Drutsk. During the 12th and 13th centuries, Polotsk faced increasing pressure from neighbouring Rus' princes, German crusaders in Livonia and the emerging Lithuanian state. Lithuanian princes began ruling Polotsk in the mid-13th century, and by the early 14th century the principality had been incorporated into the Grand Duchy of Lithuania.

Under Lithuanian rule, the Polotsk region retained distinctive political institutions and a degree of local autonomy. It subsequently developed into an administrative territory of the Grand Duchy of Lithuania, becoming the Polotsk Voivodeship in 1504.

== History ==
=== Origins ===
Polotsk was formed on the basis of a fortified settlement on the bank of the Palata, near its confluence with the Daugava. The region was originally inhabited by populations associated with Baltic archaeological cultures. During the early medieval period, Slavic settlement expanded into the Middle Dvina basin, contributing to the emergence of the Polotsk Krivichians, whose formation is generally associated with the 8th and 9th centuries.

Polotsk benefited from its position along the Western Dvina, an important branch of the network of trade routes connecting the Baltic Sea with the Dnieper basin and the Byzantine world. During the 9th and 10th centuries, local political structures developed in the Middle Dvina region. The emergence of a more consolidated polity centred on Polotsk is generally associated with the 10th century, particularly the period of Rogvolod's rule.

No exact date is recorded for when the principality formed; it likely evolved over time. Polotsk is first mentioned under the year 862 in the Primary Chronicle, a text compiled in the early 12th century. According to the chronicle, Rurik assigned Polotsk to one of his followers after establishing his authority in northern Rus'.

The second mention of Polotsk came a full century later, in 980, when its ruler was a Varangian warlord, Ragnvald or Rogvolod. The chronicle reports that he arrived at Polotsk "from overseas", a routine phrase to designate Varangians. Rogvolod was an active player in the power struggle in Rus'.

=== Rogvolod and Rogneda ===
In 972, after the prince of Kiev, Sviatoslav I, died, there was a power struggle between his two sons: Vladimir, prince of Novgorod, and Yaropolk, prince of Kiev. Both had hoped for political and military support from Polotsk.

To secure this support, Vladimir proposed to Rogneda, Rogvolod's daughter. She declined, because she would not marry the son of a slave (Vladimir's mother, Malusha, is believed to have been a slave). She declared that she would prefer to marry Yaropolk. Vladimir then waged war against Polotsk. According to the Primary Chronicle, he took the city, raped Rogneda in front of her parents, then killed her entire family and burnt down the city. Rogneda was taken to Kiev to be Vladimir's wife. Thus, the local dynasty was exterminated. Rogneda bore Vladimir a son, named Izyaslav.

After Vladimir converted to Christianity in 988 and took Anna Porphyrogeneta as his wife, he had to divorce all his previous wives, including Rogneda. He planned to marry his former wives to his senior Boyars, his staunchest political allies. Rogneda refused to remarry and attempted to assassinate Vladimir. Though Vladimir planned to kill her, he gave her time to change into formal attire as was appropriate for a noblewoman meeting her death, according to contemporary custom. By the time Vladimir returned, Izyaslav blocked his path with a wooden sword, impressing his father with his bravery. Vladimir decided not to execute Rogneda but to send her back to Polotsk where she and her son inherited Rogvolod's principality.

Thus the principality was restored, but with the most senior branch of the Rurik dynasty on the local throne. Rogneda became a nun and took the name Anastasia. Since this time, the lands of the principality became Christian (Eastern Orthodox).

=== Striving for independence ===
For two centuries, descendants of Izyaslav largely controlled the Principality of Polotsk. All other lands of Kievan Rus' were under the control of princes who were descendants of Yaroslav the Wise.

In 1001, Izyaslav was succeeded by his son, Bryachislav of Polotsk. Under his rule, Polotsk attempted to distance itself from Kiev. Tensions were exacerbated by the fact that, under the East Slavic house law, since Izyaslav predeceased his father and never reigned in Kiev, his descendants from the House of Polotsk forfeited their dynastic rights to the Kievan throne. In 1020, Bryachislav sacked Novgorod but then lost it to his uncle, Yaroslav the Wise, and had to give up some of his other possessions.

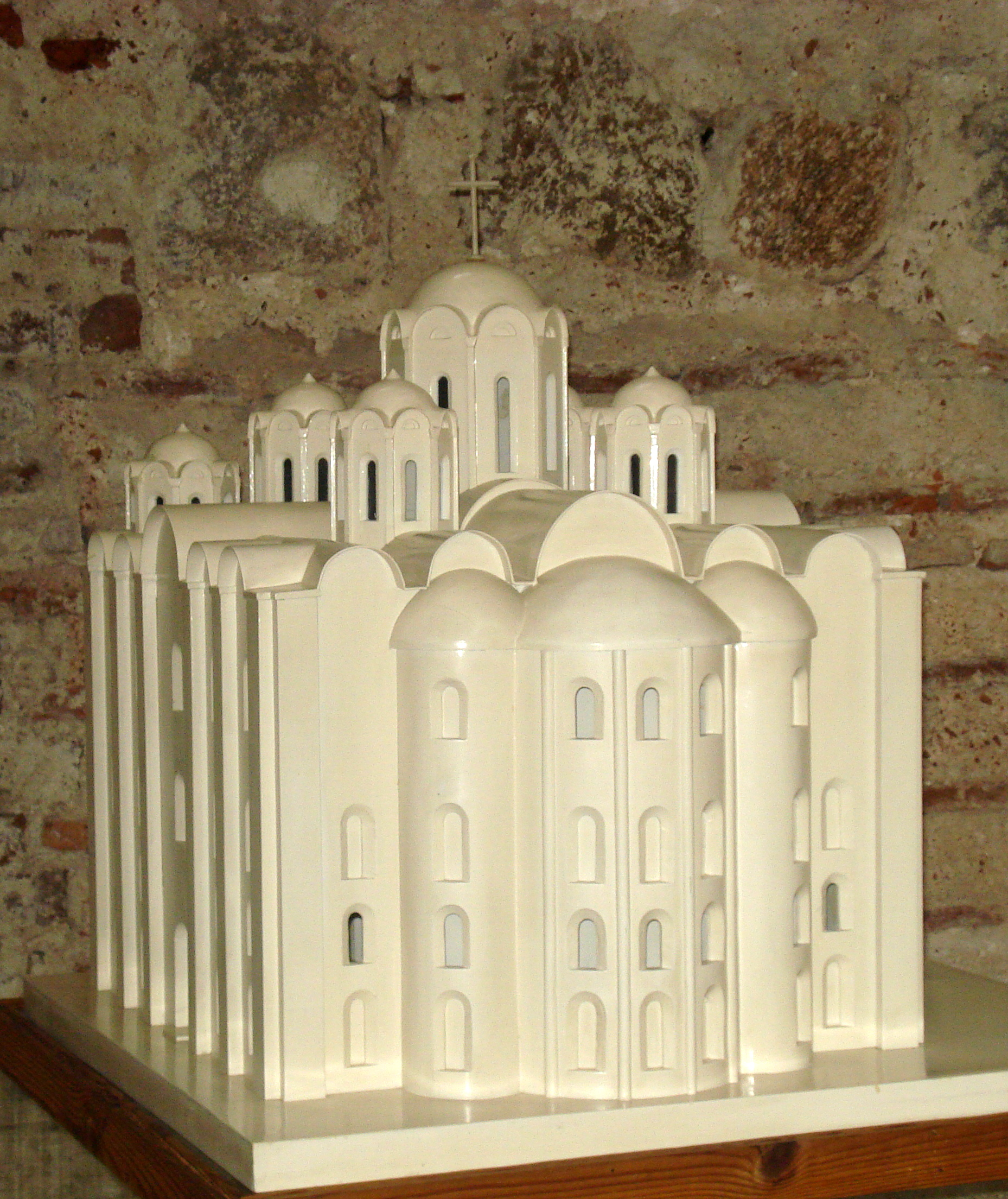
Saint Sophia Cathedral in Polotsk (rebuilt in the mid-18th century)

The golden age of medieval Polotsk is associated with the rule of Bryachislav's son, Vseslav (1044–1101). He profited from the civil wars in Kiev in order to assert his independence and run the affairs of the principality separately. During this time, Polotsk became a centre of trade, serving as a transit location between other lands of Kievan Rus' and Scandinavia. It also asserted its independent status, balancing between Kiev, Novgorod, and the Varangians. Contemporary Norse sagas described the town as the most heavily fortified in all of Kievan Rus'. After the late 10th century, Polotsk also successfully colonised some of the lands of its western neighbours, the ancestors of today's Latvians and Lithuanians. In the early 13th century, Teutonic knights seized power over the former from Polotsk, but the historical ties with the latter proved much stronger and lasted for 700 more years, although the leading role in this “marriage” soon shifted to the other side. The last pagans of Europe, brave and skilful warriors, Lithuanians initially served Polotsk as auxiliary troops in its wars with the Teutonic knights and other East Slavic principalities; but from 1183 they refused obedience to the metropoly and established their state.

The Cathedral of Saint Sophia in Polotsk – built by Vseslav between 1044 and 1066 – was a symbol of the independent-mindedness of Polotsk, rivalling churches of the same name in Novgorod and Kiev and referring to the original Hagia Sophia in Constantinople (and thus to claims of imperial prestige, authority, and sovereignty).

=== Decline ===
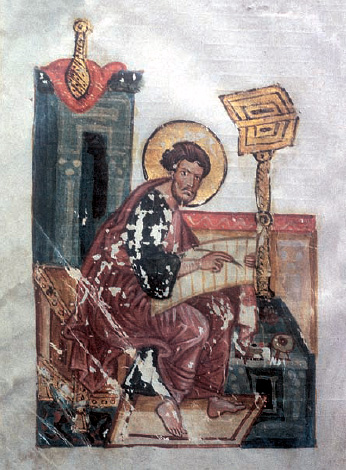
The Orsha Gospel Book was created in Polotsk during the town's period of decline in the 13th century.

After his defeat at the Battle on the river Nemiga and temporary imprisonment, Vseslav died, and his surviving sons divided the principality. Polotsk was splintered between various smaller fiefs – the Principality of Minsk, Principality of Vitebsk, Principality of Druck, Principality of Jersika, and Principality of Koknese. Local princes waged wars against each other, trying to assert control over Polotsk. At last the rulers of Vitebsk emerged victorious. For short periods, the neighbouring Principality of Smolensk also claimed control over some lands of the principality.

Beginning in the mid-12th century, changes occurred in the lands west of the Principality. The fortress of Riga became the main military base of the Livonian Brothers of the Sword. In 1209, German crusaders conquered the principalities of Jersika and Koknese in southeast Latvia, previously under Polotsk's control, forcing Polotsk to permit free travel for German merchants in 1212 and ending Livonian tributes. In 1227, Smolensk ceded Polotsk by treaty to the city of Riga.

Annals affirm the alliance and united military-campaign policy of Polotsk and Lithuania. For example, The Chronicle of Novgorod informs about "Izyaslav had been set to be Knyaz in Luki and covered Novgorod from the Lithuanians" in 1198 while Luki is situated on the east of Polotsk.

The Principality of Polotsk escaped the Mongol invasion of Rus' in 1237–1239. However, pagan Lithuanians began consolidating lands of the principality, and in 1240 Polotsk became a vassal of the Grand Duchy of Lithuania. It officially became part of Lithuania in 1307, though it retained some degree of local autonomy until the 1390s. The principality was then abolished and became part of the Polotsk Voivodeship.

== Gallery ==
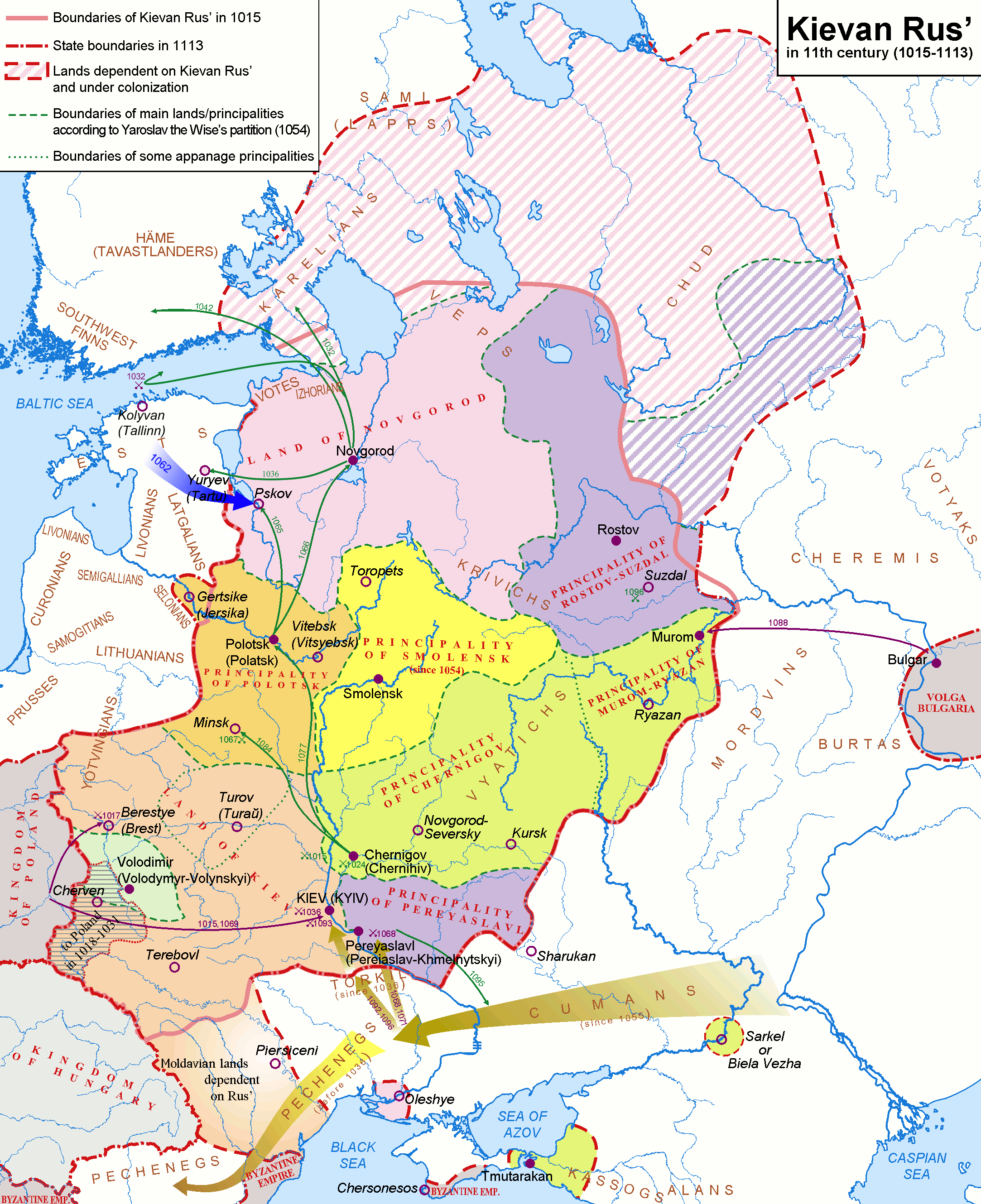
Polotsk within Kievan Rus' c. 1100

Principality of Polotsk (1132)

Polotsk in the 12th century

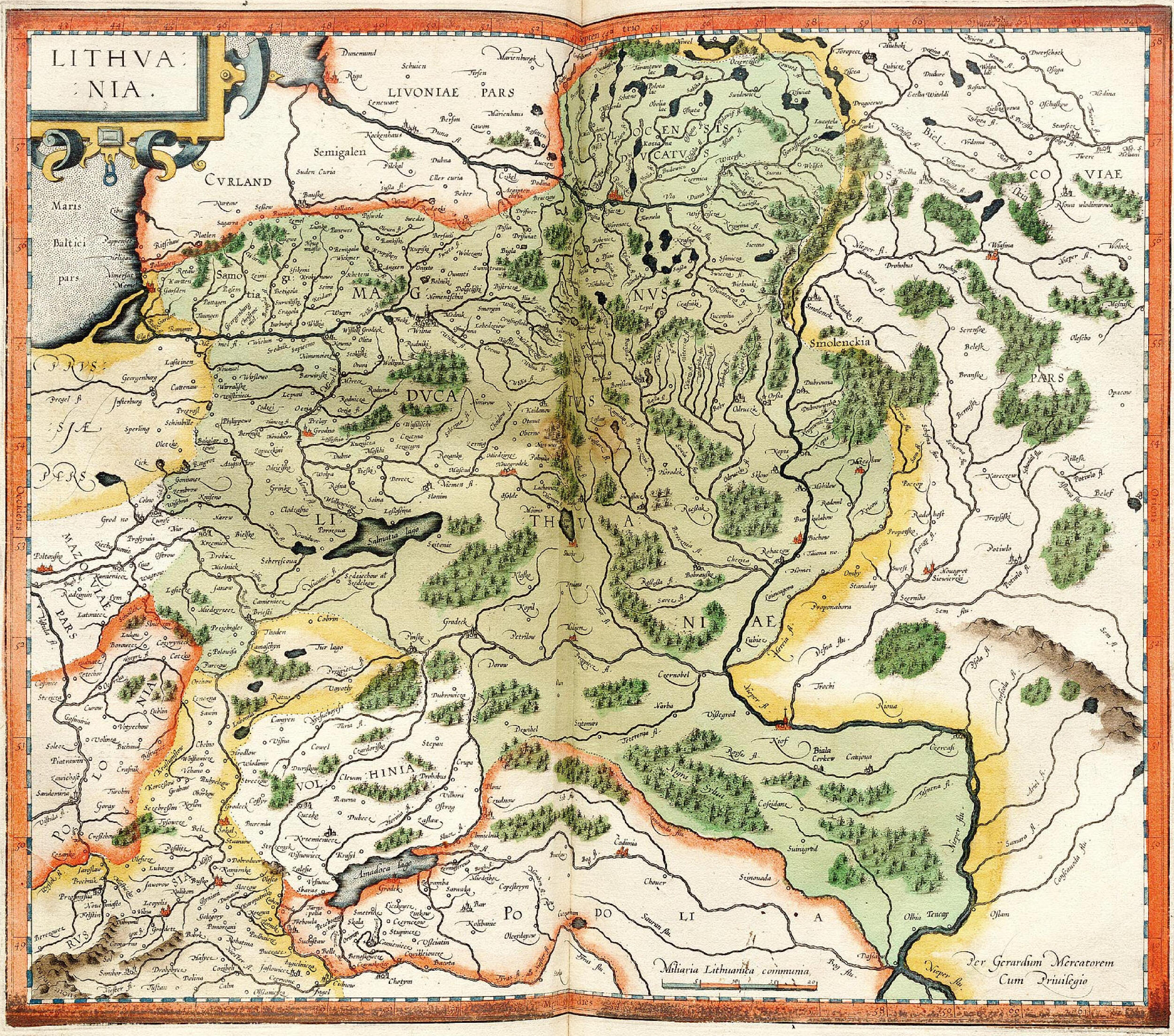
Polocensis Ducatus on a 1596 map by Mercator

Coat of arms of Lithuania's Połock and Witebsk Voivodships

== See also ==
- Prince of Polotsk
- Principality of Slutsk
- Bibliography of Russian history
