= Pskov power station =

Power station in Pskov, Russia

Pskov Power Station Pskov GRES
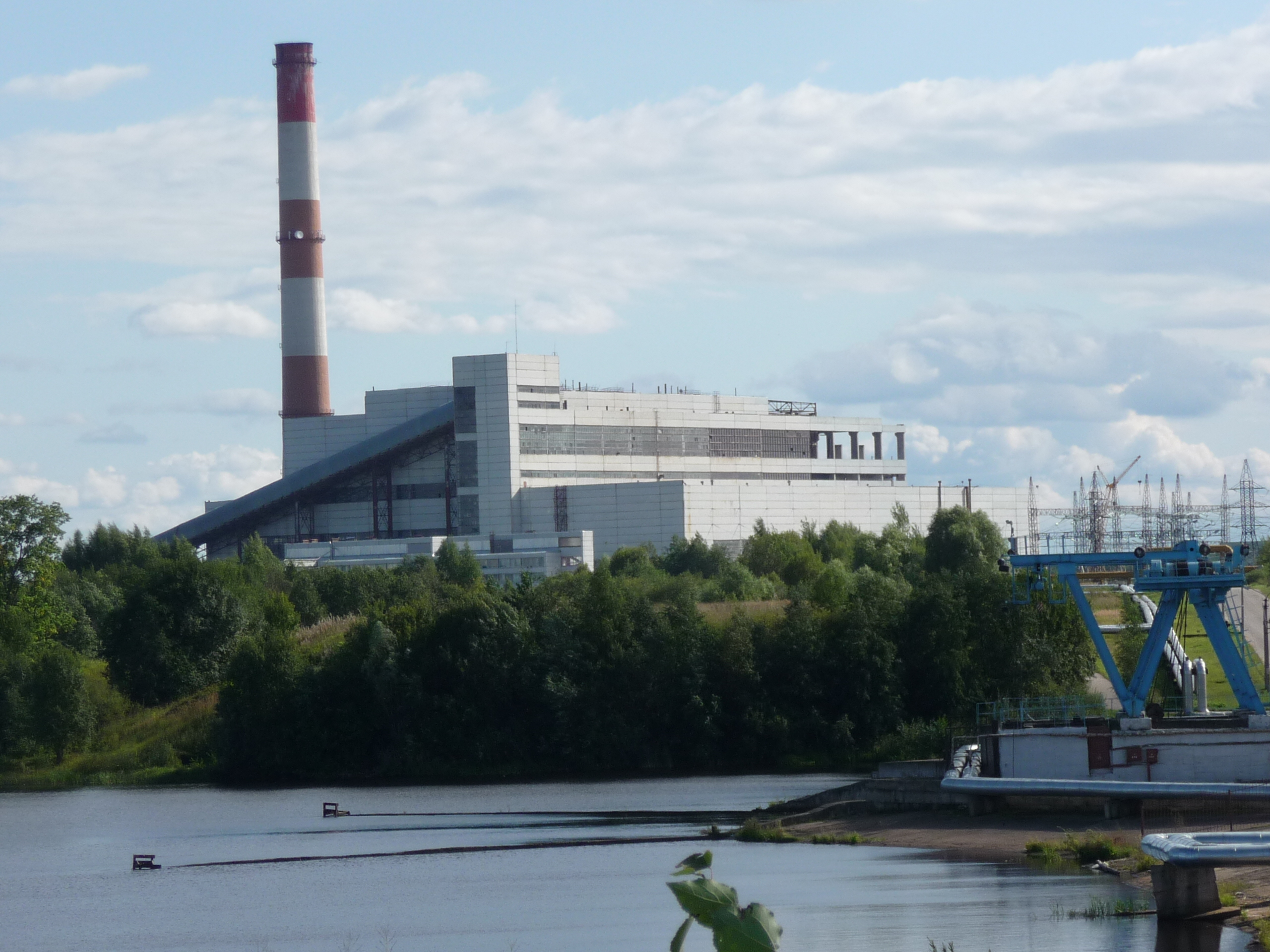
- Official name: Псковская ГРЭС
- Country: Russia
- Location: near Dedovichi, Pskov Oblast
- Coordinates: 57.51°N 29.97°E
- Status: Operational
- Construction began: 1983
- Commission date: 1993 (Unit 1); 1996 (Unit 2)
- Owner: OGK-2
- Employees: 338

Thermal power station
- Primary fuel: Natural gas
- Cooling source: Shelon river
- Cogeneration?: yes
- Thermal capacity: 91 Gcal/h

Power generation
- Units operational: 2
- Make and model: Boilers: TPE-208; Turbines: LMZ K-215-12.8; Generators: TGV-200-2MU3
- Nameplate capacity: 440 MW

External links
- Website: www.ogk2.ru/rus/branch/pskovskaya/

Pskov power station (Pskov GRES) is a large-scale Russian regional power station located 5.3 kilometres (3.3 mi) from Dedovichi urban settlement in Pskov Oblast near the western border of the Russian Federation. The station operates as a branch of OGK-2 since 2006.

== History ==
The Ministry of Energy decided to create an industrial-scale power station in Pskov Oblast for a number of reasons. Due to the absence of any local generating capacities, the region required supplies of energy produced by the power system of Leningrad (Saint Petersburg). Additionally, the plant would have created a vast number of workplaces that could have potentially reduced the overall economic backwardness of the Pskov Oblast and Dedovichi district in particular.

The construction area for the plant was established in 1964 and was approved by the Scientific and Technical council of the State Energetics and Electrification committee of the USSR in 1965. The construction project of the station was developed by Teploproekt Institute in 1967.

In 1982 the Ministry of Energy ratified the final version of the Pskov GRES project. It implied the usage of milling peat as the main type of fuel and natural gas as the reserve one. This configuration caused heated objections from the nature protection bodies as the utilisation of peat could lead to pollution and other negative influences on the environment. As a result, natural gas was selected as the main, ecologically clean type of fuel for the station.

With the recruitment of A.A. Meshkov and A.A. Uverskiy as the heads of Pskov GRES and the construction department accordingly in 1983, the active phase of the construction began.

In 1992 the extension of the main Russian export gas pipeline had been finalized, which allowed the station to receive natural gas and, thus, eliminated the lack of fuel. Subsequently, the first of two energy units of the Pskov power station was activated in August 1993. The second unit was put into action in 1996 leading the station to its target installed electrical capacity of 430 MW. The installation of the energy units was performed by CJSC “Pskovenergomontazh.”

In 2013-2014 the installed capacity of Pskov power station had been increased to reach 440 MW: the range on each of the energy units was extended by 5 MW.

== Description ==
The station has the installed electrical capacity of 440 MW and heat capacity of 91 Gcal/h. It operates 2 highly-efficient energy units consisting of a gas-stream turbine and a generator.

The energy units had been assembled and put into operation in 1993 and 1996, which makes Pskov power station one of the most recently built energy stations in Russia and the newest among the JSC "OGK-2" assets. Due to low plant utilization within previous years and provided maintenance, actual unit residual life assessment is about 50%, which in terms of availability constitutes approximately 250 000 hours or more than 28 years.

The station utilizes natural gas as the main type of fuel. The consumption of electricity for the station maintenance is 6.1% of the total production.

Pskov power station is connected to an energy supply system with a high export potential due to its close location to energy systems of Belarus and Baltic states.

Power station management is seeking opportunities to increase plant utilisation rate due to provision energy generation facilities to different investors interested in high capacities with competitive pricing terms.

Due to the declining production volumes of the station and the probability of it losing its economic efficiency, a decision was made by the Pskov region administration to create a Special economic zone on the basis of the Pskov GRES by 2021.

The main objective of the initiative is to attract potential investors from virtually any type of industry. Investors would be granted favorable tax regimes and infrastructure conditions.

Pskov GRES was added to the list of investment sites with high economic potential by the Agency for Strategic Initiatives in collaboration with the Foundation “Roskongress“.

== Management ==
Pskov power station operates as a part of OGK-2 since 2006.

Pskov power station directors:

- 2008 – 2011 – Khizhnyak V.I.
- 2011 – March 2013 – Vergeichik O.V.
- 2013 – February 2017 – Andreev Y.V.
- 2017 – present – Golubev E.G.

== Generation of heat and electrical energy ==
Energy generation data in 2010-1Q2018(in Russian):

	2010	2011	2012	2013	2014	2015	2016	2017	1Q2018
Electrical energy generation, million kWh	2,236	1,933	1,691	1,501	992	615	333	775	3
Heat generation, thousand Gcal	83	77	72	66	62	55	59	57	25
Rate of plant's capacity utilization, %	59	51	44	39	25	16	8	20	-

== Corporate social responsibility ==
Pskov GRES is the city-forming organisation of the Dedovichi urban settlement. The creation of the power plant led Dedovichi to take the position of industrial and cultural center of the Pskov Oblast.

Pskov power station is engaged in charity providing support for a number of non-profit organizations including: a local public school, an arts school for children, 2 kindergartens, a retirement house and a local orphanage.
