= Polotsk =

Polotsk Полацк (Belarusian) Полоцк (Russian) Polatsk
- Town
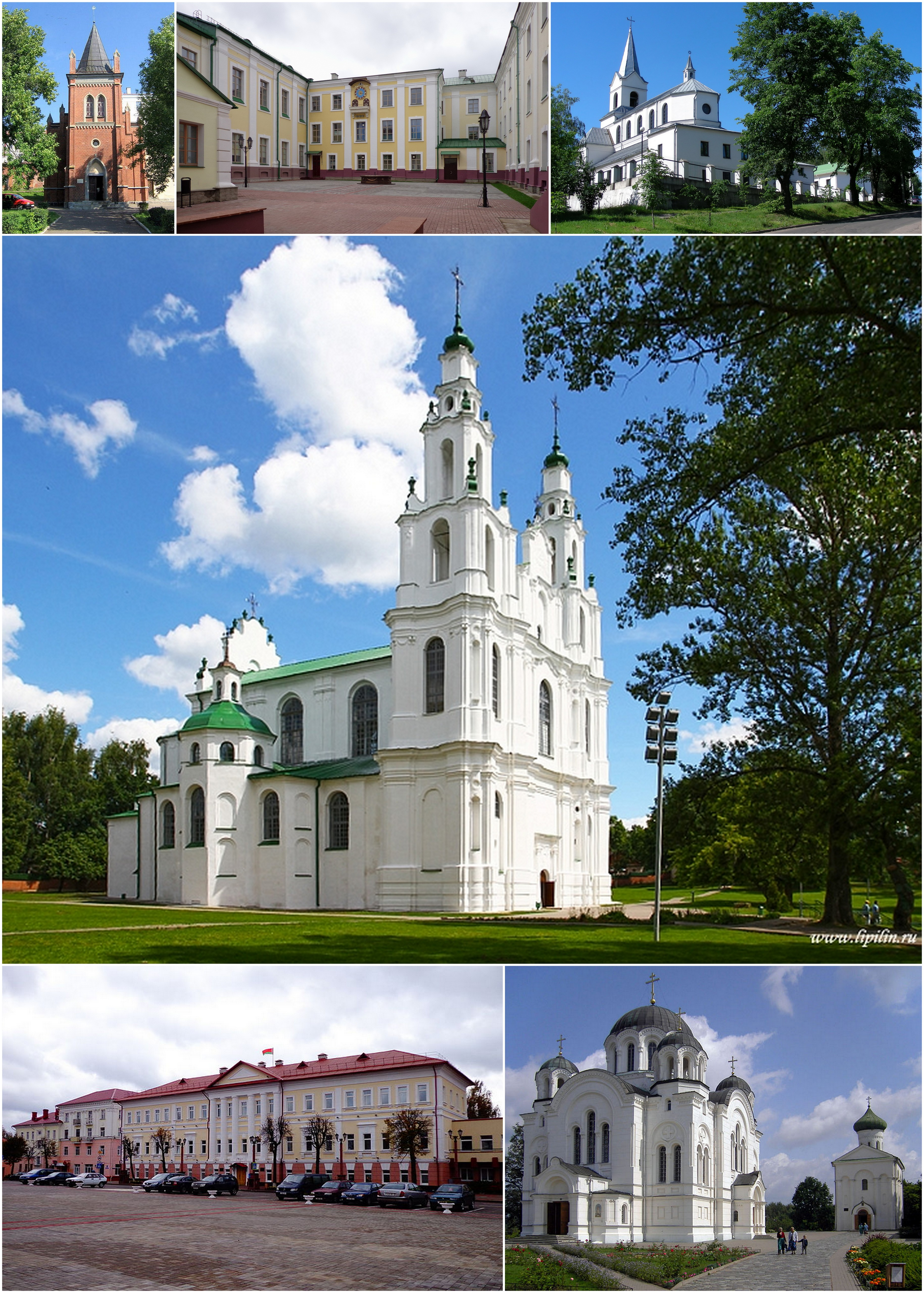

- Flag Coat of arms

- Location within Belarus
- Coordinates: 55°29′N 28°48′E
- Country: Belarus
- Region: Vitebsk Region
- District: Polotsk District
- Founded: 862

Government
  - Chairman: Nikolay Shevchuk

Area
  - Total: 40.77 km^{2} (15.74 sq mi)
- Elevation: 111 m (364 ft)

Population (2025)
  - Total: 79,285
  - Density: 1,945/km^{2} (5,037/sq mi)
- Time zone: UTC+3 (MSK)
- Postal code: 211291, 211400—211402, 211404—211415, 211422
- Area code: +375 214
- License plate: 2
- Website: polotsk.vitebsk-region.gov.by

Polotsk, (Note: Russian: Полоцк.) or Polatsk, (Note: Belarusian: Полацк, Полацак, romanized: Polack, Połacak.) is a town in Vitebsk Region, Belarus. It is situated on the Dvina River and serves as the administrative center of Polotsk District. Polotsk is served by Polotsk Airport and Borovitsy air base. As of 2025, it has a population of 79,285.

== International relations ==
Polotsk is twinned with:

- Elektrostal, Russia

== Nomenclature ==
The name may be derived from the Polota River (from Russian boloto, lit. 'marsh'), which flows into the neighboring Western Dvina, or the Polochans, a tribe. The Vikings rendered that name as Palteskja. It is also called Paltesjuborg in the Norse sagas.

== Geography ==
=== Lakes ===
- Lake Babyna

=== Climate ===
Climate data for Polotsk (1991–2020)
Month	Jan	Feb	Mar	Apr	May	Jun	Jul	Aug	Sep	Oct	Nov	Dec	Year
Record high °C (°F)	4.4 (39.9)	5.2 (41.4)	11.8 (53.2)	22.2 (72.0)	26.8 (80.2)	28.7 (83.7)	30.3 (86.5)	29.9 (85.8)	24.9 (76.8)	17.9 (64.2)	10.4 (50.7)	5.7 (42.3)	30.3 (86.5)
Mean daily maximum °C (°F)	−2.0 (28.4)	−1.1 (30.0)	4.2 (39.6)	12.4 (54.3)	18.7 (65.7)	22.1 (71.8)	24.1 (75.4)	23.0 (73.4)	17.3 (63.1)	10.0 (50.0)	3.3 (37.9)	−0.6 (30.9)	11.0 (51.8)
Daily mean °C (°F)	−4.5 (23.9)	−4.4 (24.1)	0.1 (32.2)	7.0 (44.6)	12.8 (55.0)	16.5 (61.7)	18.5 (65.3)	17.2 (63.0)	12.0 (53.6)	6.2 (43.2)	1.0 (33.8)	−2.7 (27.1)	6.6 (43.9)
Mean daily minimum °C (°F)	−6.7 (19.9)	−7.2 (19.0)	−3.4 (25.9)	2.1 (35.8)	7.2 (45.0)	11.1 (52.0)	13.3 (55.9)	12.2 (54.0)	7.8 (46.0)	3.3 (37.9)	−0.8 (30.6)	−4.6 (23.7)	2.9 (37.2)
Record low °C (°F)	−21.3 (−6.3)	−19.5 (−3.1)	−12.9 (8.8)	−4.9 (23.2)	−0.1 (31.8)	4.6 (40.3)	8.2 (46.8)	5.5 (41.9)	0.8 (33.4)	−4.8 (23.4)	−9.9 (14.2)	−14.4 (6.1)	−21.3 (−6.3)
Average precipitation mm (inches)	49.9 (1.96)	46.6 (1.83)	39.2 (1.54)	41.0 (1.61)	63.7 (2.51)	84.3 (3.32)	89.2 (3.51)	69.9 (2.75)	59.4 (2.34)	64.9 (2.56)	54.0 (2.13)	49.9 (1.96)	712.0 (28.03)
Average precipitation days (≥ 1.0 mm)	12.2	10.5	9.6	7.6	9.5	11.1	10.9	9.6	8.8	11.1	10.5	11.7	123.1
Source: NOAA

== History ==
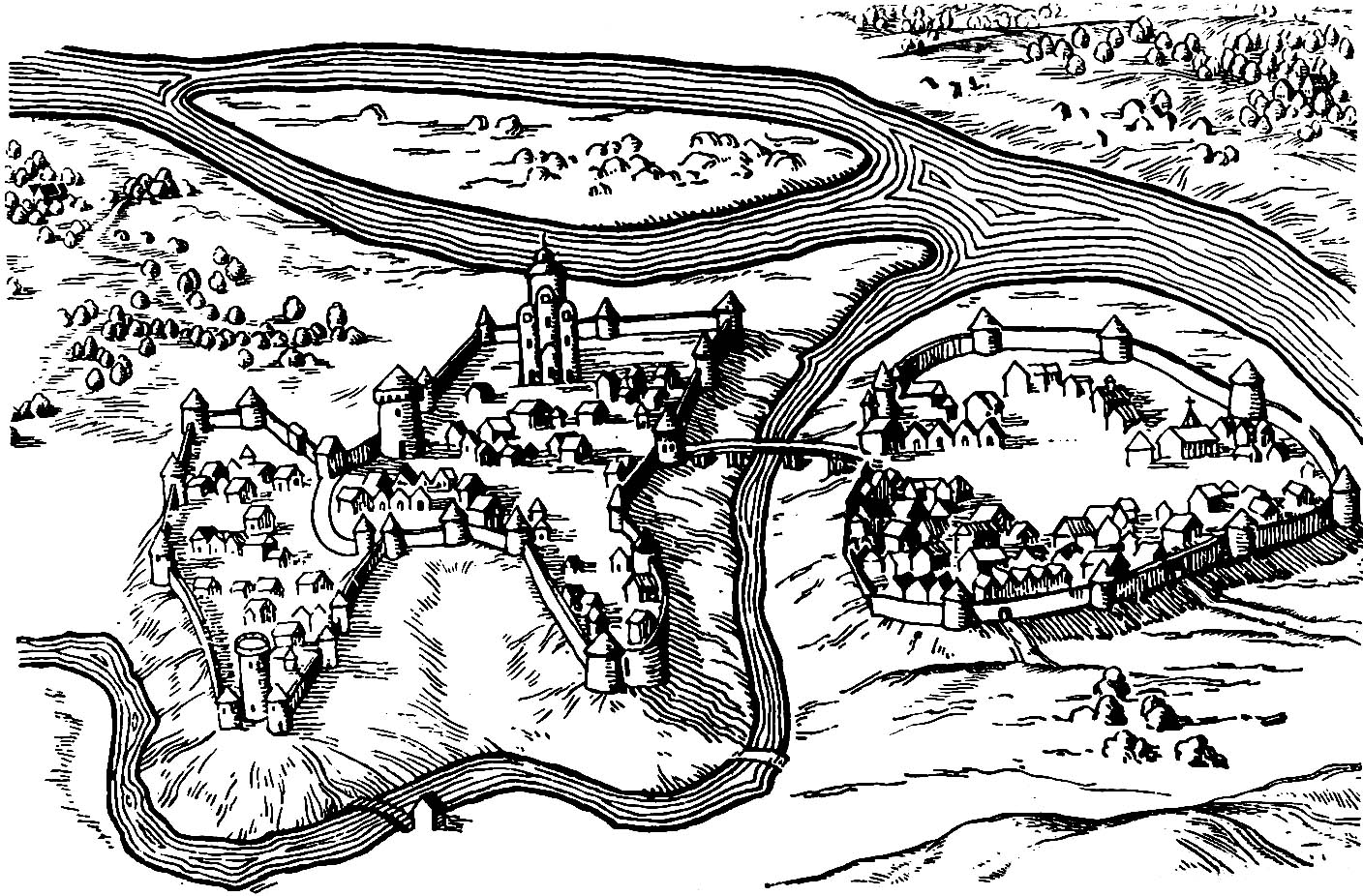
Polotsk in the 16th century.

Polotsk is one of the earliest mentioned cities of the Eastern Slavs. The Primary Chronicle mentioned Polotsk in the year 862 (as Полотескъ, /poloteskŭ/), together with Murom and Belozersk. An archaeological expedition from the Institute of History of the National Academy of Sciences of Belarus suggests that Polotsk existed in the first half of the 9th century.

The first known prince of Polotsk was Rogvolod (ruled 945–978). He had two sons and a daughter named Rogneda. Rogvolod promised Rogneda to the prince of Kiev, Yaropolk, as a wife. But Yaropolk's brother, Vladimir, had attacked Polotsk before Yaropolk came. He killed Rogvolod, his wife and sons, and married Rogneda.

Vladimir and Rogneda had five children and the eldest of them, Izyaslav, became Prince of Polotsk (ruled 989–1001).

Between the 10th and 12th centuries, the Principality of Polotsk emerged as the dominant center of power in what is now Belarusian territory, with a lesser role played by the Principality of Turov to the south. It repeatedly asserted its sovereignty in relation to other centers of Kievan Rus', becoming a political capital, the episcopal see and the controller of vassal territories among Balts in the west. Its most powerful ruler was Prince Vseslav of Polotsk, who reigned from 1044 to 1101. A 12th-century inscription commissioned by Vseslav's son Boris may still be seen on a huge boulder installed near St. Sophia Cathedral.

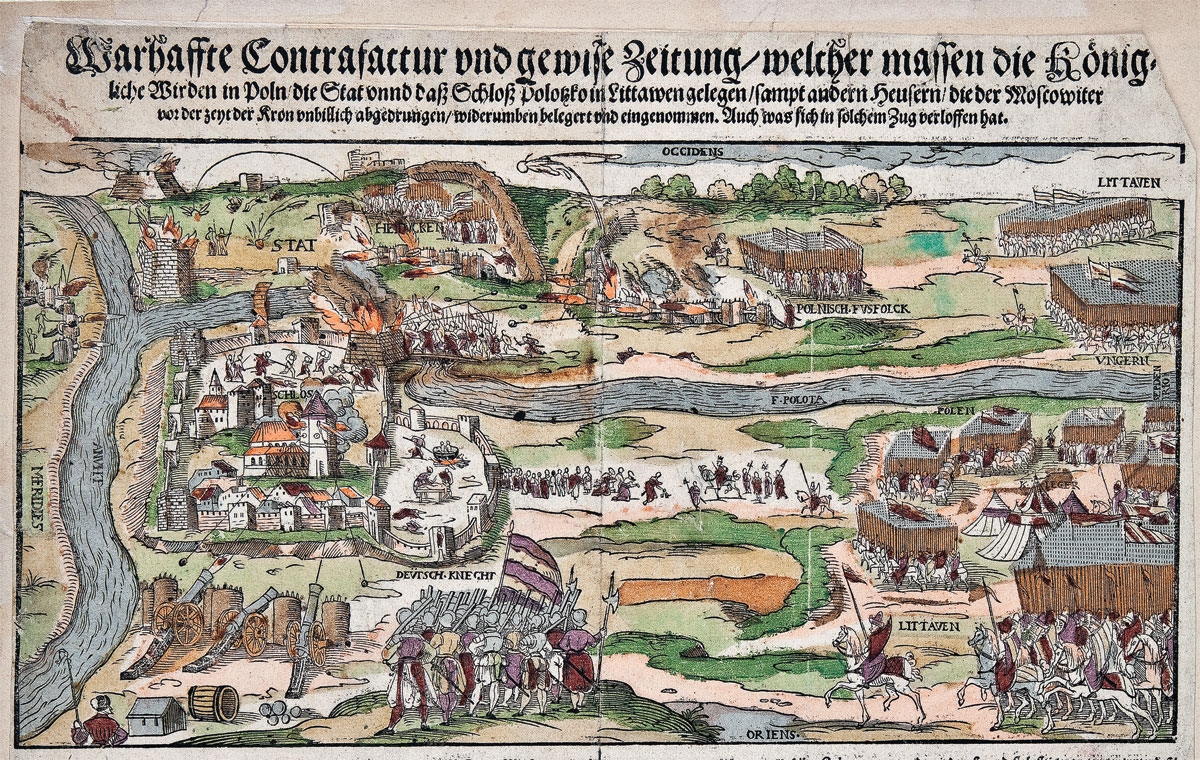
The Siege of Polotsk in 1579

During the Mongol invasion, Polotsk avoided being invaded or paying tribute to the Golden Horde. But in 1240, it became a vassal of the Lithuanian princes. The Grand Duke of Lithuania Vytenis annexed the city by military force in 1307, completing the process which the Lithuanian princes had begun in the 1250s. Polotsk received a charter of autonomy guaranteeing that the grand dukes "will not introduce new, nor destroy the old". It was the earliest to be so incorporated into the Grand Duchy of Lithuania. By doing so, the Lithuanians managed to firmly grasp the Dvina trade route in their hands, securing an important element for the surrounding economies. Magdeburg law was adopted in 1498. Polotsk functioned as a capital of the Połock Voivodship of the Polish–Lithuanian Commonwealth until 1772. Captured in the Livonian War by the Russian army of Ivan the Terrible in 1563, it was returned to the Grand Duchy of Lithuania just 15 years later. It was again captured by Russia on 17 June 1654, but recaptured by Poland–Lithuania on 30 October 1660 during the Russo-Polish War (1654–67).

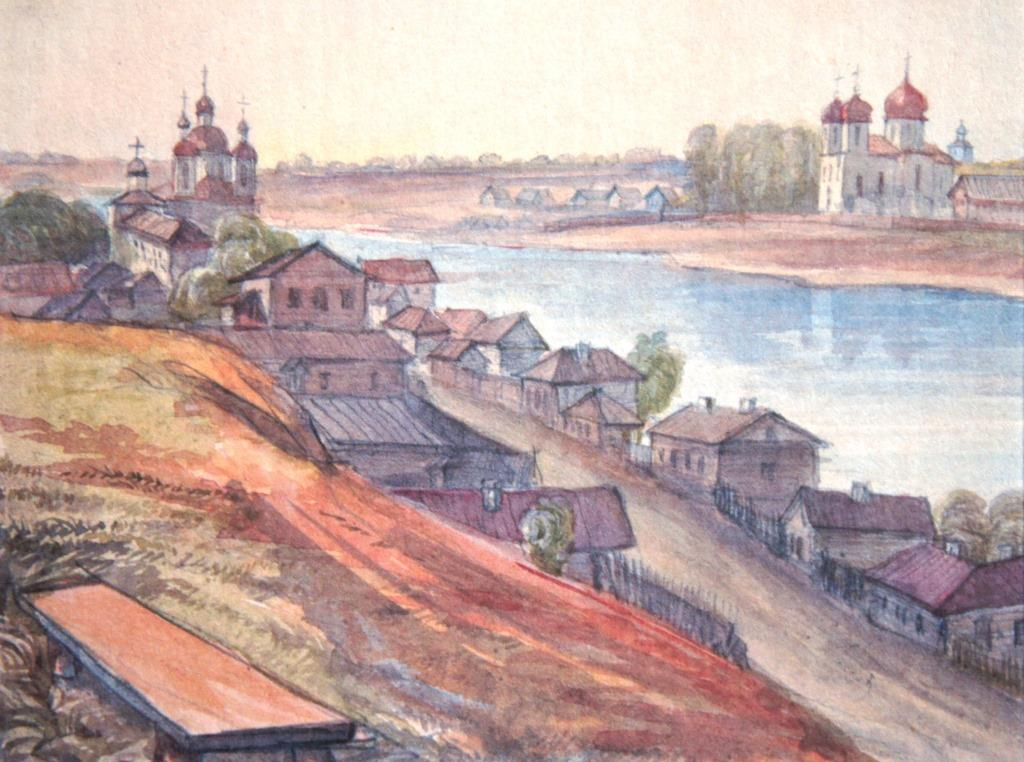
The main street of Polotsk in 1865, by Dmitry Strukov

In 1772, Russia seized Polotsk (then Połock) as part of the First Partition of the Polish–Lithuanian Commonwealth.

Since the Russian Empress Catherine II did not acknowledge the Papal suppression of the Society of Jesus (1773–1814), the Jesuit branches in these lands were not disbanded, and Połock became the European centre of the Order, with a novitiate opening in 1780, and with the arrival of distinguished Jesuits from other parts of Europe who brought with them valuable books and scientific collections. Jesuits continued their pastoral work and upgraded the Jesuit College in Polotsk (opened in 1580 by decree of the Polish king Stefan Batory, with the Jesuit Piotr Skarga (1536–1612) as its first rector) into the Połock Academy (1812–1820), with three faculties (Theology, Languages and Liberal Arts), four libraries, a printing house, a bookshop, a theatre with 3 stages, a science museum, an art gallery and a scientific and literary periodical, and a medical-care centre. The school was also the patron of the college in Petersburg, the mission to Saratov and an expedition to Canton.

During the French invasion of Russia the district saw two battles, the First Battle of Polotsk (August 1812) and the Second Battle of Polotsk (October 1812).

In 1820, pressure from the Russian Orthodox Church influenced the Russian Emperor Alexander I to exile the Jesuits and to close the Polock Academy, there were 700 students studying there. The Russian authorities also broke up the Academy's library of 40,000–60,000 volumes, the richest collection of 16th- to 18th-century books — the books went to St. Petersburg, Kiev and other cities, 4000 volumes (along with books from other closed Jesuit schools) going to the St. Petersburg State University Scientific Library.

Polotsk came under occupation by the German Empire between 25 February 1918 and 21 November 1918 during World War I, by Poland between 22 September 1919 and 14 May 1920 in the Polish–Soviet War, and by Nazi Germany between 16 July 1941 and 4 July 1944 during World War II. In August 1944, there were serious considerations to transfer Polotsk and its surrounding areas (18,000 square kilometers) with ~400,000 people from the Byelorussian SSR to the Russian SFSR; however, Joseph Stalin, persuaded by Panteleimon Ponomarenko, eventually rejected to approve the already prepared transferring documents and subsequently Polotsk functioned as the center of Polotsk Region between 20 September 1944 and 8 January 1954. A reorganisation of the area between Vitebsk and Molodechno Regions left Polotsk part of the former.

== Cultural heritage ==
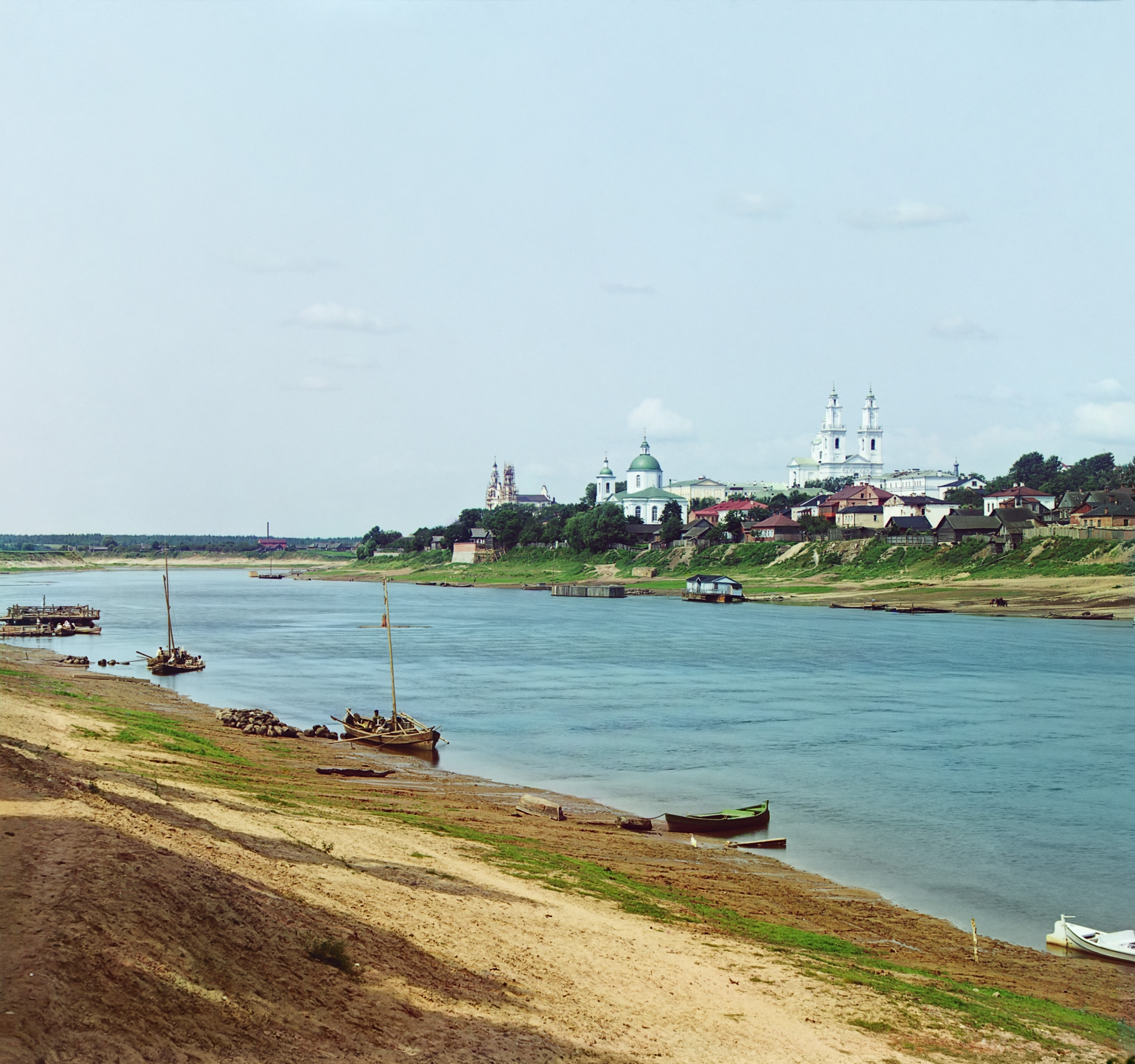
View of Polotsk in 1912

The city's Saint Sophia Cathedral (1044–1066) was a symbol of the independent-mindedness of Polotsk, rivaling churches of the same name in Novgorod and Kyiv. The name referred to the original Hagia Sophia in Constantinople, and thus claims imperial prestige, authority and sovereignty. The cathedral had been ruined by the troops of Peter I of Russia. Hence the present baroque building by Johann Christoph Glaubitz dates from the mid-18th century. Some genuine 12th-century architecture (notably Transfiguration Church) survives in the Convent of Saint Euphrosyne, which also features a neo-Byzantine cathedral, designed and built in 1893—1899 by Vladimir Korshikov.

Cultural achievements of the medieval period include the work of the nun Euphrosyne of Polotsk (1120–1173), who built monasteries, transcribed books, promoted literacy and sponsored art (including local artisan Lazarus Bohsha's famous "Cross of Saint Euphrosyne," a national symbol and treasure lost during World War II), and the prolific, original Church Slavonic sermons and writings of Bishop Cyril of Turaw (1130–1182).

The first Belarusian printer, Francysk Skaryna, was born in Polotsk around 1490. He is famous for being the first to print the Bible in the Old Belarusian language (East Slavic language) in 1517, several decades after the first-ever printed book by Johann Gutenberg and just several years after the first Czech Bible (1506).

In September 2003, as "Days of Belarusian Literacy" were celebrated for the 10th time in Polotsk, city authorities dedicated a monument to honor the unique Cyrillic Belarusian letter Ў, which is not used in any other Slavic language. The original idea for the monument came from the Belarusian calligraphy professor Paval Siemchanka, who has been studying Cyrillic scripts for many years.

== Sports ==
The city has produced players for the Belarus national bandy team. In October 2011, the team planned to participate in the Russian Cup in rink bandy, but did not after all.

== Notable people ==
- Uładzimir Arłou (b. 1953), Belarusian historian and writer
- Lyavon Barshchewski (b. 1958), Belarusian philologist and politician
- Boris Galerkin
- Andrei of Polotsk
- Bryachislav of Polotsk
- Euphrosyne of Polotsk
- Francysk Skaryna
- Gabriel Lenkiewicz
- Izyaslav of Polotsk
- Josaphat Kuntsevych (c.1580-1623) Basilian monk, Archeparch of Polotsk and Vitebsk, and Saint in the Ukrainian Greek-Catholic Church
- Mary Antin
- Rogneda of Polotsk
- Rogvolod
- Rogvolod Vseslavich
- Sophia of Minsk, Queen of Denmark
- Symeon of Polotsk
- Vseslav of Polotsk
- Vyacheslav Gordanov
- Marina Osman
- Igor Shitov
- Natalya Kochanova (b. 1960), speaker of the Council of the Republic of Belarus

== Gallery ==
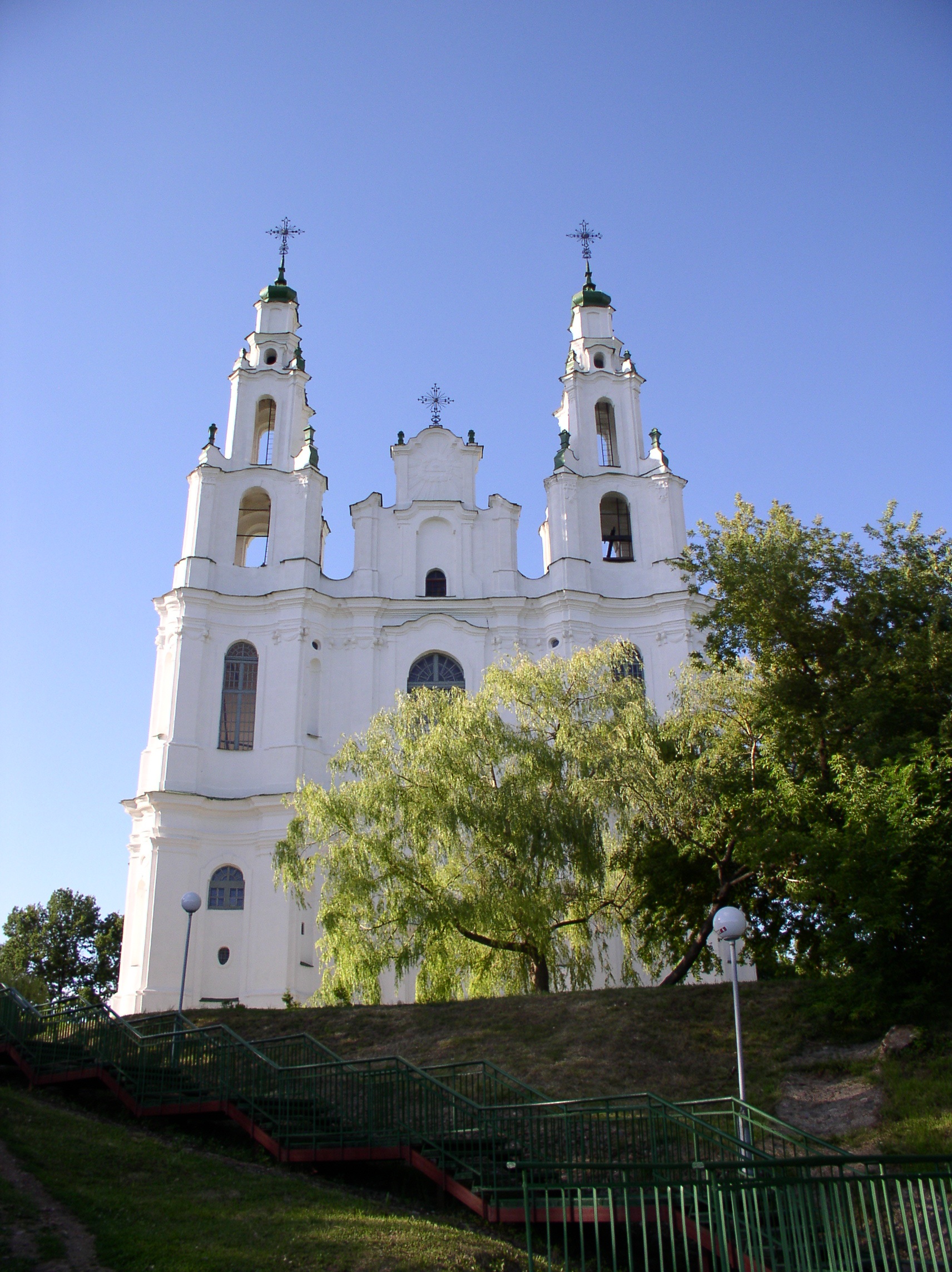
Saint Sophia Cathedral

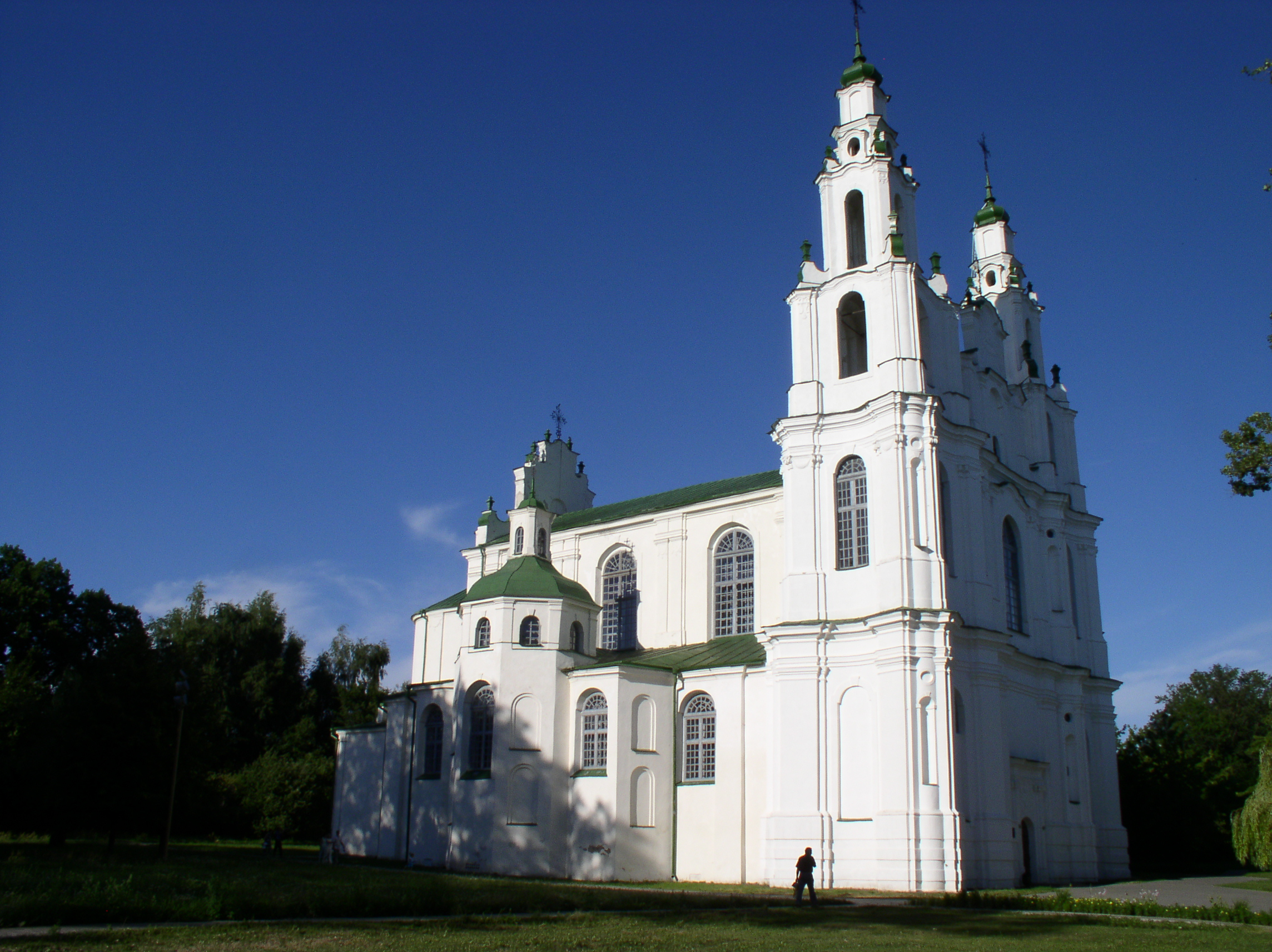
Saint Sophia Cathedral

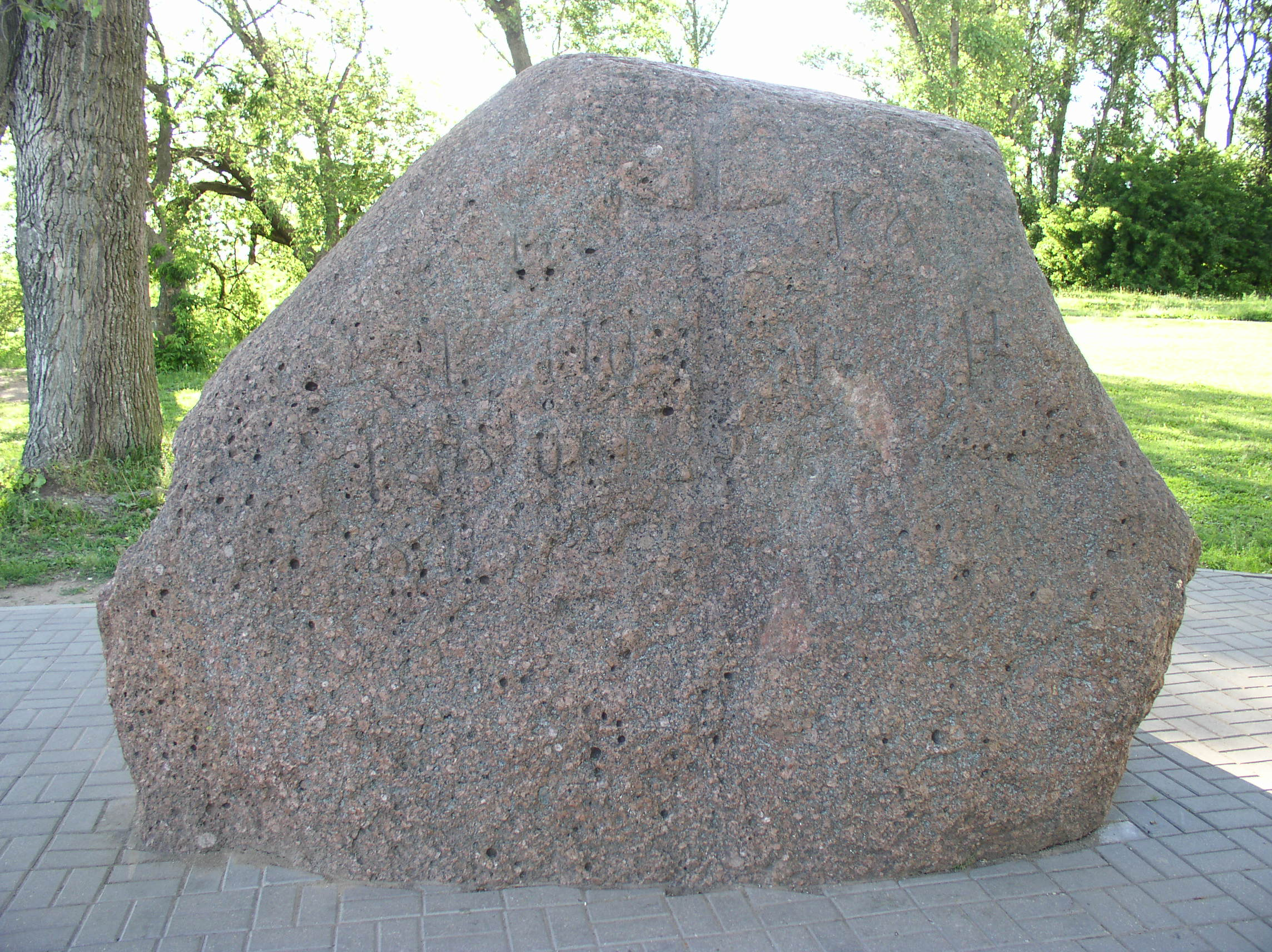
Boris stone

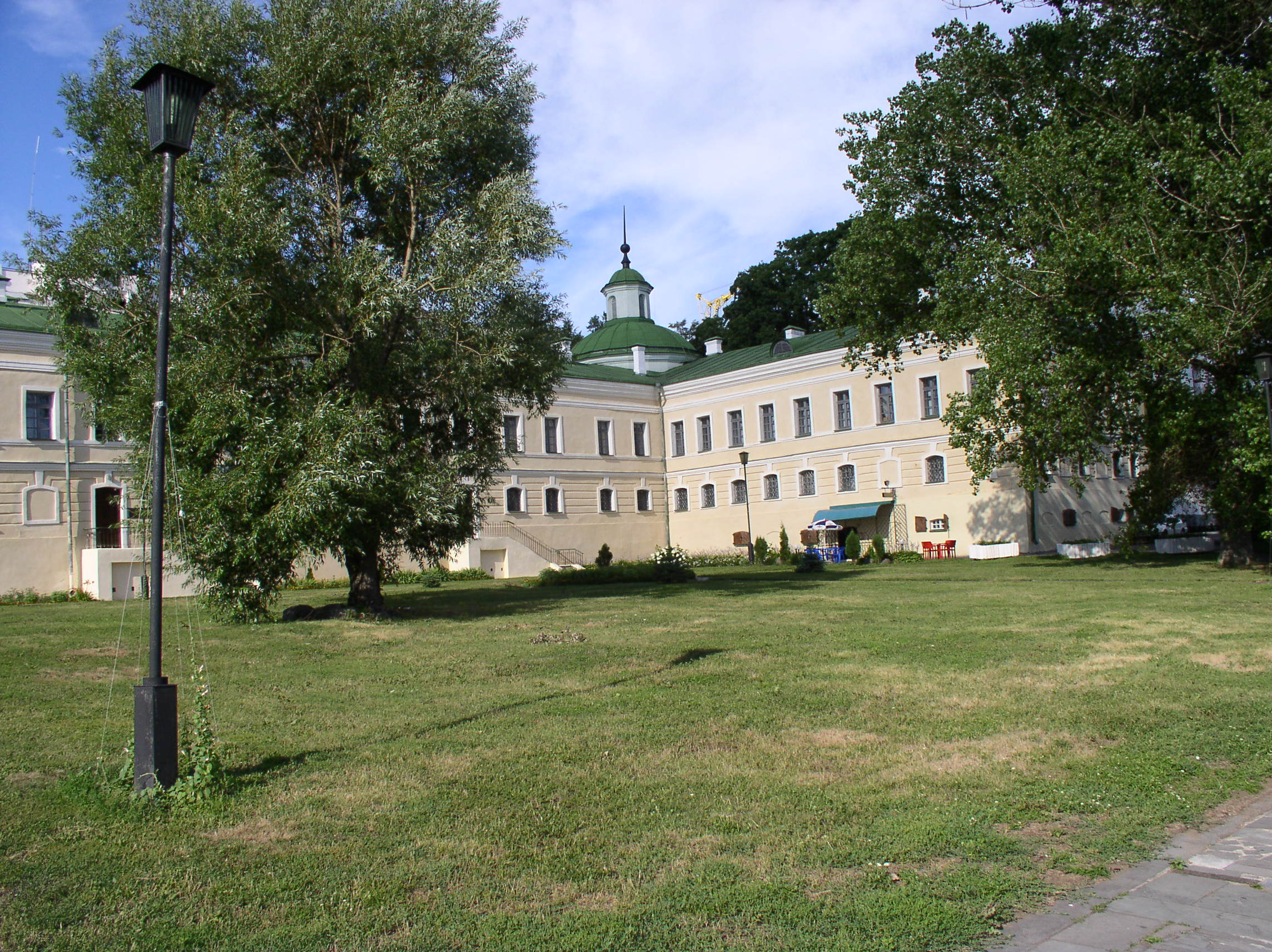
Bogoyavlensky Convent

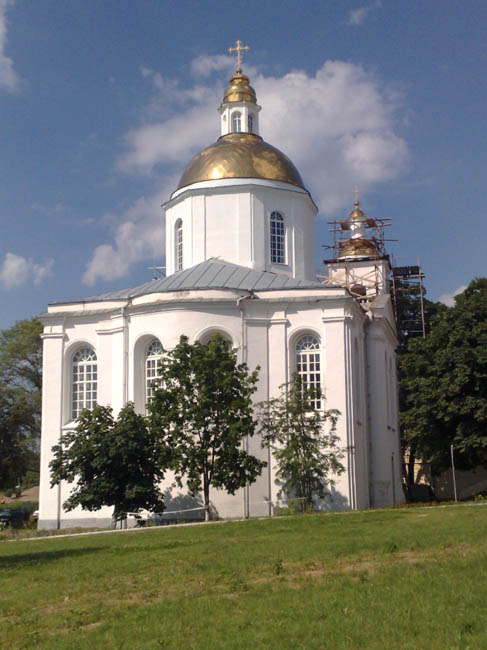
Bogoyavlensky Cathedral

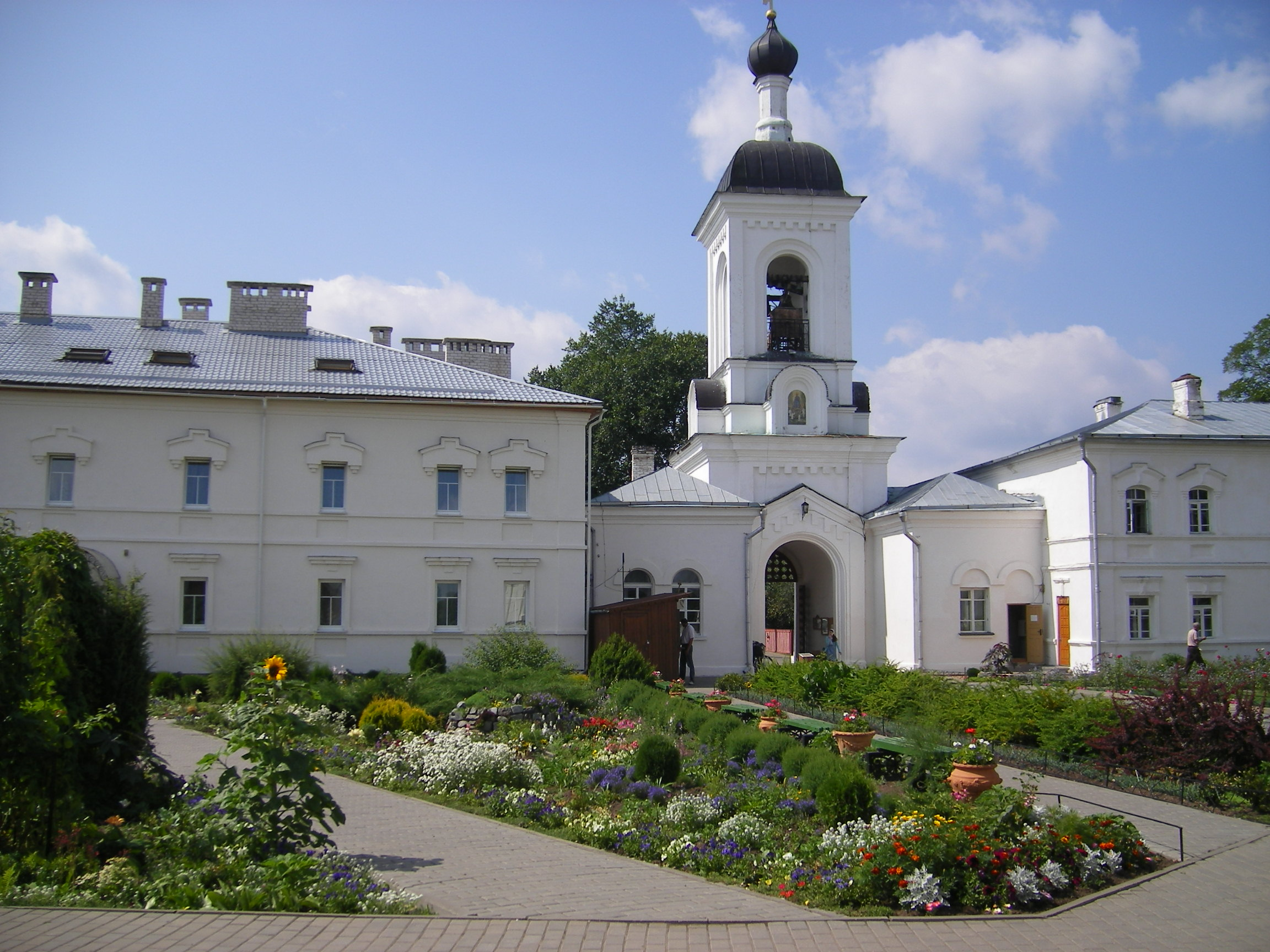
Convent of Saint Euphrosyne

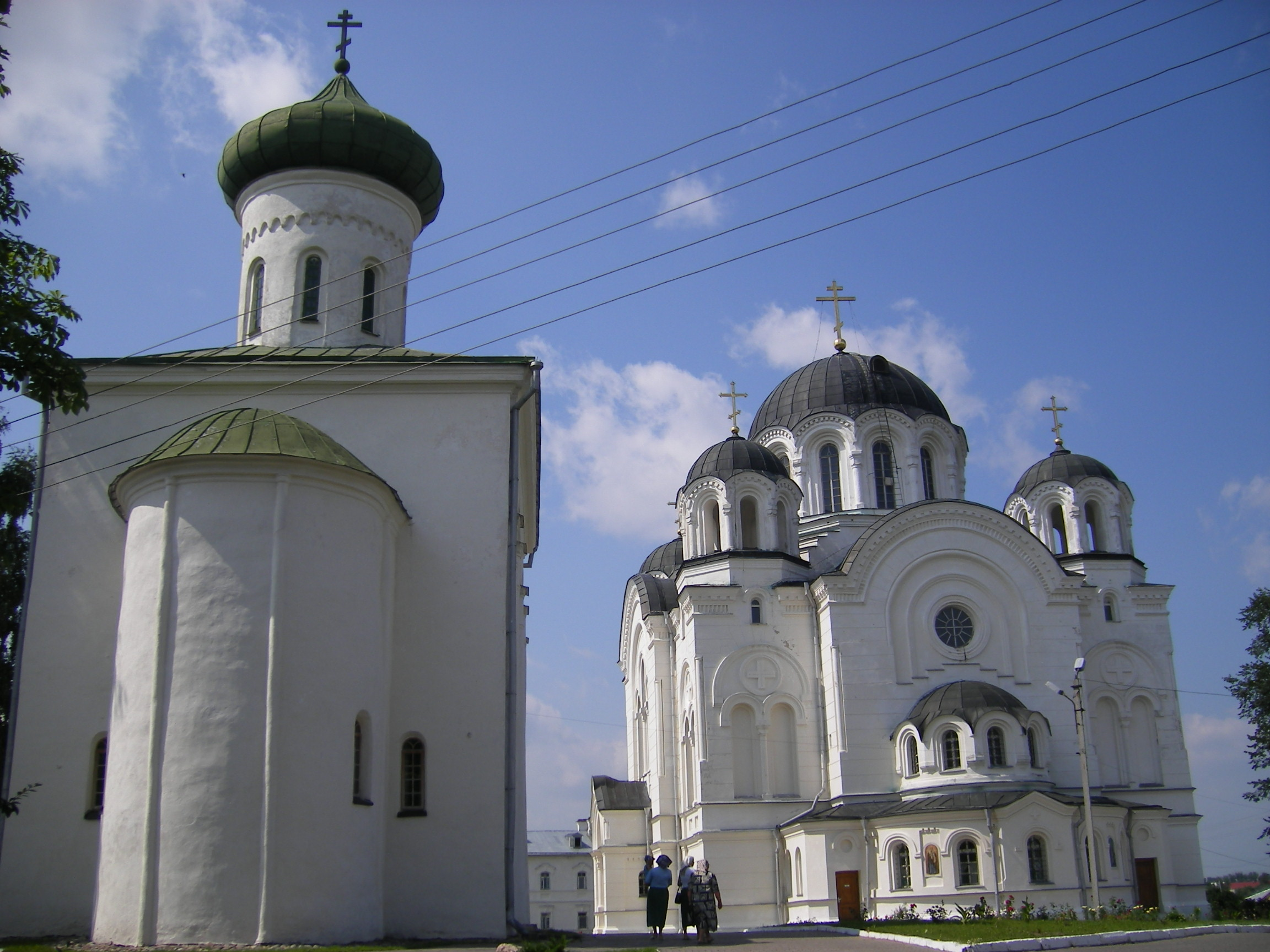
Convent of Saint Euphrosyne

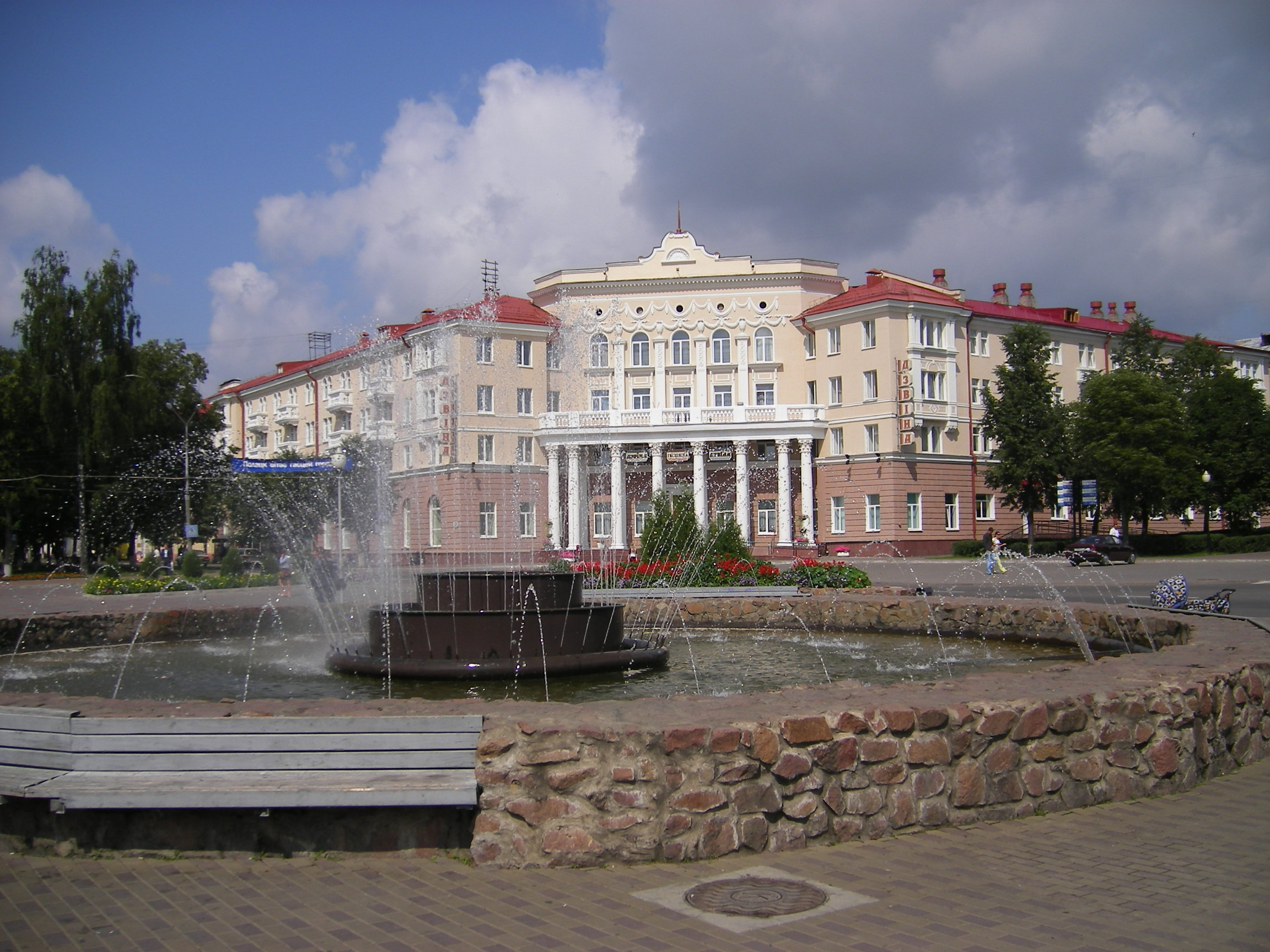
Polotsk main square with Hotel Dzvina

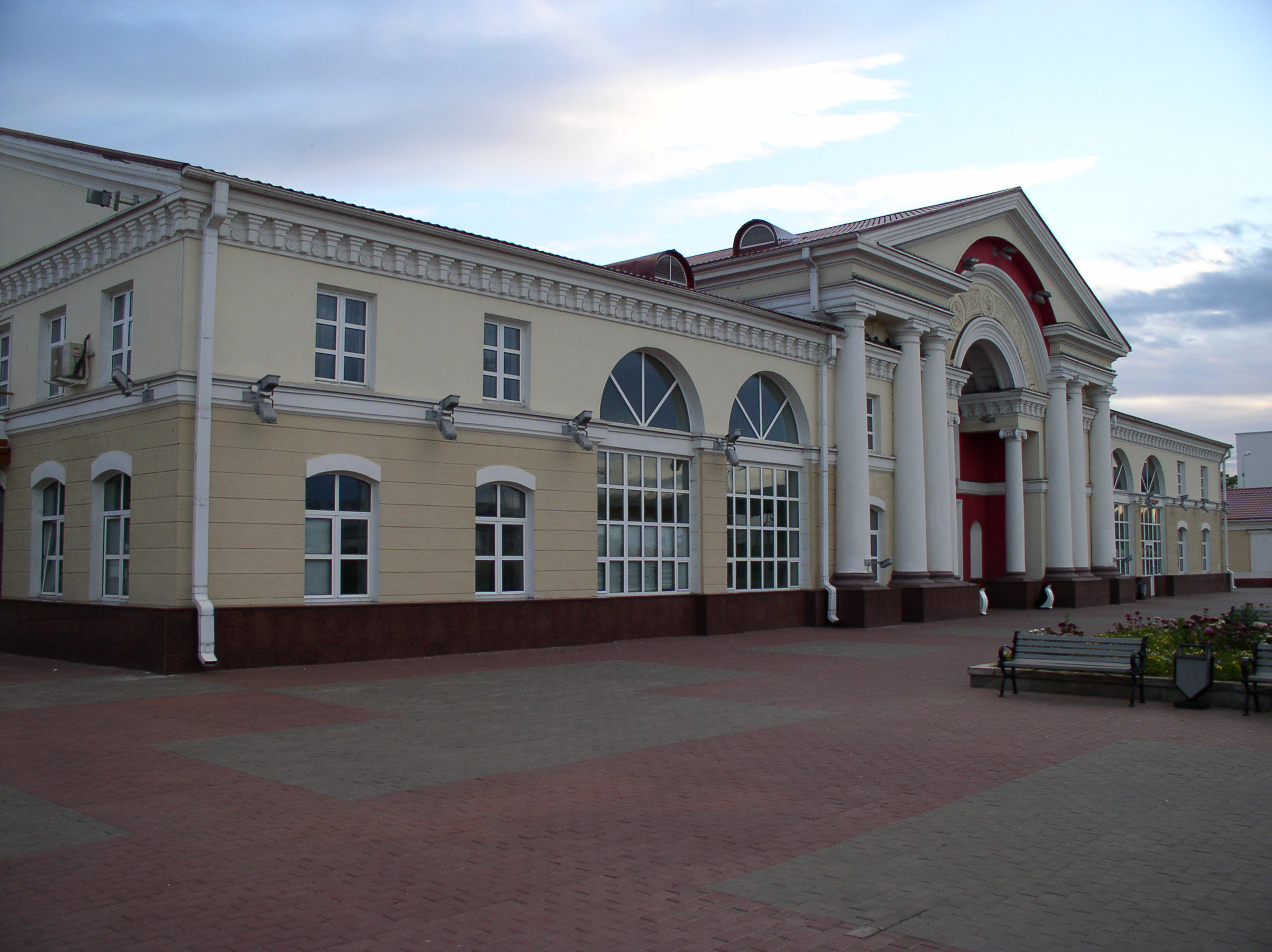
Railway station

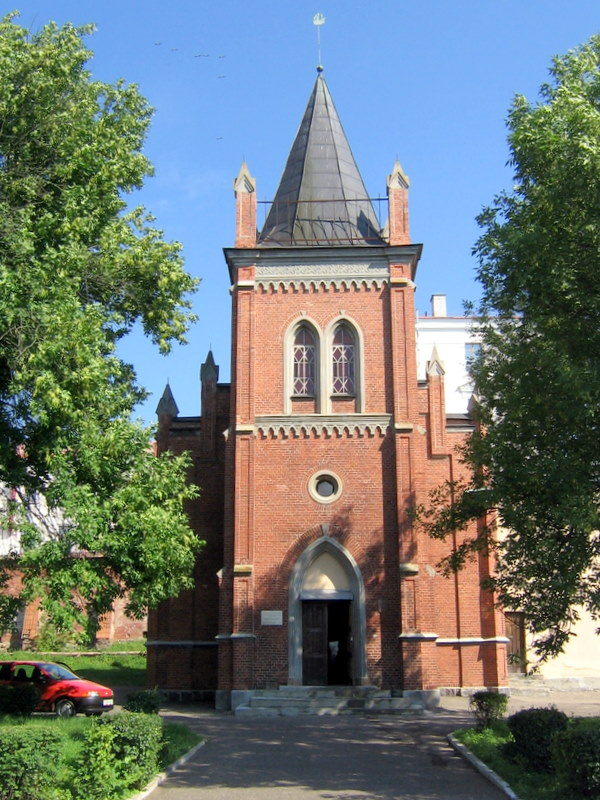
Former Lutheran church

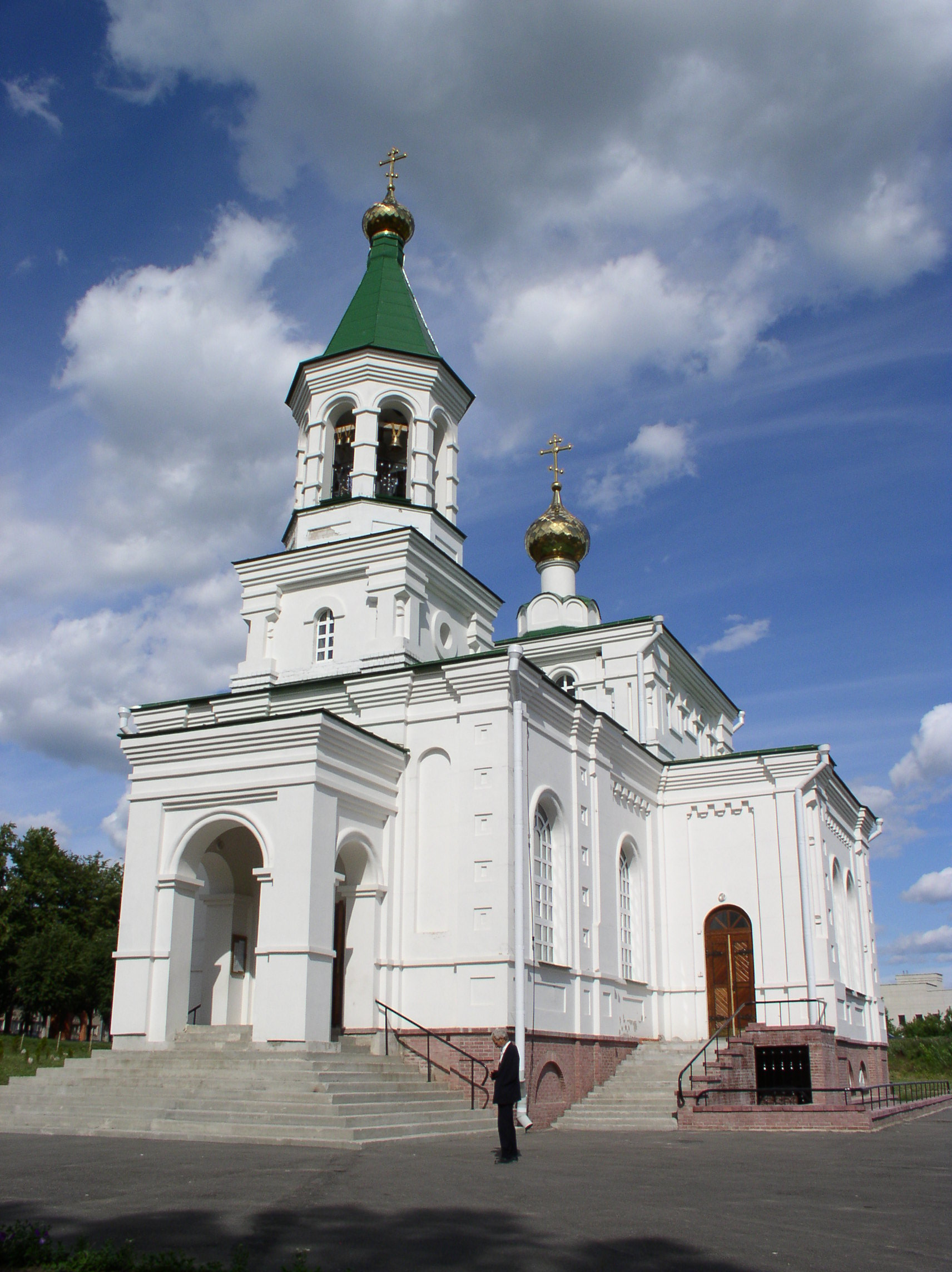
Church of Protection of Holy Virgin

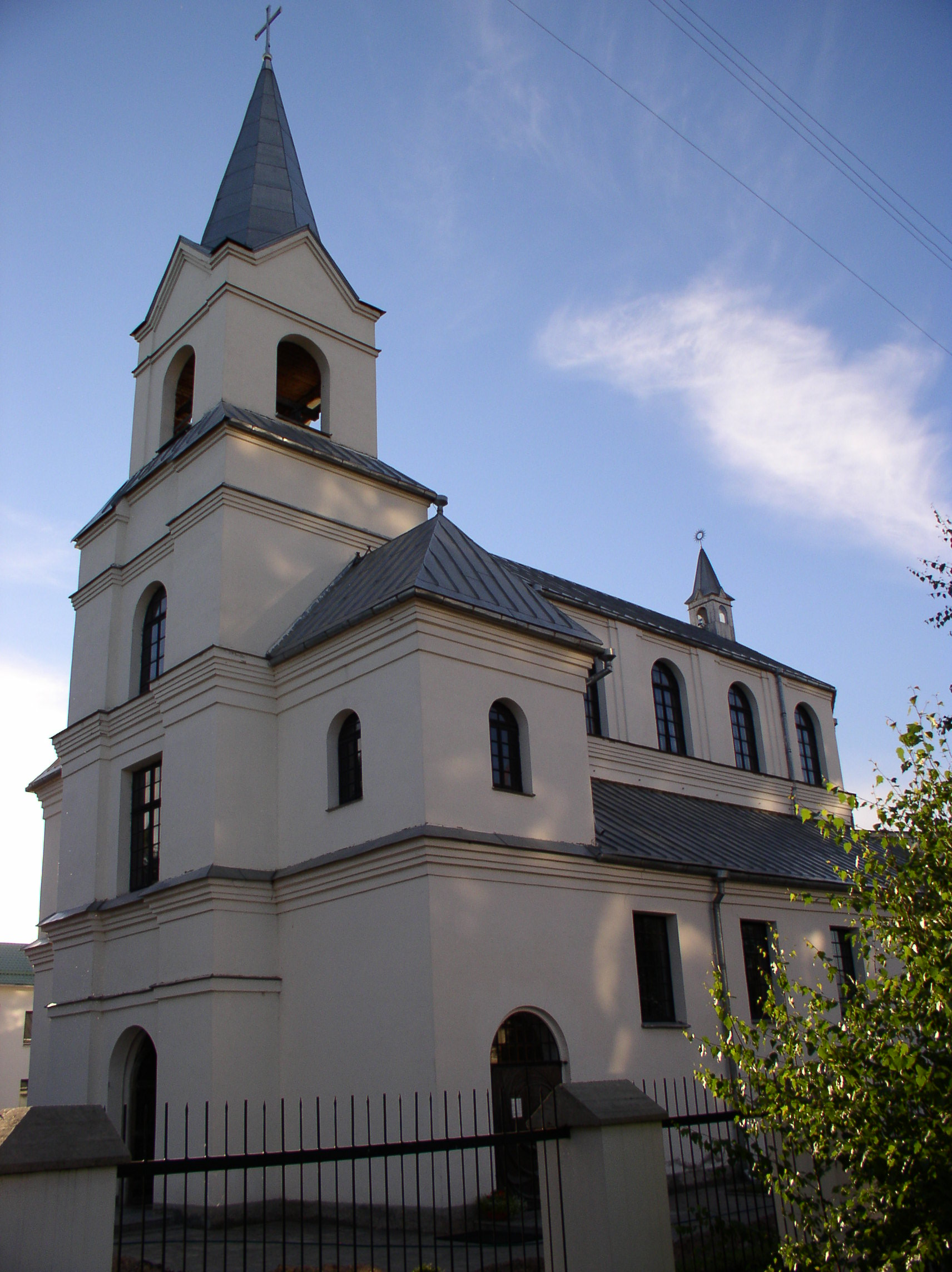
Church of Andrew Babola

== See also ==
- Krivichs
- Novopolotsk
