= Bryachislav of Polotsk =

Bryachislav
- Prince of Polotsk
- Reign: 1001–1044
- Predecessor: Iziaslav
- Successor: Vseslav
- Born: ~997; Polotsk
- Died: 1044; Polotsk
- Issue: Vseslav
Names
- Bryachislav Iziaslavovich
- House: Rurik
- Father: Iziaslav of Polotsk

Bryachislav Iziaslavich (Belarusian: Брачыслаў Ізяславіч, Russian: Брячислав Изяславич) (c. 997 – 1044) was the prince of Polotsk between 1001 and 1044. His name, possibly, may have been of something in approximation to Vratislav or Wroclaw. He was son of Iziaslav of Polotsk. During his reign Polotsk was at war with Kiev and Novgorod. In 1015 he inherited the city of Lutsk after the death of his grandfather Vladimir I of Kiev.

Bryachislav Iziaslavich was born in Polotsk. Either upon his father's death in 1001 or his minor brother Vseslav's in 1003, he inherited the Principality of Polotsk, himself being a child at this time (his grandparents married about 978). Under his rule, Polotsk attempted to distance itself from Kiev. Tensions were exacerbated by the fact that, under the East Slavic house law, since Iziaslav predeceased his father and never reigned in Kiev, his descendants from the House of Polotsk forfeited their dynastic rights to the Kievan throne being classified as izgoi (outcast). In 1020 Bryachislav managed to sack Novgorod, but on his way back he was confronted by an army of his uncle, Yaroslav the Wise. Bryachislav suffered a defeat during the battle on the Sudoma River and fled, leaving behind his Novgorodian prisoners and loot. Yaroslav chased him down and forced him to sign a peace agreement in 1021, granting him only two cities of Usvyat and Vitebsk. Despite this peace agreement, the hostilities between Bryachislav and Yaroslav continued for years. Eventually he extended the territory of his principality and established the city of Braslaw.

The name of his spouse or consort is unknown and he had at least one son, Vseslav of Polotsk, who was the ancestor of all the following Polotsk princes and the only one of them to rule in Kiev.

Bryachislav died in Polatsk in 1044.

== The Saga of Eymund ==
The Saga of Eymund (written in the 13th century) draws a different picture in the relationship between Polotsk and Kiev. It states that after the victory over Sviatopolk Yaroslav demanded from Bryachislav to yield some of his territories. The last one refused and drew his troops to the border of his realm. To wage a war Yaroslav sent Ingegerd who was taken hostage by Bryachislav and acted as a mediator in the negotiations between Yaroslav and Bryachislav. The conditions of the mentioned negotiations were following: Bryachislav accepts Kiev, Yaroslav was left with Novgorod while being recognized as the konung of Garðaríki, while Eymund the mercenary was awarded Polotsk. After a short while Bryachislav died and Yaroslav attained all of his territories. Numerous historians (O.Senkovsky and M.Sverdlov) reason the fact of Bryachislav gaining the rights on Kiev and Eymund on Polotsk by both being appointed by the konung of Garðaríki.

Bryachislav of Polotsk Rurikovich Born: 997 Died: 1044
Regnal titles
Preceded by Iziaslav Vladimirovich	Prince of Polotsk; 1001–1044	Succeeded by Vseslav Bryachislavich
